= Solaris Center =

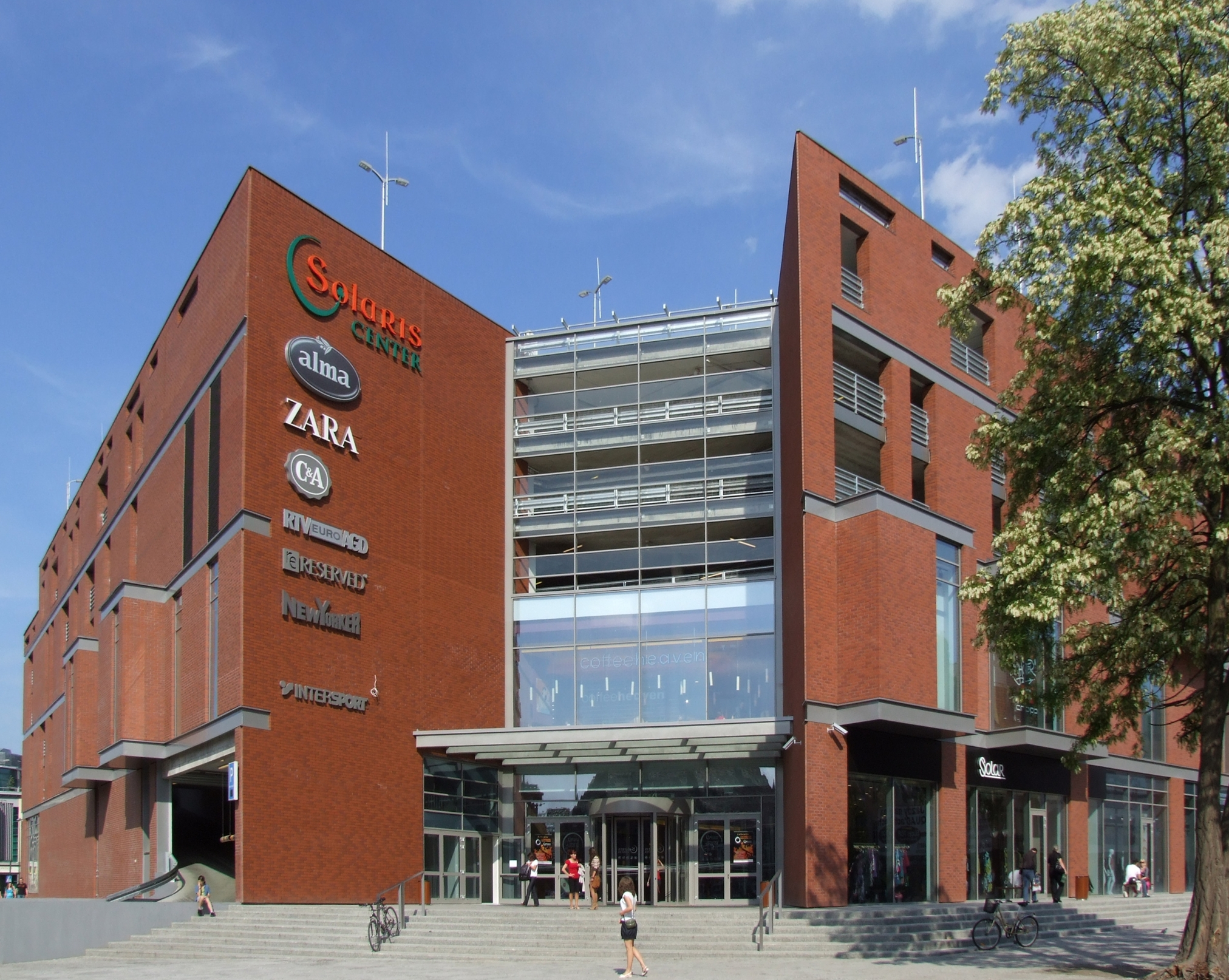
- Solaris Center main entrance

- Location within Poland

General information
- Location: Opole
- Coordinates: 50°40′13″N 17°55′34″E
- Groundbreaking: 2007
- Opening: March 4, 2009

Design and construction
- Architect: J.S.K.

Solaris Center is a commercial and entertainment complex in Opole, Poland, located on the Copernicus Square (pl. Plac Kopernika), next to the University of Opole. The Center was opened in 2009 and underwent expansion 10 years later. It belongs to the NEPI Rockcastle group.

== See also ==
- List of shopping malls in Poland
