= Opole =

City in Poland

Opole Ôpole (Silesian)
- City county
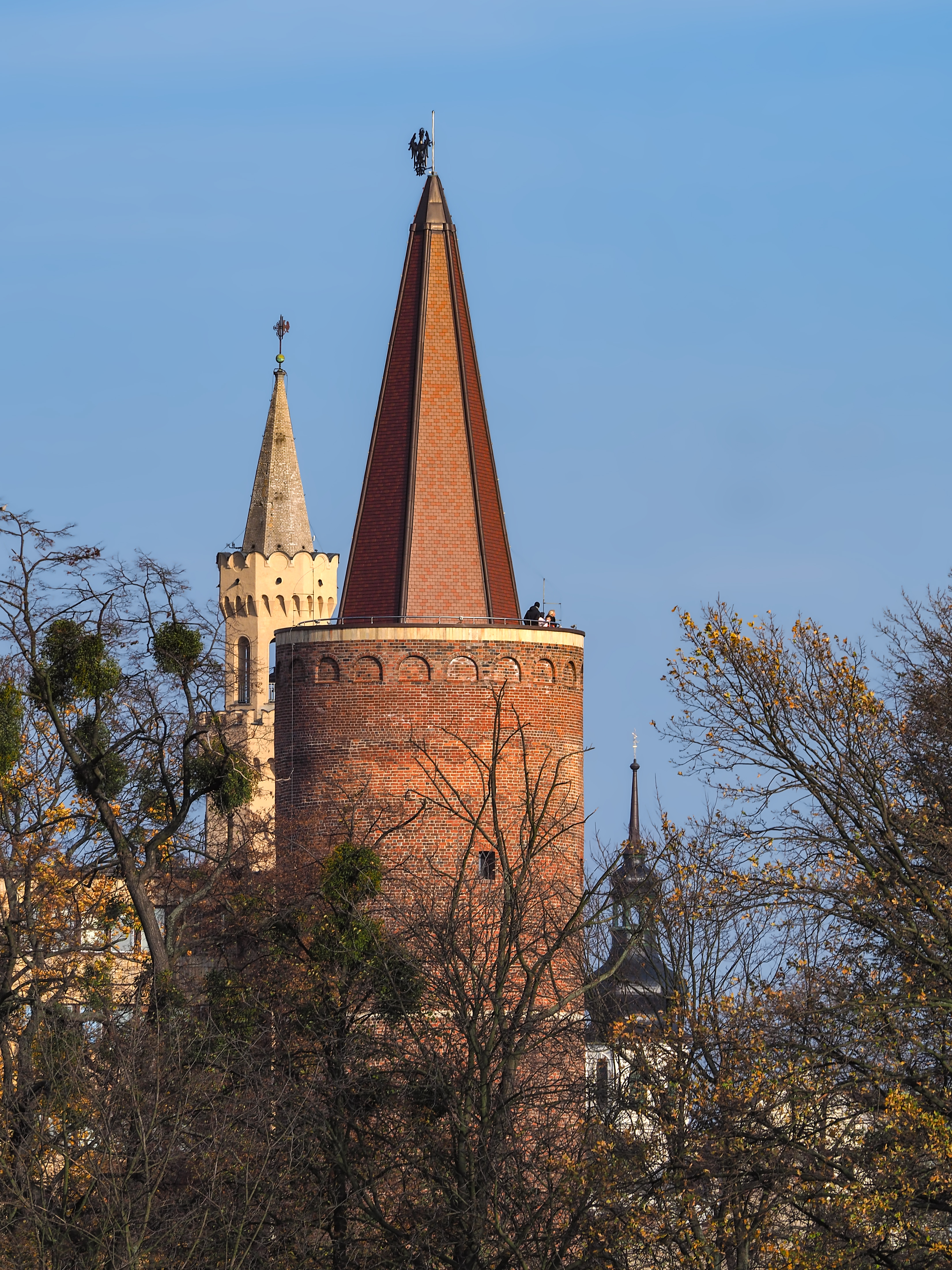
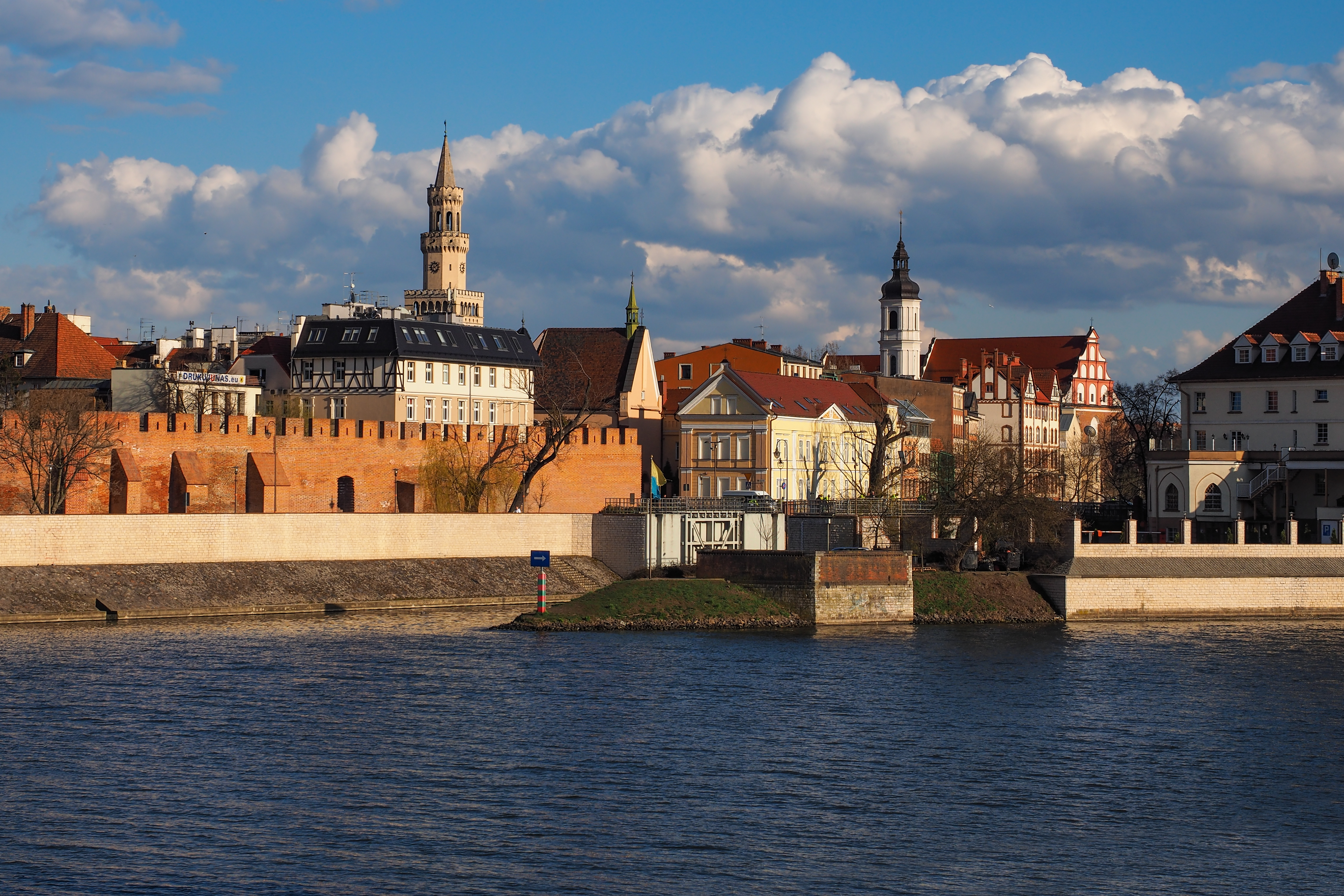
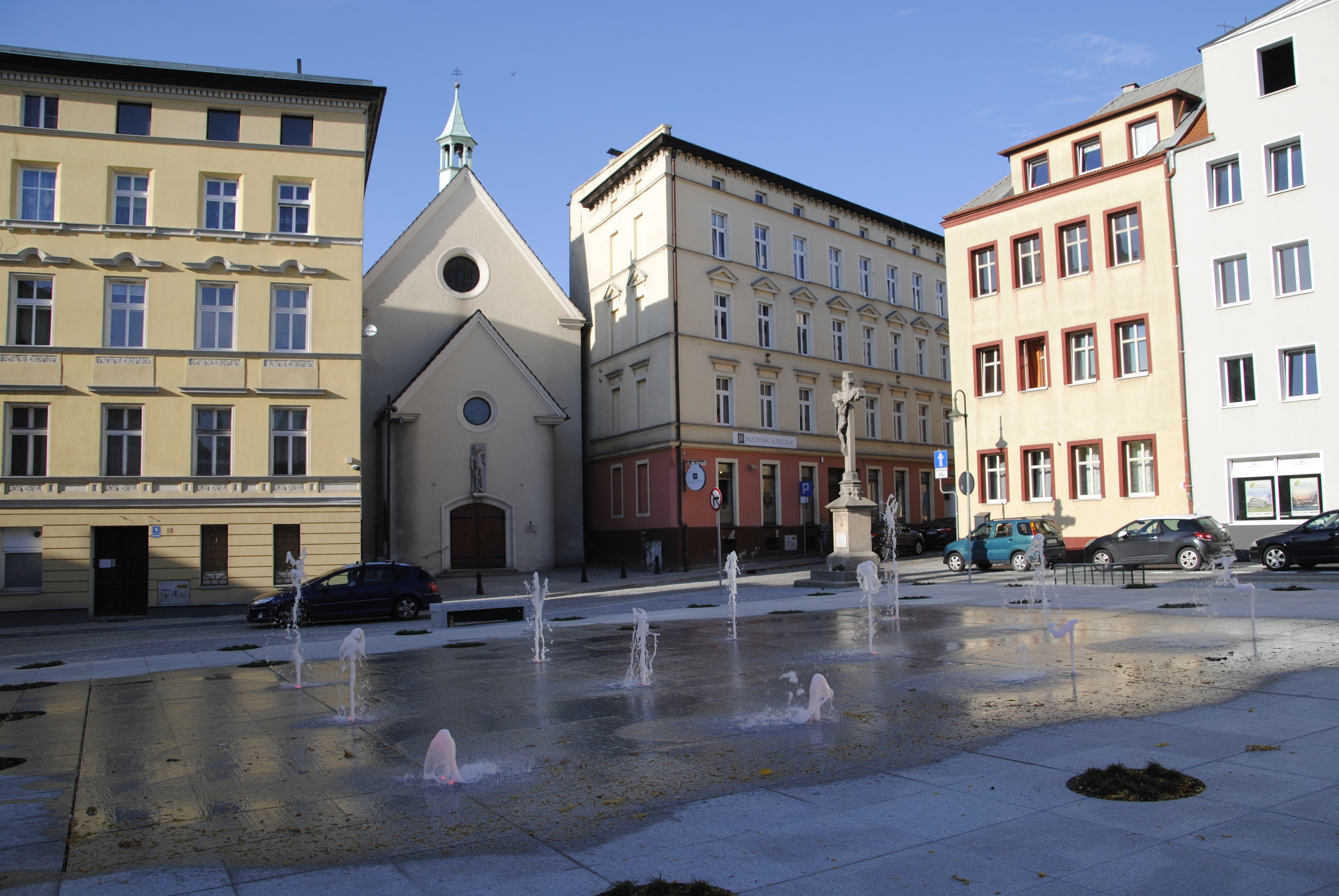
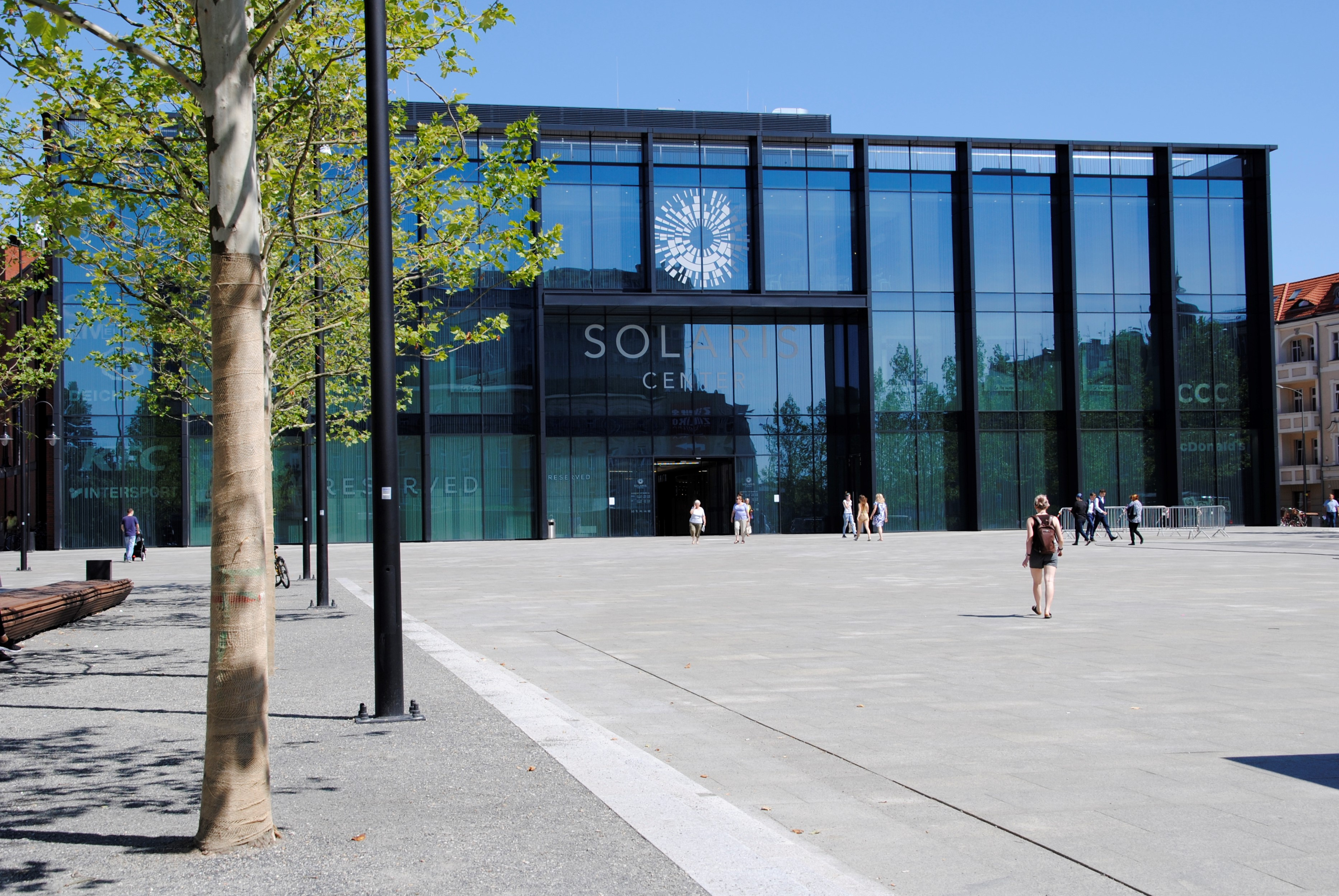
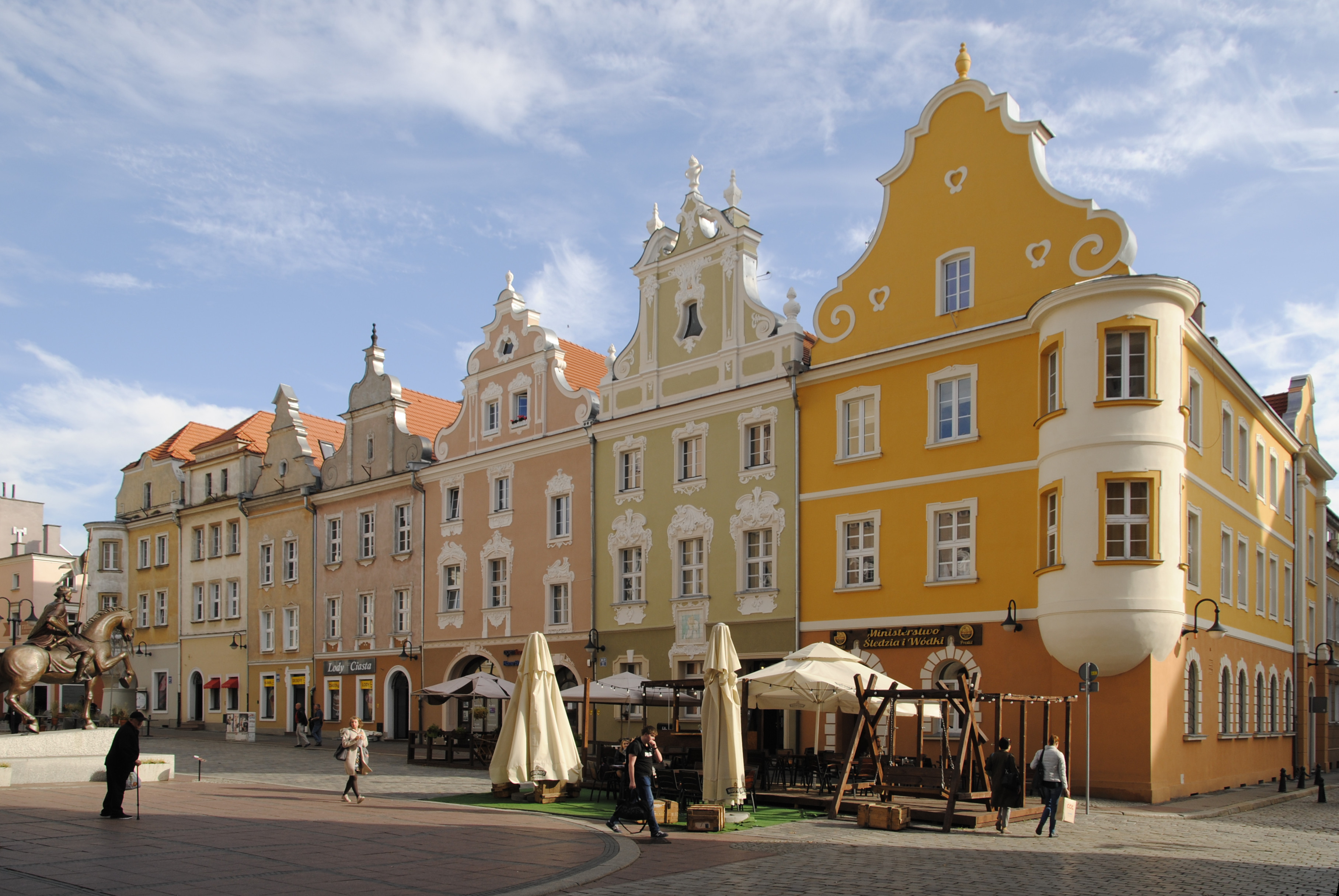
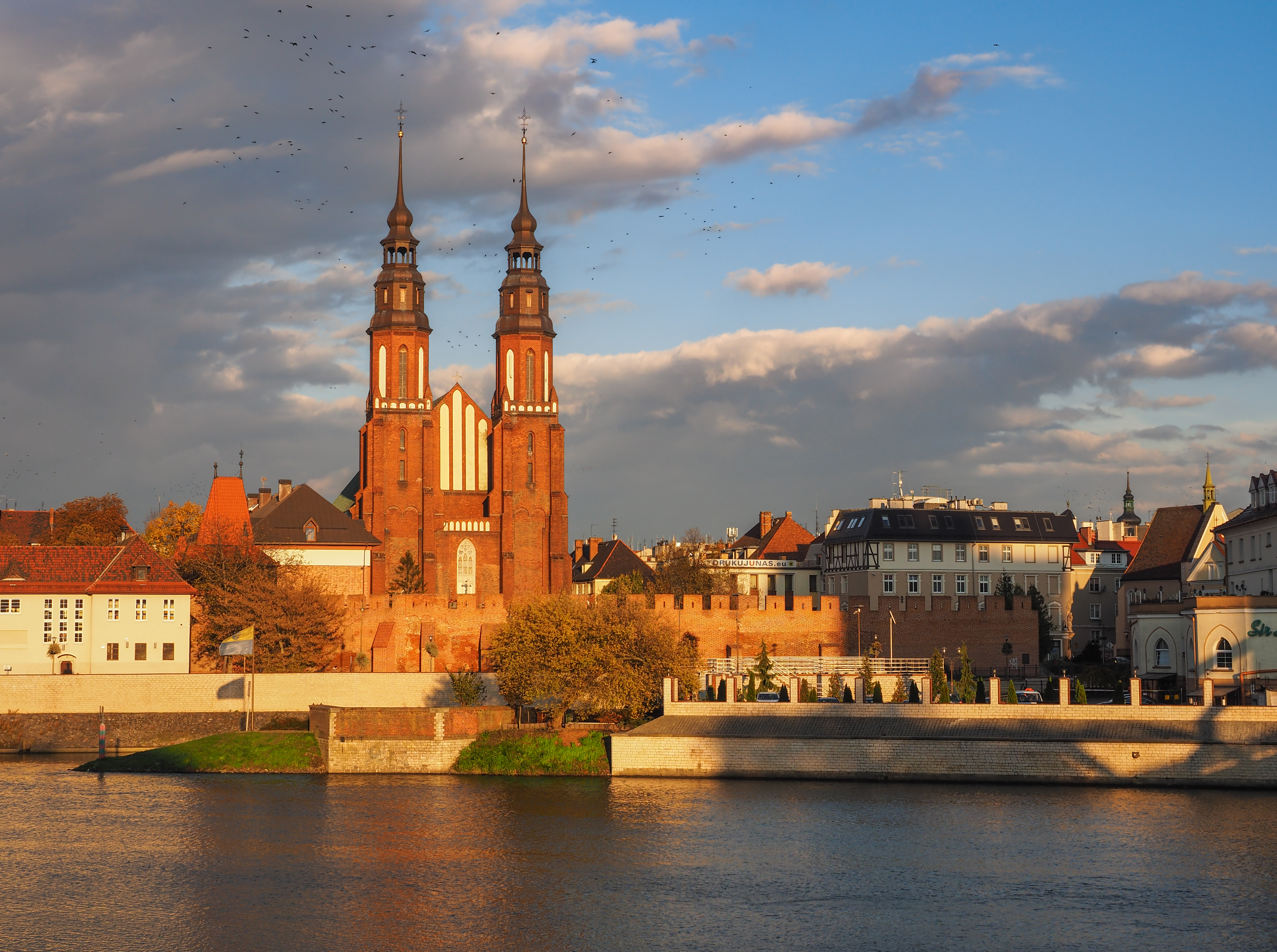
- Piast Tower Old Town, Town Hall (left) St. Sebastian Square Solaris Center Market Square Cathedral

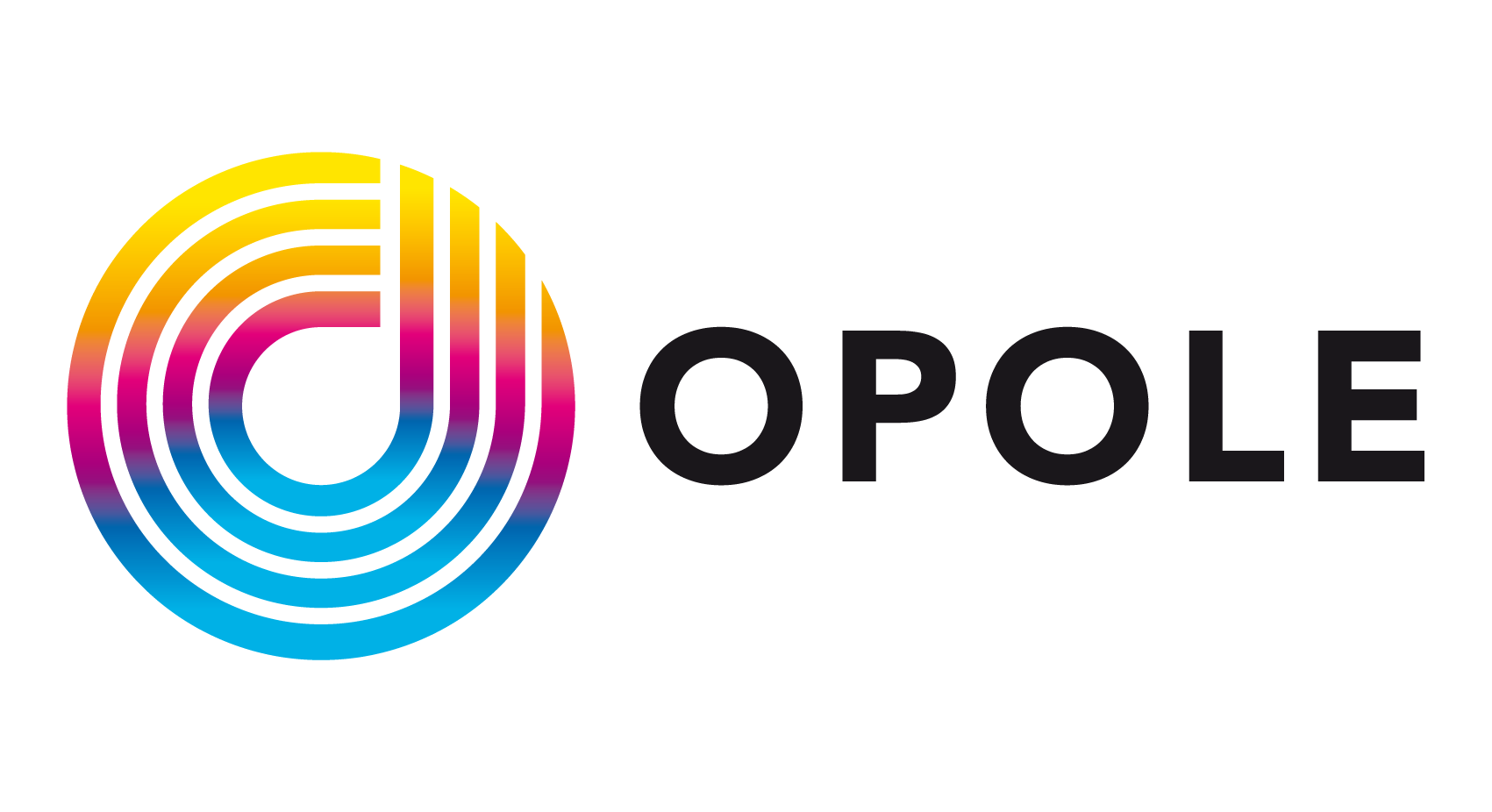
- Flag Coat of arms Brandmark
- Nicknames: Venice of Poland
- Location within Poland
- Coordinates: 50°40′0″N 17°55′27″E
- Country: Poland
- Voivodeship: Opole
- County: city county
- Established: 8th century
- Town rights: By 1217

Government
  - Body: Opole City Council
  - Mayor: Arkadiusz Wiśniewski (NP)

Area
  - City county: 148.9 km^{2} (57.5 sq mi)
  - Metro: 338.4 km^{2} (130.7 sq mi)
- Elevation: 176 m (577 ft)

Population (31 March 2021 census)
  - City county: 127,387
  - Density: 856/km^{2} (2,220/sq mi)
  - Metro: 146,522
  - Metro density: 433/km^{2} (1,120/sq mi)
- Time zone: UTC+1 (CET)
  - Summer (DST): UTC+2 (CEST)
- Postal code: 45-001 to 45-960
- Area code: +48 077
- Car plates: OP
- Website: https://www.opole.pl

Opole (Polish: [ɔˈpɔlɛ]; German: Oppeln [ˈɔpl̩n]; Silesian: Ôpole; (Note: Silesian PLS alphabet: Ôpole, Steuer's Silesian alphabet: Uopole.) Silesian German: Uppeln) (Note: Czech: Opolí; Latin: Oppelia, Oppolia or Opulia.) is a city located in southern Poland on the Oder River and the historical capital of Upper Silesia. With a population of approximately 127,387 as of the 2021 census, it is the capital of Opole Voivodeship (province) and the seat of Opole County. Its metropolitan area was home to 146,522 inhabitants. It is the largest city in its province.

Opole's history dates to the 8th century. One of the oldest urban centres in Upper Silesia, it originated as an early medieval Slavic stronghold of the Opolans tribe and later became the seat of the Piast Duchy of Opole. The present-day city developed in the early 13th century, when Duke Casimir I of Opole established a chartered town on the opposite bank of the Oder. Over the following centuries, it formed part of the Bohemian Crown, the Habsburg monarchy, Prussia, and the German Reich. After World War II, the city was incorporated into Poland. Many German Upper Silesians and Poles of ethnic German ancestry still reside in the Opole region; but, following the 1945–46 expulsions, ethnic Germans now make up less than 3% of the city's population.

There are four higher education establishments in the city: the Opole University, Opole University of Technology, a Medical College and the private Higher College of Management and Administration. The National Festival of Polish Song has been held here annually since 1963. Each year new regular events, fairs, shows and competitions take place.

Opole is sometimes referred to as "The Venice of Poland", because of its picturesque Old Town and several canals and bridges connecting parts of the city.

== Names and etymology ==
The name Opole likely originated from the medieval Slavic term for a group of settlements.

Names for the city in other relevant languages include Lower Silesian: Uppeln, Czech: Opolí, Latin: Oppelia, Oppolia or Opulia.

== History ==
=== In Medieval Poland ===
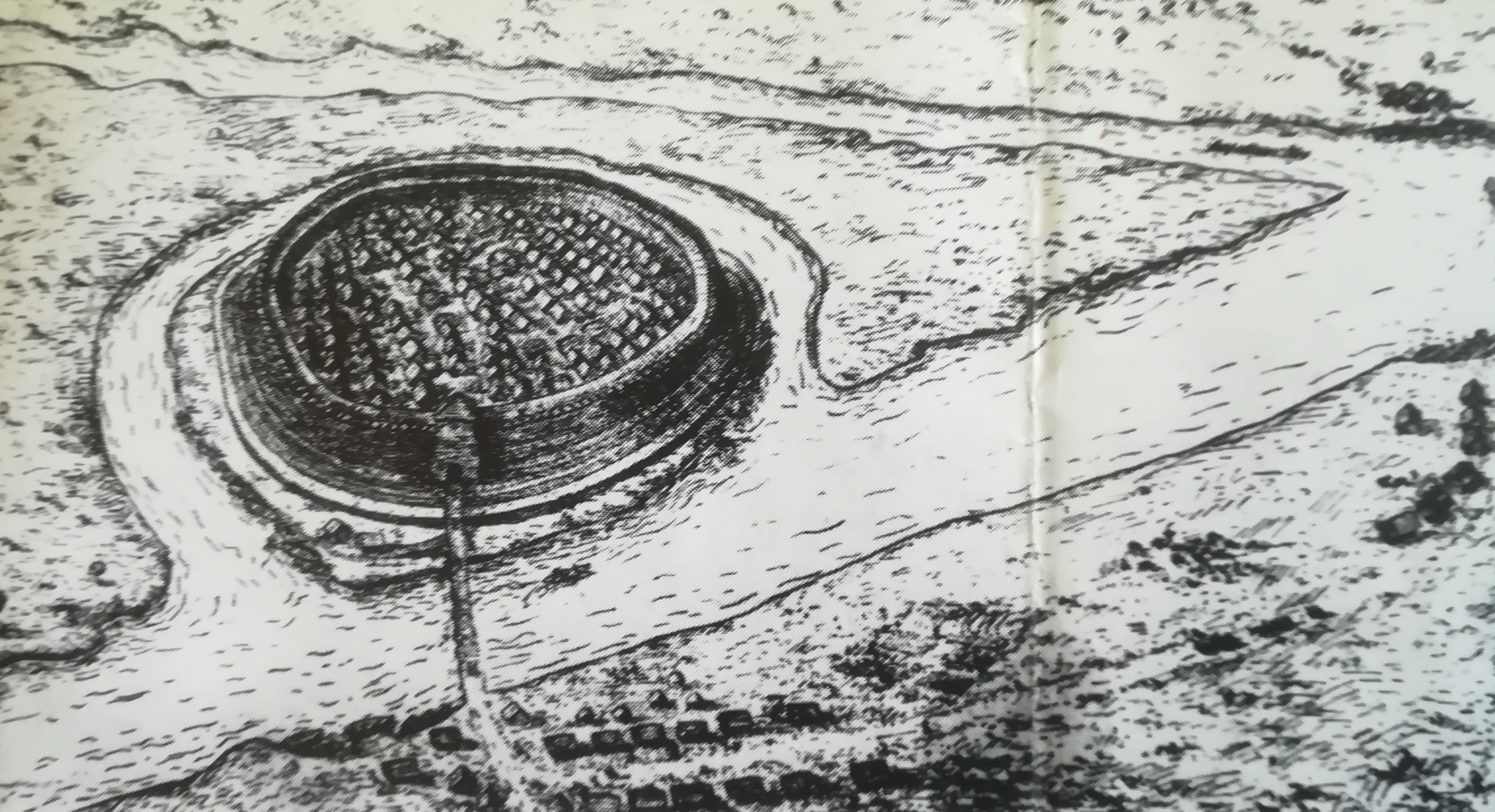
Contemporary model of the early medieval Polish stronghold in Opole

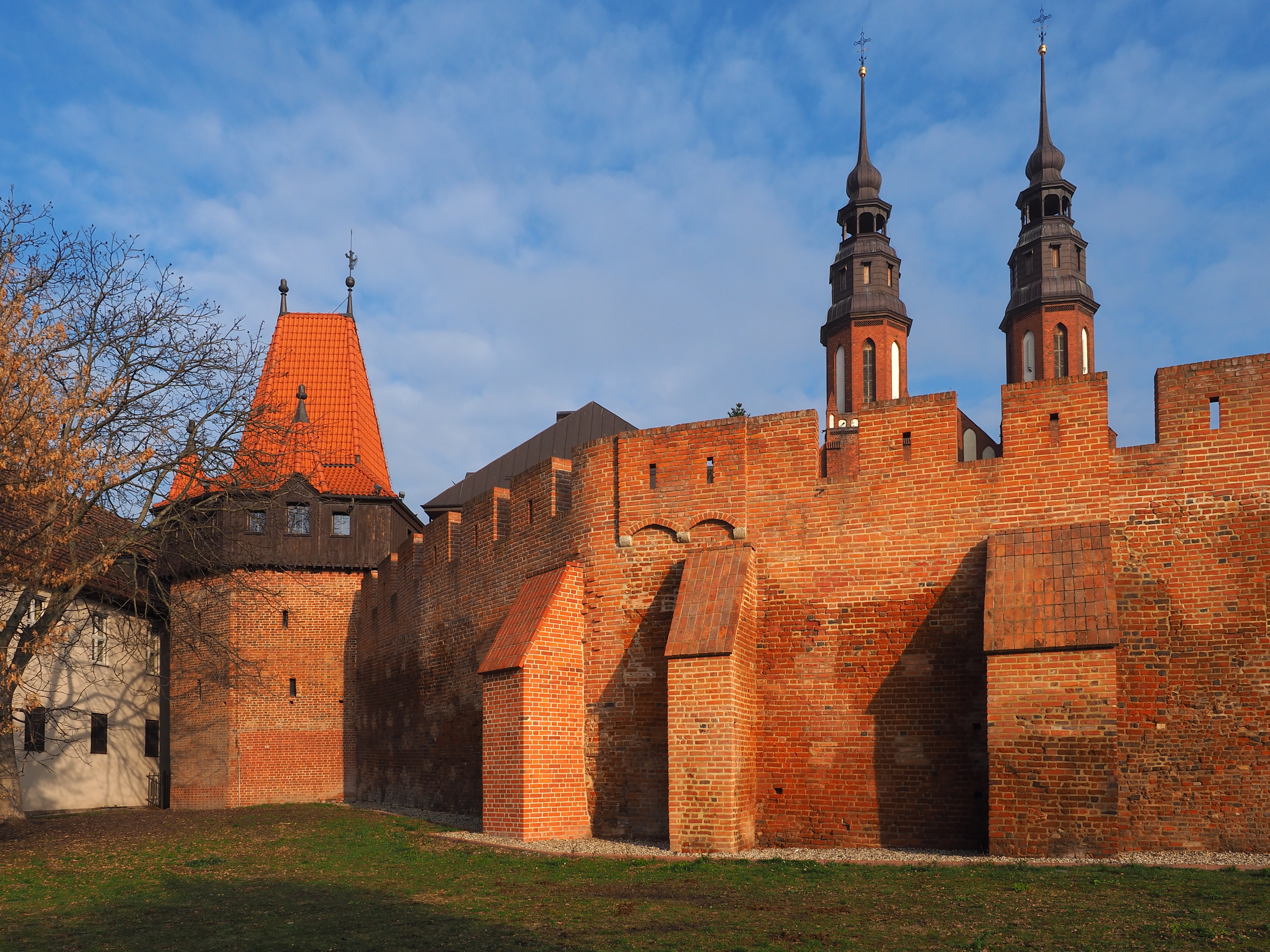
A fragment of medieval defensive walls that once surrounded Opole

Opole's history begins in the 8th century. At this time, according to the archaeological excavations, the first settlement was founded on the Ostrówek – the northern part of the Pasieka Island in the middle of the Oder river. In the early 10th century it developed into one of the main "gords" of the Lechitic (Polish) Opolans tribe.

At the end of the century Silesia became part of Poland and was ruled by the Piast dynasty; the land of the pagan Opolanie was conquered by Duke Mieszko I in 992. From the 11th–12th centuries it was also a castellany. After the death of Duke Władysław II the Exile, Silesia was divided in 1163 between two Piast lines – the Wrocław line in Lower Silesia and the Opole-Racibórz of Upper Silesia. Opole would become a duchy in 1172 and would share much in common with the Duchy of Racibórz, with which it was often combined. In 1281 Upper Silesia was divided further between the heirs of the dukes. The Duchy of Opole was temporarily reestablished in 1290.

In the early 13th century, Duke Casimir I of Opole decided to move the settlement from the Pasieka Island to the right shore of the Oder river (since the 17th century, the old stream bed of the Oder, known as the Młynówka). All of the inhabitants had to be moved in order to accommodate the castle that was built in place of the old city. The new town was established under German law between 1211 and 1217. It was settled by inhabitants of the earlier settlement on Ostrówek as well as German merchants that immigrated from the West. In 1327, Duke Bolko II of Opole granted the town the right to use the municipal law of Neumarkt (Środa Śląska). Opole developed during the rule of duke Bolko I of Opole. The castle was finally completed around this time and new buildings, including the city walls and the Holy Cross Church, were constructed.

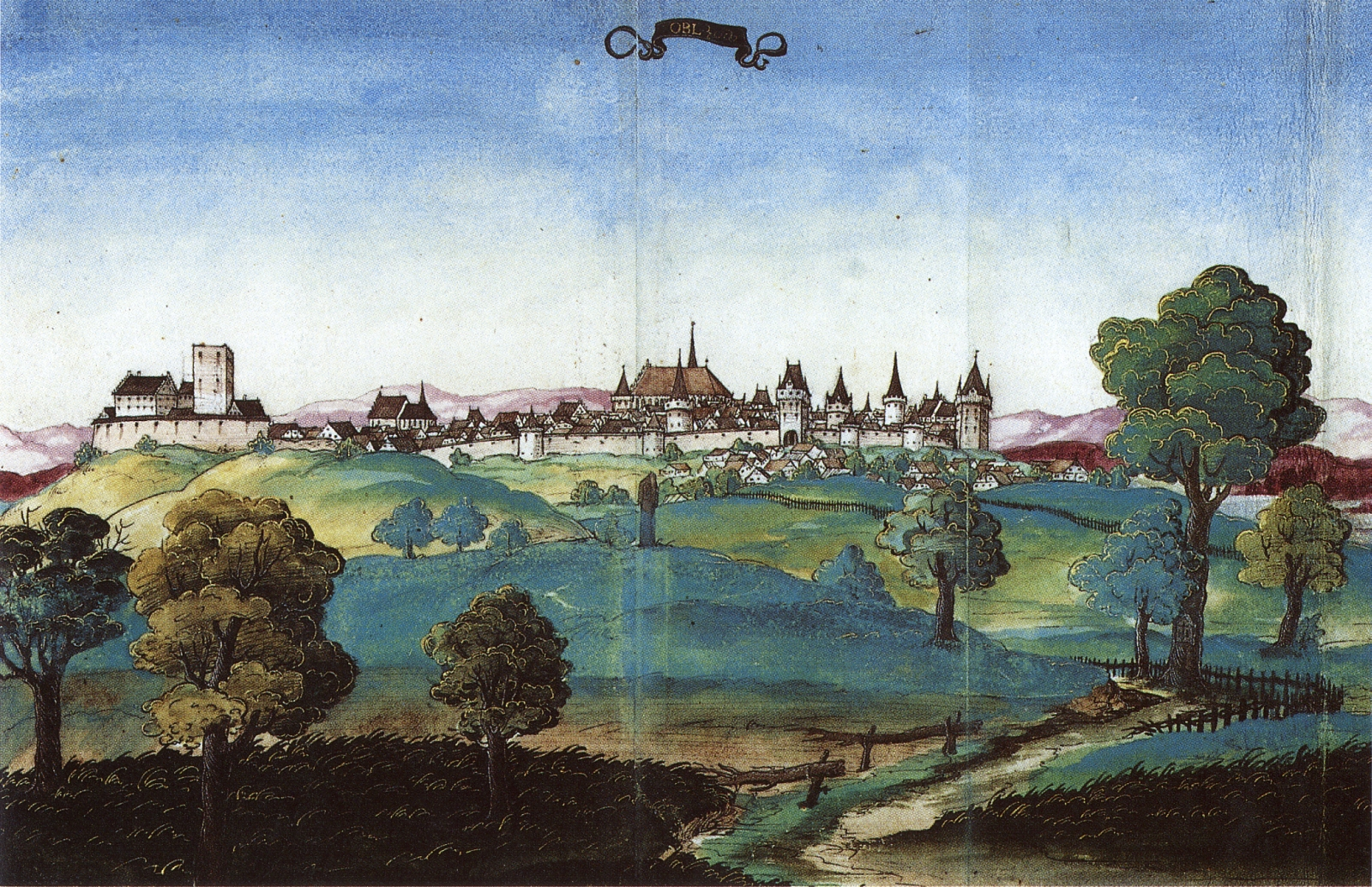
The oldest known view of Opole seen from southeast, circa 1535

Along with most of Silesia, in 1327 the Duchy of Opole came under the sovereignty of the Kingdom of Bohemia, itself part of the Holy Roman Empire. In 1521 the Duchy of Opole inherited the Duchy of Racibórz (Ratibor), by then also known by its German equivalent – Oppeln. The second castle of Opole was probably founded in the 14th century by duke Vladislaus II, though some sources claim that it was originally a wooden stronghold of Opole's castellan dating into 12th century.

=== Austrian Habsburgs and Polish Vasas rule ===
With the death of King Ludvík II of Bohemia at the Battle of Mohács, Silesia was inherited by Ferdinand I, placing Opole under the sovereignty of the Habsburg monarchy of Austria. The Habsburgs took control of the region in 1532 after the last Piast duke of Opole, Jan II the Good, died. At that time the city was still mainly Polish-speaking (around 63%), with other nationalities represented mainly by Germans, Czechs and Jews. The last two dukes of Opole, Nicholas II and Janusz II the Good, did not master the German language.

Beginning in 1532 the Habsburgs pawned the duchy to different rulers including several monarchs of Poland (see Dukes of Opole). After the Swedish invasion of Poland, in 1655 the King of Poland, John II Casimir Vasa, stayed with his entire court in Opole. In Opole in November 1655, the Universal of Opole (Uniwersał opolski) was issued by the King, calling for Poles to rise against the Swedes, who at that time occupied a large part of Poland.

With the abdication of King John II Casimir of Poland as the last Duke of Opole in 1668, the region passed to the direct control of the Habsburgs. At the beginning of the 18th century, the German population of Opole was estimated at 20%.

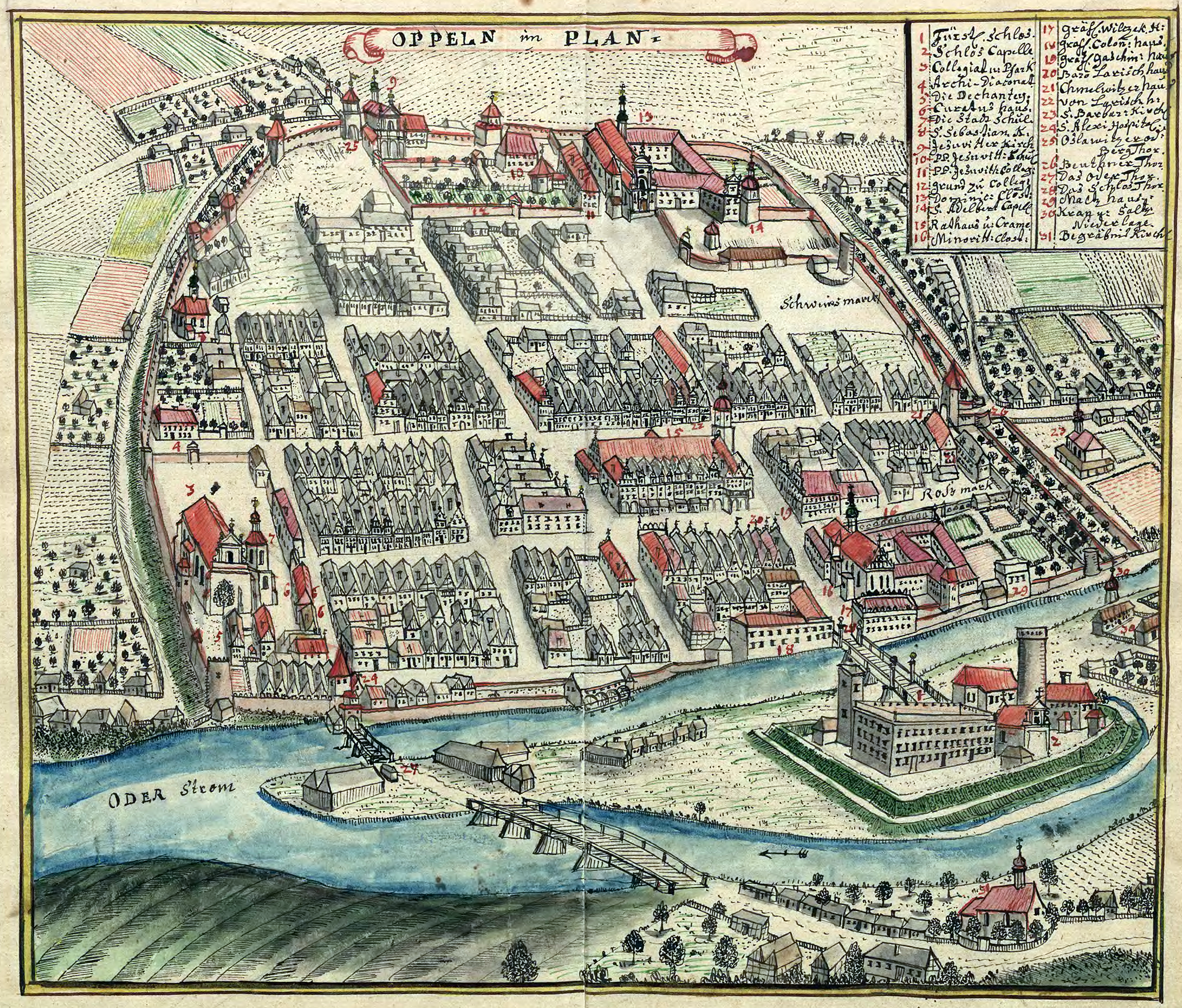
18th-century view of Opole

=== In Prussian Silesia ===
King Frederick II of Prussia conquered most of Silesia from Austria in 1740 during the Silesian Wars; Prussian control was confirmed in the Peace of Breslau in 1742. In the 18th century, Opole belonged to the tax inspection region of Prudnik. The city's rapid development was facilitated by the establishment of a Regency (Regierungsbezirk) seat in Oppeln in 1816. The first railway connection between Oppeln, Brieg and Breslau was opened in 1843 and the first manufacturing plants were constructed in 1859, which greatly contributed to the city's regional significance.

Under Prussian rule the ethnic structure of the city began to change. In the early 20th century the number of Polish and bilingual citizens of Opole, according to the official German statistics, varied between 25% and 31%. Nonetheless, Opole remained an important cultural, social and political center for the Poles of Upper Silesia. From 1849 the Polish newspaper Gazeta Wiejska dla Górnego Śląska was published in Opole. Polish reporter and opponent of Germanisation Bronisław Koraszewski founded the newspaper Gazeta Opolska in 1890 and the People's Bank in Opole (Opolski Bank Ludowy) in 1897. Another Polish newspaper, the Nowiny was founded by Franciszek Kurpierz in 1911.

From 1816–1945 Opole was the capital of Regierungsbezirk Oppeln within Prussia. The city became part of the German Empire during the unification of Germany in 1871.

=== After World War I ===
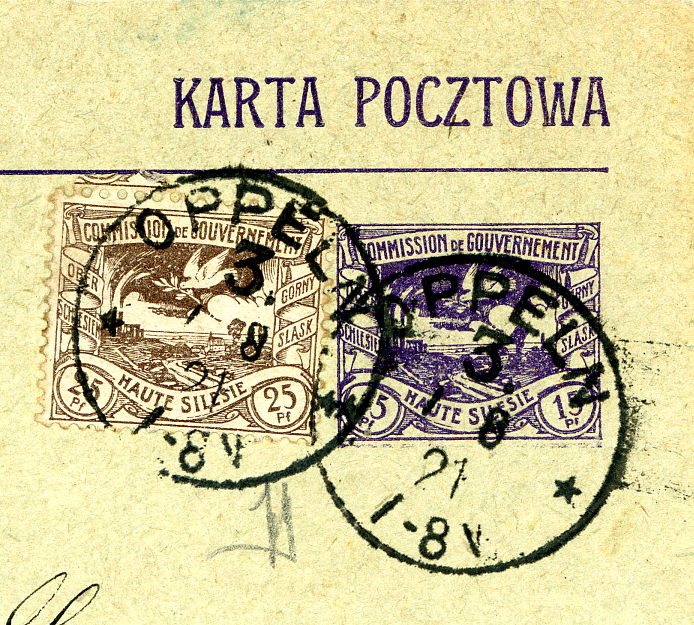
Stamps after the plebiscite in August 1921 featured the German name of Oppeln

After the defeat of Imperial Germany in World War I, a plebiscite was held on 20 March 1921 in Oppeln to determine if the city would be in the Weimar Republic or become part of the Second Polish Republic, which had just regained independence. 20,816 (94.7%) votes were cast for Germany, 1,098 (5.0%) for Poland, and 70 (0.3%) votes were declared invalid. Voter participation was 95.9%. In the present-day neighbourhoods (then separate localities) of Grudzice, Krzanowice, Malina, Winów and Wrzoski the majority voted for Poland with results ranging from 54.8% in Krzanowice to 74.9% in Wrzoski, whereas in the present-day neighbourhoods of Bierkowice, Brzezie, Chmielowice, Czarnowąsy, Gosławice, Półwieś, Sławice, Szczepanowice, Wójtowa Wieś, Wróblin and Żerkowice the majority voted for Germany with result ranging from 50.3% in Gosławice and Sławice to 94.2% in Brzezie. The local newspaper Oppelner Nachrichten was published in Oppeln.

Oppeln was the administrative seat of the Province of Upper Silesia from 1919–1939. In the years 1928–1931, by the decision of the German regional administration, the Piast Castle was demolished. Thanks to the strong opposition of the local Polish community and protests of the Union of Poles in Germany, the castle tower was saved from demolition. Nowadays called the Piast Tower it is one of the city's landmarks. In 1929, a Polish theatre from Katowice came to Opole to perform the opera Halka by Stanisław Moniuszko. After the performance, the actors were brutally beaten by a German militia with the silent consent of the German police.

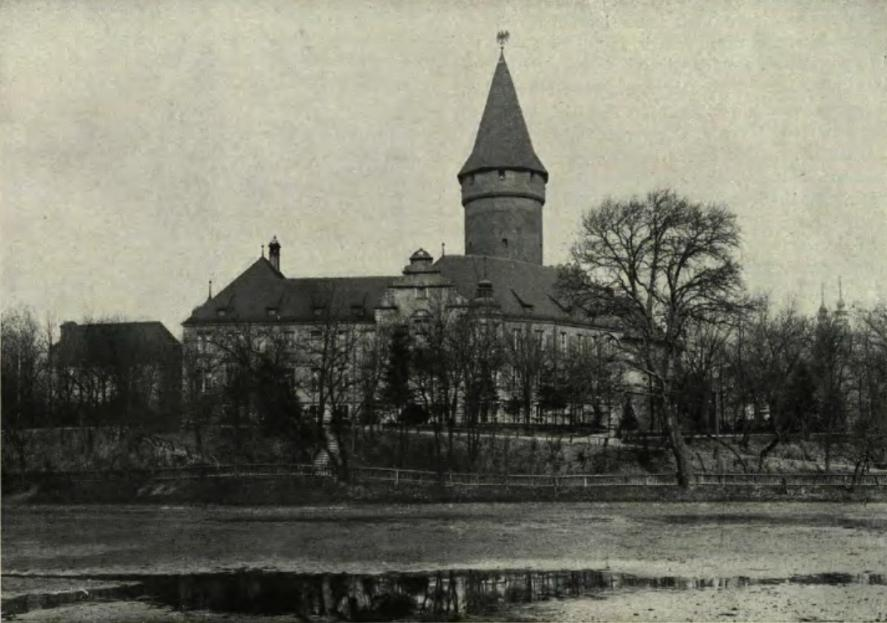
The Piast Castle, prior to its demolition by the German authorities

Local Polish activists were intensively persecuted from 1937 onwards. The local Gestapo terrorized and spied on Polish activities in the German-held part of Upper Silesia, participated in espionage and sabotage in the Polish part of Silesia and prepared border provocations against Poland. There was strong anti-Polish propaganda in the city and region.

The local Polish newspaper Nowiny Codzienne was frequently confiscated from 1937 and its editors were harassed, its work obstructed, its distributors persecuted, and its readers threatened. In 1938–1939, the local Gestapo carried out expulsions of Polish activists from the region, which the local Polish press could still report. On 2 July 1939 a Nazi militia attacked and severely beat Poles going to a Polish service in the Saint Sebastian Church.

=== World War II ===
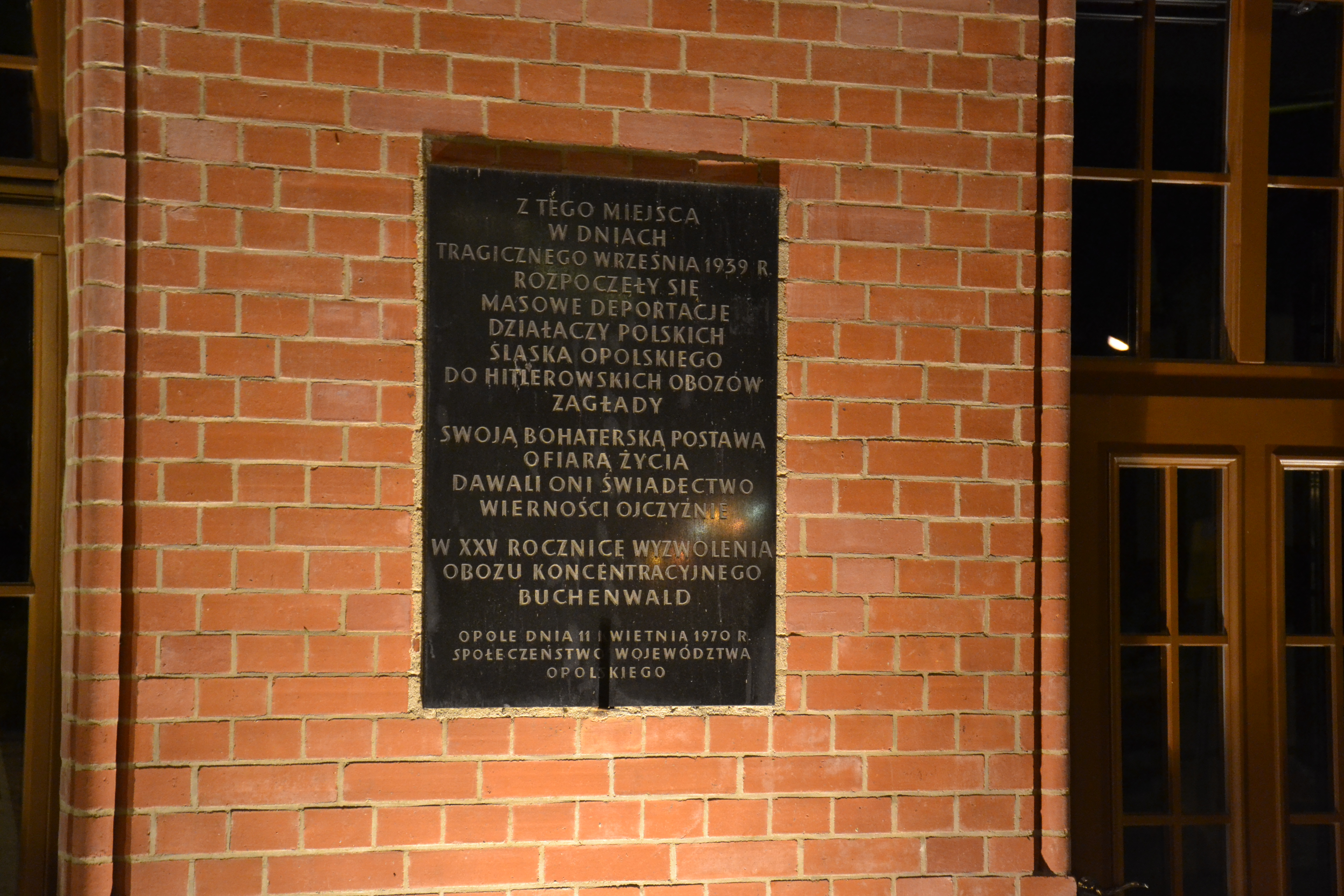
Plaque at the main railway station commemorating deportations of Poles from Opole to concentration camps in 1939

On 31 August, the day before the German invasion of Poland that began World War II, the Germans began mass arrests of prominent Poles in the city, which were continued in September. Among the arrested Poles were activists, entrepreneurs, journalists, editors, scout leaders, the director of the local Polish bank and the director of the local Polish library. The Nowiny Codzienne newspaper was closed down on 1 September, and its editorial team, including editor-in-chief Jan Łangowski, was deported to concentration camps. In September 1939, local Polish organizations were closed down by the German police and Gestapo, and the assets of the local Polish bank were confiscated. On 13 September and 4 October 1939, arrested Poles were deported from the city to concentration camps, men to Buchenwald and women to Ravensbrück. Some local Poles avoided arrest by escaping earlier to Poland.

The German 10th Army and 14th Army attacked Poland from the city, and the Einsatzgruppe I and II followed the armies from Opole to various Polish cities to commit crimes against the Polish people. After the defeat of Poland, Polish Eastern Upper Silesia was re-annexed to the Province of Upper Silesia and Oppeln lost its status as provincial capital to German-occupied Katowice (renamed Kattowitz).

Polish prisoners from the city co-founded the secret resistance movement in Buchenwald, while Polish escapees from the city participated in the Polish resistance in occupied Poland. Local members of the Polish resistance were expelled from the city.

During the war, the Nazis operated thirteen forced labour subcamps of the Stalag VIII-B/344 prisoner-of-war camp for Allied POWs in the city, and two in the present-day district of Groszowice.

The New Synagogue was built in 1893–1897, designed by Felix Henry. During the Kristallnacht on 9–10 November 1938 Nazis forced Rabbi Hans Hirschberg to set the building on fire.

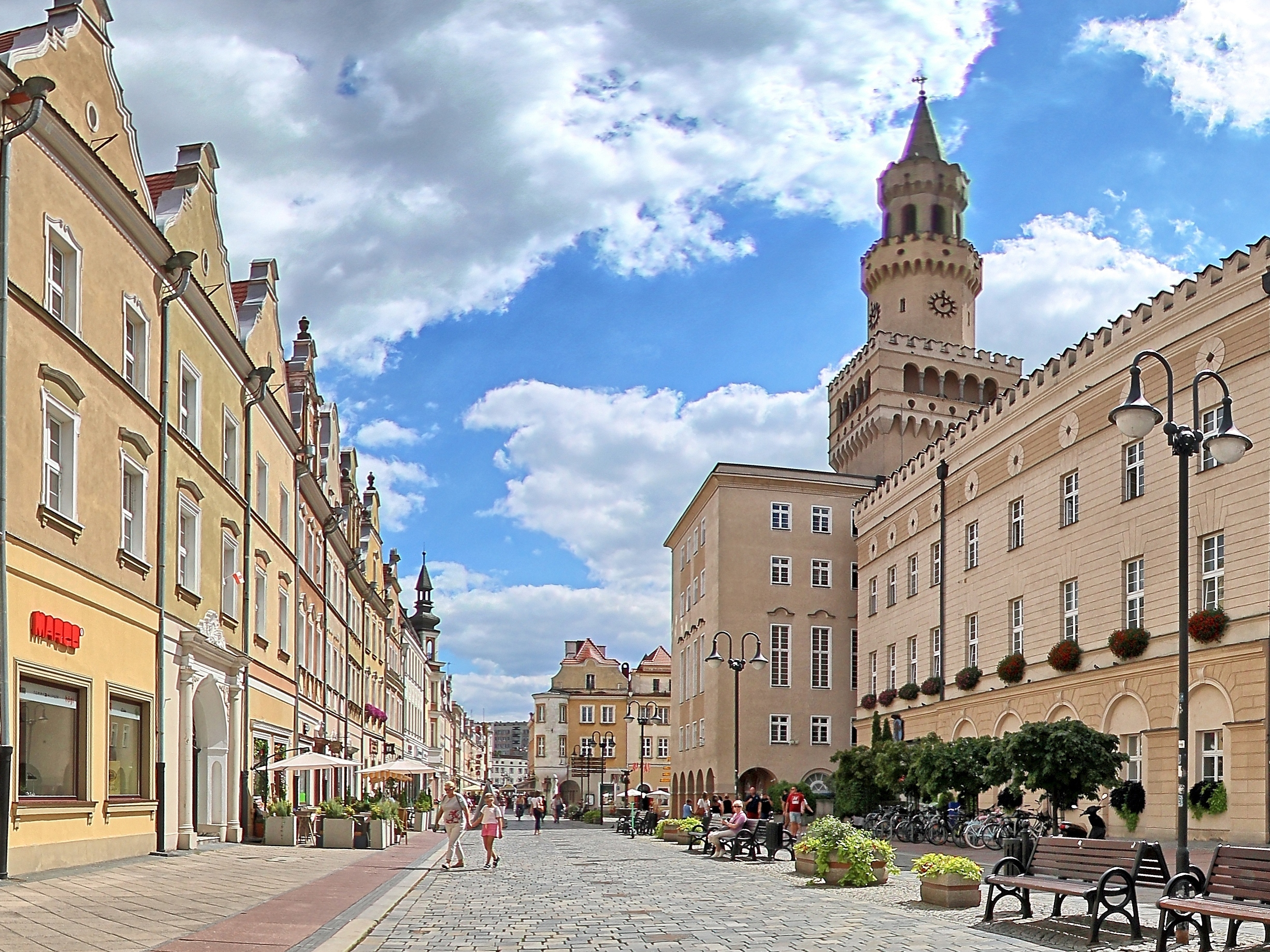
Architecture of the Main Marketplace

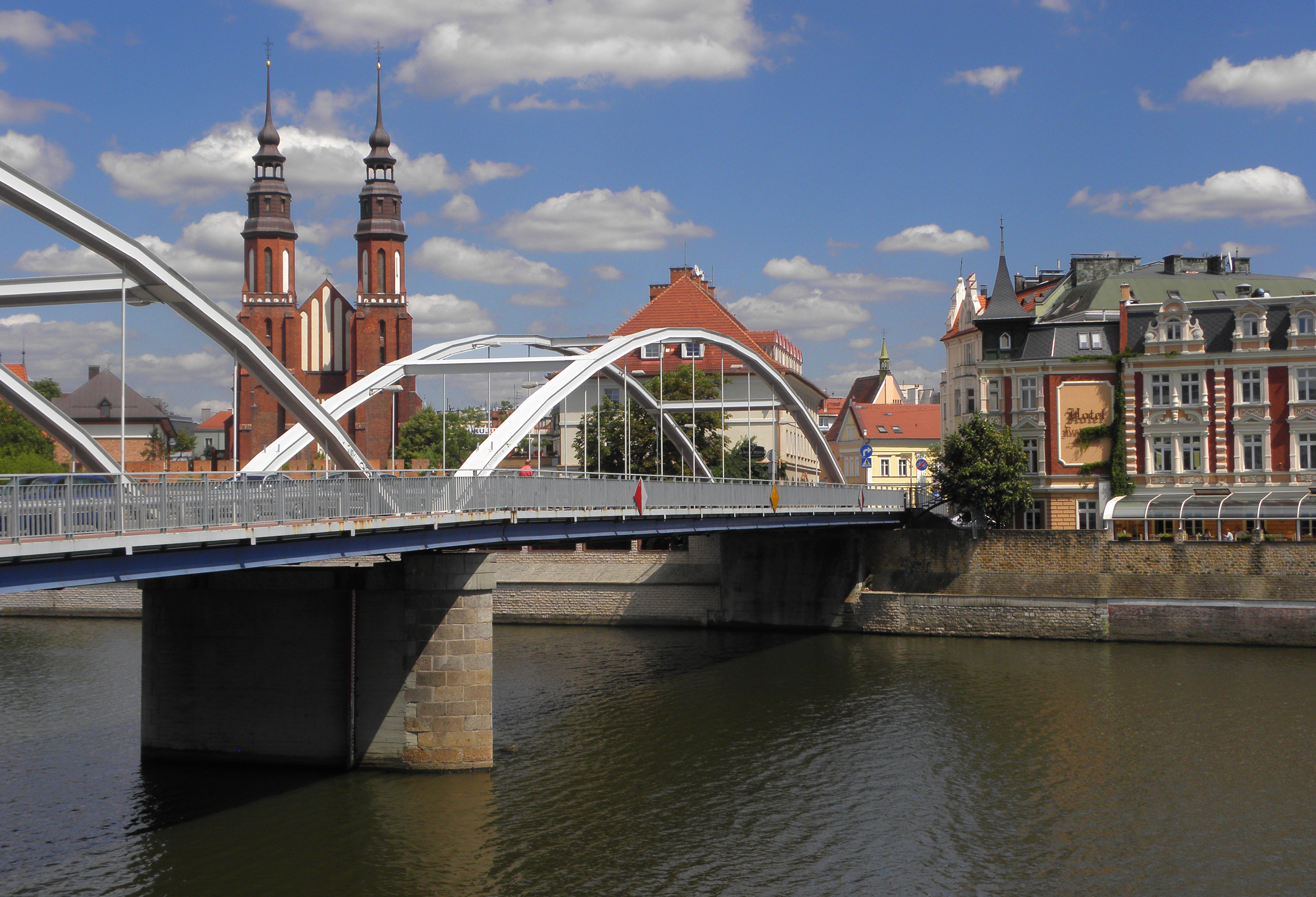
Piast Bridge and Opole Cathedral in the background with its two iconic Gothic towers

=== In modern Poland ===
After the end of the Second World War in 1945, Oppeln was transferred from Germany to Poland, pursuant to the agreements of the Potsdam Conference, and given its Slavic name of Opole. Opole became part of the Katowice Voivodeship from 1946–1950, after which it became part of the Opole Voivodeship. Unlike other parts of the so-called Recovered Territories, Opole and the surrounding region's indigenous population partly remained although the majority was expelled as elsewhere. Over 1 million Silesians who considered themselves Poles or were treated as such by the authorities due to their language and customs were allowed to stay after they were verified as Poles in a special verification process. It involved declaring Polish nationality and an oath of allegiance to the Polish nation. Additionally, many Poles displaced from the former Polish Kresy annexed by the USSR (for example Lwów) came to Opole and the surrounding area and settled here after the Second World War.

In later years, however, many Germans (and German Silesians) left for West Germany to flee the communist Eastern Bloc (see Emigration from Poland to Germany after World War II). Today, Opole, along with the surrounding region, is known as a centre of the German minority in Poland that recruits mainly from the descendants of the positively verified autochthons. In the city itself, however, only 2.46% of the inhabitants declared German nationality according to the last national census of 2002.

On 1 January 2017 Borki, Chmielowice, Czarnowąsy, Krzanowice, Sławice, Świerkle, Winów, Wrzoski, Żerkowice as well as parts of Brzezie, Dobrzeń Mały and Karczów became a part of Opole, increasing its population by about 9,500, and its area by over 5,300 ha, despite the protests of inhabitants.

== Historical population ==
Historical population
Year	Pop.	±%
1925	41,507	—
1939	52,977	+27.6%
1950	38,464	−27.4%
1960	63,500	+65.1%
1970	86,900	+36.9%
1978	111,266	+28.0%
1988	126,404	+13.6%
2002	129,946	+2.8%
2011	131,867	+1.5%
2021	127,387	−3.4%

In the early 20th century the number of Polish and bilingual citizens of Opole, according to the official German statistics, varied from 25 to 31%.

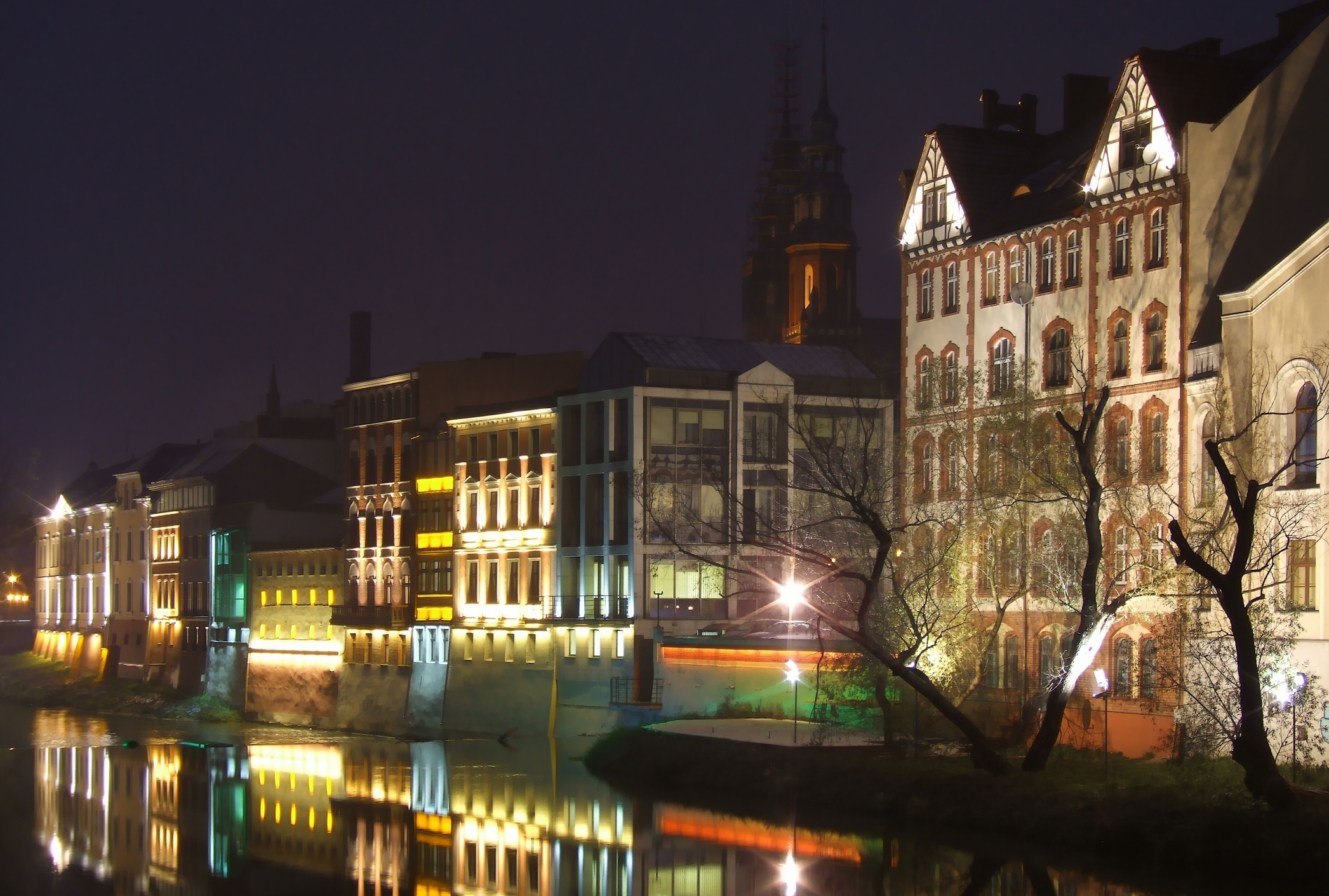
Water canal along the Old Town

=== German minority ===
Alongside German and Polish, many citizens of the city before 1945 used a strongly German-influenced Silesian dialect (sometimes called wasserpolnisch or wasserpolak). Because of this, the post-war Polish state administration after the annexation of Silesia in 1945 did not initiate a general expulsion of all former inhabitants of Opole, as was done in Lower Silesia, for instance, where the population almost exclusively spoke the German language. Because they were considered "autochthonous" (Polish), the Wasserpolak-speakers instead received the right to remain in their homeland after declaring themselves as Poles. Some German speakers took advantage of this decision, allowing them to remain in Opole, even when they considered themselves to be of German nationality. The city surroundings currently contain the largest German and Upper Silesian minorities in Poland. However, Opole itself is only 2.46% German. (See also Germans of Poland.)

== Main sights ==
Opole hosts the annual National Festival of Polish Song. The city is also known for its 10th-century Church of St. Adalbert and the 14th-century Church of the Holy Cross. There is a zoo, the Ogród Zoologiczny w Opolu.

Structures and buildings

- Piast Tower on the island, the only part that remained of the medieval Piast Castle, the local residence of the dukes of Opole
- Holy Trinity Church, a 14th-century Gothic Franciscan church, which contains a mausoleum of the dukes of the Opole line of the Piast dynasty
- a 19th-century Town Hall
- the Church of our Lady of Sorrows and St. Adalbert (Kościół Matki Boskiej Bolesnej i św. Wojciecha)
- the 14th-century Holy Cross Cathedral (Bazylika katedralna Podwyższenia Krzyża Świętego), which contains the Piast Chapel with the tomb of Jan II the Good, the last duke of Opole from the Piast dynasty
- The art nouveau Penny Bridge (Most Groszowy), currently named Green Bridge (Zielony Mostek)
- Opole Main Station, an eclectic building from early 20th century.

Museums

- Diocesan Museum (Muzeum Diecezjalne)
- Opole Regional Museum (Muzeum Śląska Opolskiego)
- Opole Village Museum (Muzeum Wsi Opolskiej)
- Central POW Museum (Centralne Muzeum Jeńców Wojennych)

Cemetery

- The Jewish Cemetery in Opole was established in 1822, and it is a peculiar pantheon of the Jews of Opole.

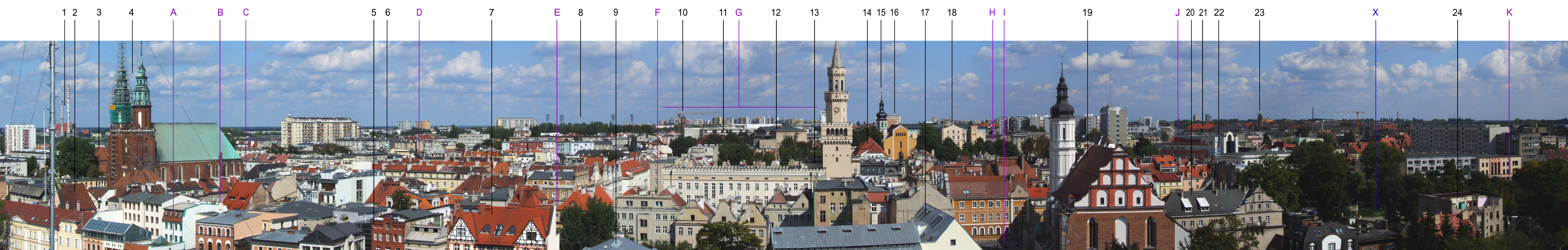
Opole - a view of the city centre

== Geography ==
Opole is one of the warmest cities in Poland. The national all-time heat record was measured in Prószków, near Opole. The climate is oceanic with sizeable continental influences.

Climate data for Opole (1991–2020 normals, extremes 1951–present)
Month	Jan	Feb	Mar	Apr	May	Jun	Jul	Aug	Sep	Oct	Nov	Dec	Year
Record high °C (°F)	15.8 (60.4)	19.9 (67.8)	24.5 (76.1)	29.3 (84.7)	33.9 (93.0)	36.0 (96.8)	37.1 (98.8)	37.9 (100.2)	35.4 (95.7)	26.8 (80.2)	21.9 (71.4)	15.2 (59.4)	37.9 (100.2)
Mean daily maximum °C (°F)	2.5 (36.5)	4.3 (39.7)	8.9 (48.0)	15.5 (59.9)	20.2 (68.4)	23.6 (74.5)	25.8 (78.4)	25.6 (78.1)	20.1 (68.2)	14.2 (57.6)	8.2 (46.8)	3.5 (38.3)	14.4 (57.9)
Daily mean °C (°F)	−0.5 (31.1)	0.7 (33.3)	4.1 (39.4)	9.6 (49.3)	14.2 (57.6)	17.8 (64.0)	19.7 (67.5)	19.4 (66.9)	14.5 (58.1)	9.6 (49.3)	5.0 (41.0)	0.8 (33.4)	9.6 (49.3)
Mean daily minimum °C (°F)	−3.4 (25.9)	−2.5 (27.5)	0.0 (32.0)	4.0 (39.2)	8.5 (47.3)	12.2 (54.0)	14.0 (57.2)	13.7 (56.7)	9.6 (49.3)	5.8 (42.4)	2.1 (35.8)	−1.9 (28.6)	5.2 (41.4)
Record low °C (°F)	−28.0 (−18.4)	−29.7 (−21.5)	−22.3 (−8.1)	−6.8 (19.8)	−2.5 (27.5)	−0.1 (31.8)	4.8 (40.6)	3.4 (38.1)	−2.6 (27.3)	−7.5 (18.5)	−12.9 (8.8)	−26.3 (−15.3)	−29.7 (−21.5)
Average precipitation mm (inches)	31.5 (1.24)	29.0 (1.14)	35.2 (1.39)	36.9 (1.45)	62.6 (2.46)	78.2 (3.08)	89.4 (3.52)	54.2 (2.13)	56.7 (2.23)	41.5 (1.63)	37.8 (1.49)	31.9 (1.26)	585.0 (23.03)
Average extreme snow depth cm (inches)	6.4 (2.5)	6.0 (2.4)	3.5 (1.4)	0.9 (0.4)	0.0 (0.0)	0.0 (0.0)	0.0 (0.0)	0.0 (0.0)	0.0 (0.0)	0.4 (0.2)	2.4 (0.9)	4.2 (1.7)	6.4 (2.5)
Average precipitation days (≥ 0.1 mm)	15.83	13.63	14.37	10.93	13.17	13.27	13.37	11.63	11.33	12.83	13.80	14.83	159.00
Average snowy days (≥ 0 cm)	14.9	11.3	4.7	0.7	0.0	0.0	0.0	0.0	0.0	0.2	3.2	8.3	43.3
Average relative humidity (%)	84.0	80.4	75.3	68.9	71.8	72.1	71.3	71.9	78.0	81.8	85.0	85.1	77.2
Mean monthly sunshine hours	56.1	77.6	129.4	197.5	239.4	243.0	257.2	247.4	170.0	118.2	66.9	49.6	1,852.3
Source 1: Institute of Meteorology and Water Management
Source 2: Meteomodel.pl (records, relative humidity 1991–2020)

== Education ==
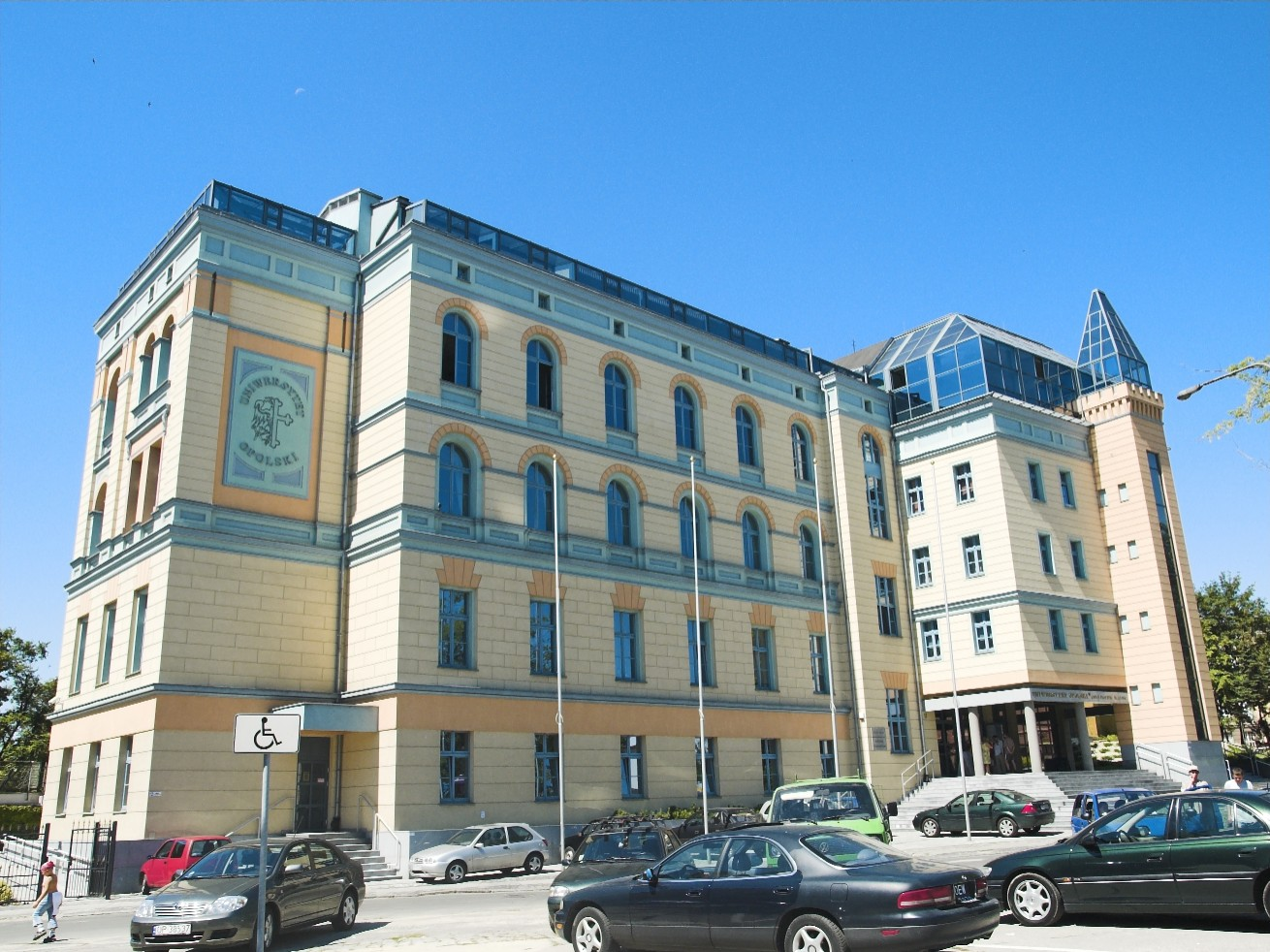
The building of Collegium Maius of Opole University

- state-run universities and colleges:
  - Opole University of Technology (Politechnika Opolska)
  - University of Opole (Uniwersytet Opolski)
- privately run colleges:
  - Management and Administration College in Opole (Wyższa Szkoła Zarządzania i Administracji w Opolu)
  - Bogdan Jański Academy (Szkoła Wyższa im. Bogdana Jańskiego)
  - WSB Merito Universities - WSB Merito University in Wrocław, departments of Economics

== Politics ==
Administrative subdivisions (districts) of Opole

Members of Parliament (Sejm) elected from Opole constituency

- Danuta Jazłowiecka, KO
- Tadeusz Jarmuziewicz, KO
- Ryszard Knosala, KO
- Leszek Korzeniowski, KO
- Sławomir Kłosowski, PiS
- Teresa Ceglecka-Zielonka, PiS
- Mieczysław Walkiewicz, PiS
- Henryk Kroll, German minority
- Ryszard Galla, German minority
- Józef Stępkowski, Samoobrona
- Sandra Lewandowska, Samoobrona
- Tomasz Garbowski, SLD
- Marek Kawa, LPR

== Economy ==
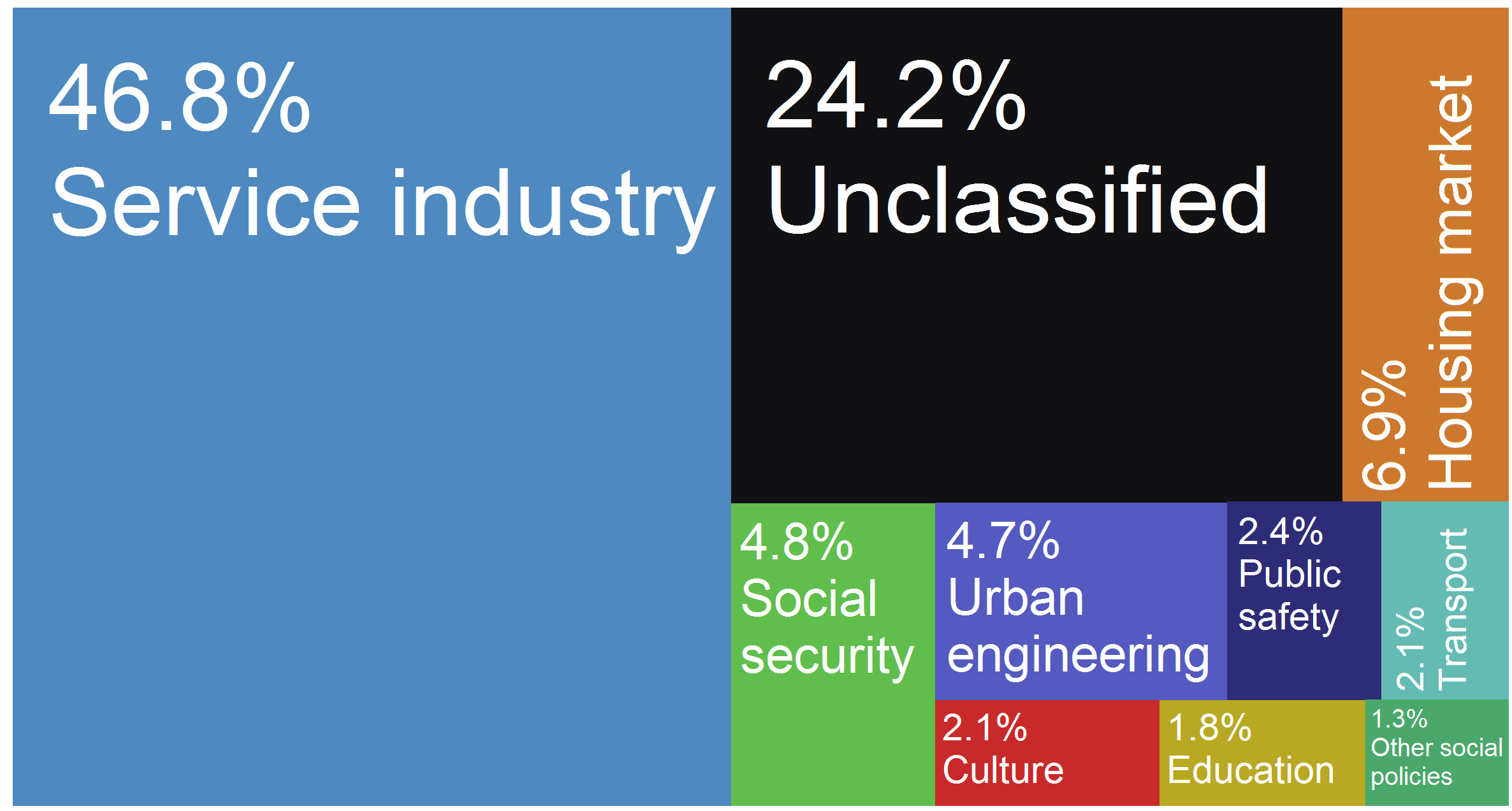
Opole city budget income sources as of 2015.

Opole is the Opole Voivodeship's centre for commerce, banking, industrial complexes and other major service sector industries.

Prior to World War II, due to major limestone deposits in Opole's vicinity, the city developed as a centre for cement production in Germany, with the Cementownia "Odra" being active till this day. The French building materials company Lafarge is also active in the area, having its roofing division, Lafarge Roofing, together with its German subsidiary Schiedel (chimney manufacturing) based in Opole.

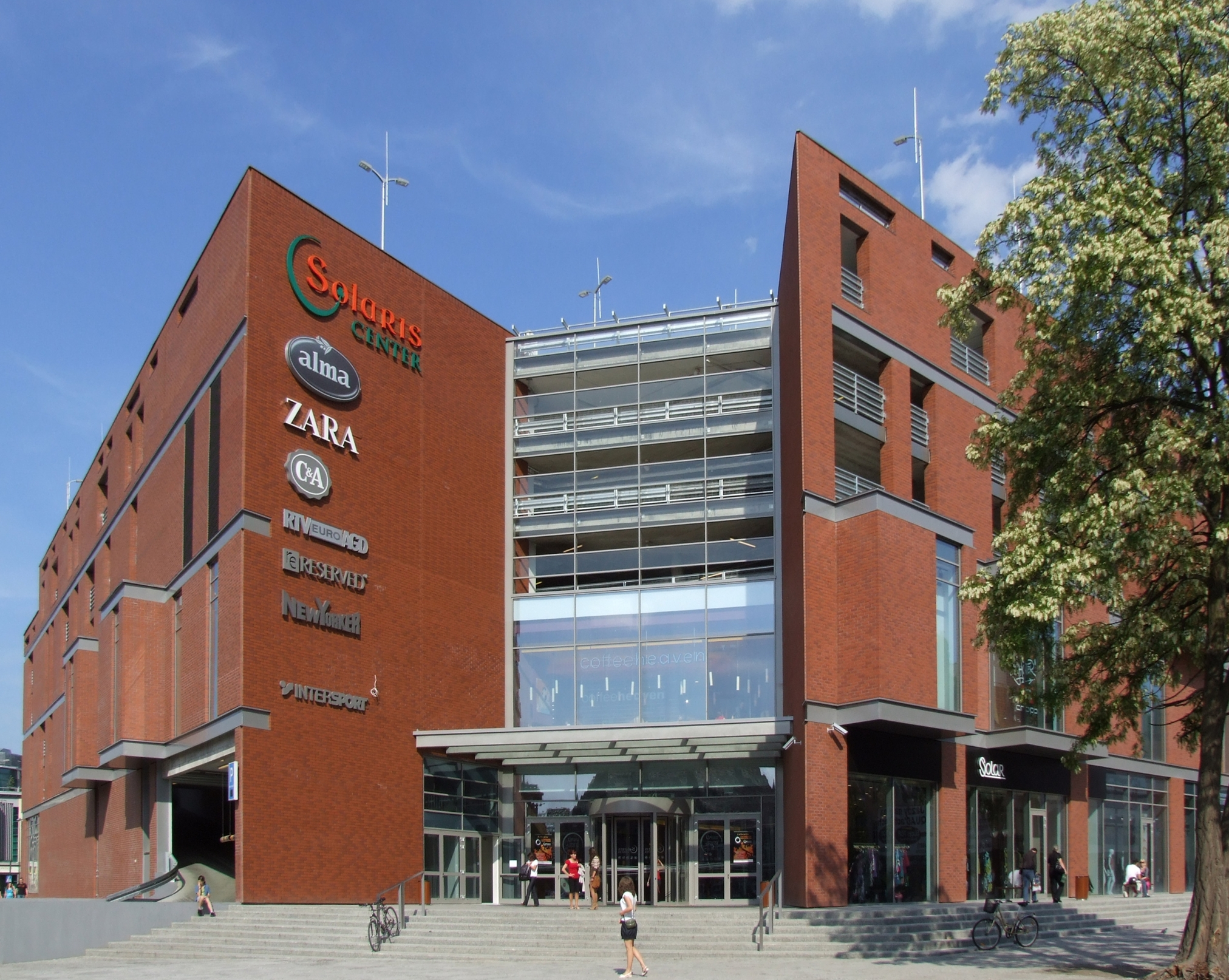
Solaris Centre Mall

Other companies in the city include: IT companies: Atmoterm SA, the German valve manufacturer Kludi; the German men's fashion manufacturer Ahlers and the American automotive manufacturer Tower Automotive. As is the case with the entire Opole Voivodeship, there is a strong presence of food industry services in the city. The largest companies in the food sector include: Zott, the Dutch baby food and nutrition company Nutricia, part of the Danone food-products corporation.

Opole has branches of all major banks, including: PKO, Pekao, Deutsche Bank and Raiffeisen Zentralbank.

The retail sector in Opole includes major Metro AG brand stores: Metro Cash and Carry and Media-Saturn-Holding, as well as Real. The city has a plethora of other major supermarket chains, namely: the Polish supermarket chains Biedronka, Lidl, Aldi and Netto. Other major brand stores include the shoe retailer Deichmann and Rossmann drugstores.

Furthermore, the city has three major shopping centres. The Solaris Center, with a total of 86 shops, opened in May 2009 and is located in the centre of Mikołaj Kopernik Square. In the city's suburbs, by Wrocławska Street (ul. Wrocławska) is the location of Karolinka Shopping Centre (Centrum Handlowe Karolinka). The shopping centre, which opened in September 2008, has a total area of 38,000 m^{2}, with a total of 99 stores, including fashion, hardware and electronics stores. To the east of the city, by the National Road 46, is the smallest of the three shopping centres, Turawa Park, with a total of 50 stores. Other shopping centres include Galeria Opolanin, built between 1974 and 1981 and upon its completion, was the largest shopping centre in Poland.

== Sports ==
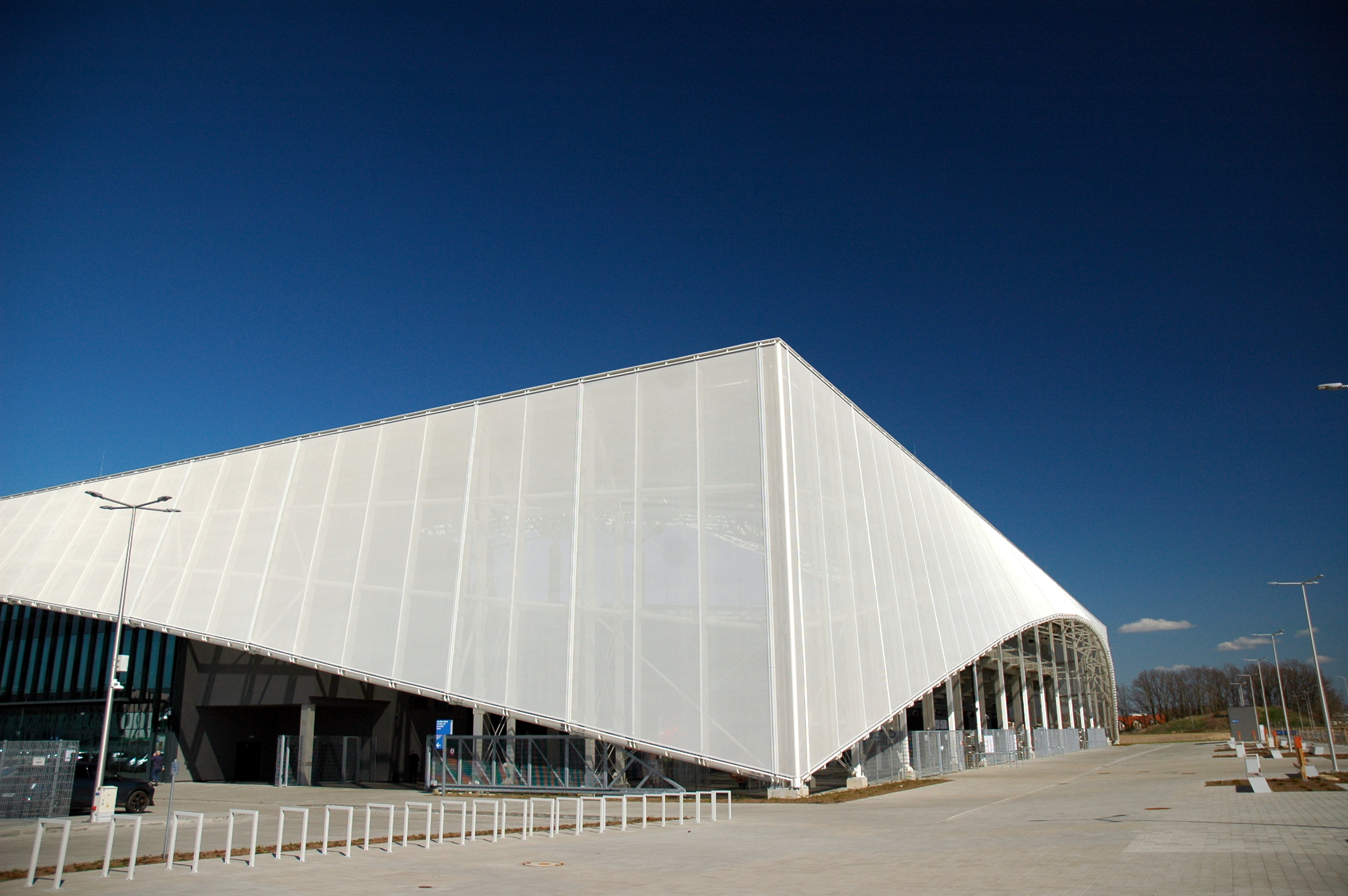
Itaka Arena, home venue of Odra Opole

Among the city's sports team are:

- Odra Opole – football club, playing in the Polish second division. From the 1950s to the 1980s the team competed in the country's top-flight, finishing 3rd in 1964.
- Orlik Opole – ice hockey club, playing in the Polish Hockey League, the country's top division.
- Kolejarz Opole – speedway club who race at the Marian Spychała Speedway Stadium and compete in the Polish leagues. In the 1970s and 1980s, the team competed in the country's top-flight, finishing 3rd in 1970.
- Gwardia Opole – handball club, playing in the Polish Superliga, the country's top division, and finishing 3rd in 1964 and, recently, in 2019.
- Rodło Opole – football club, originally formed in 1996 as a youth side now have a team competing in the lower leagues.

== Notable people ==
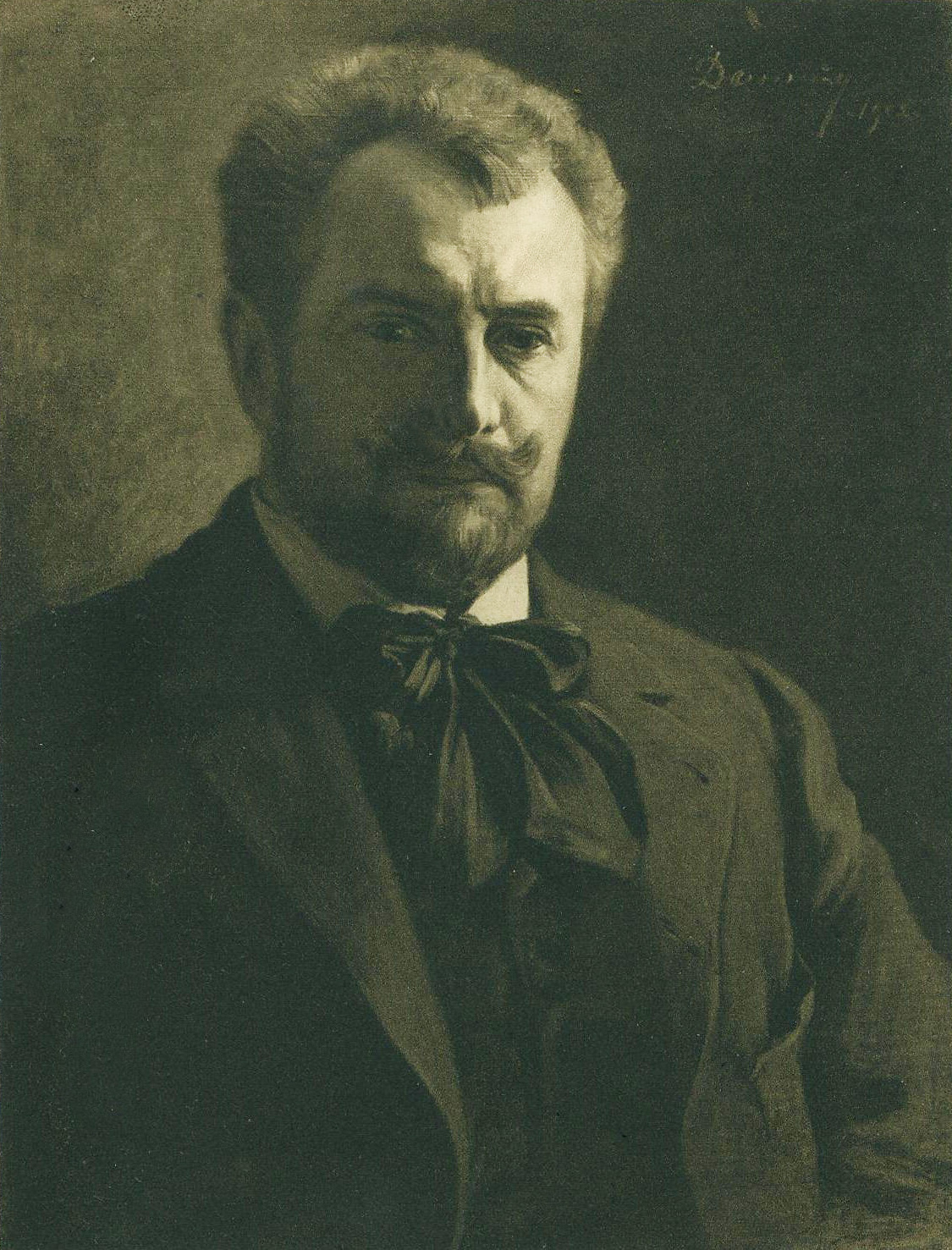
Jan Kasprowicz

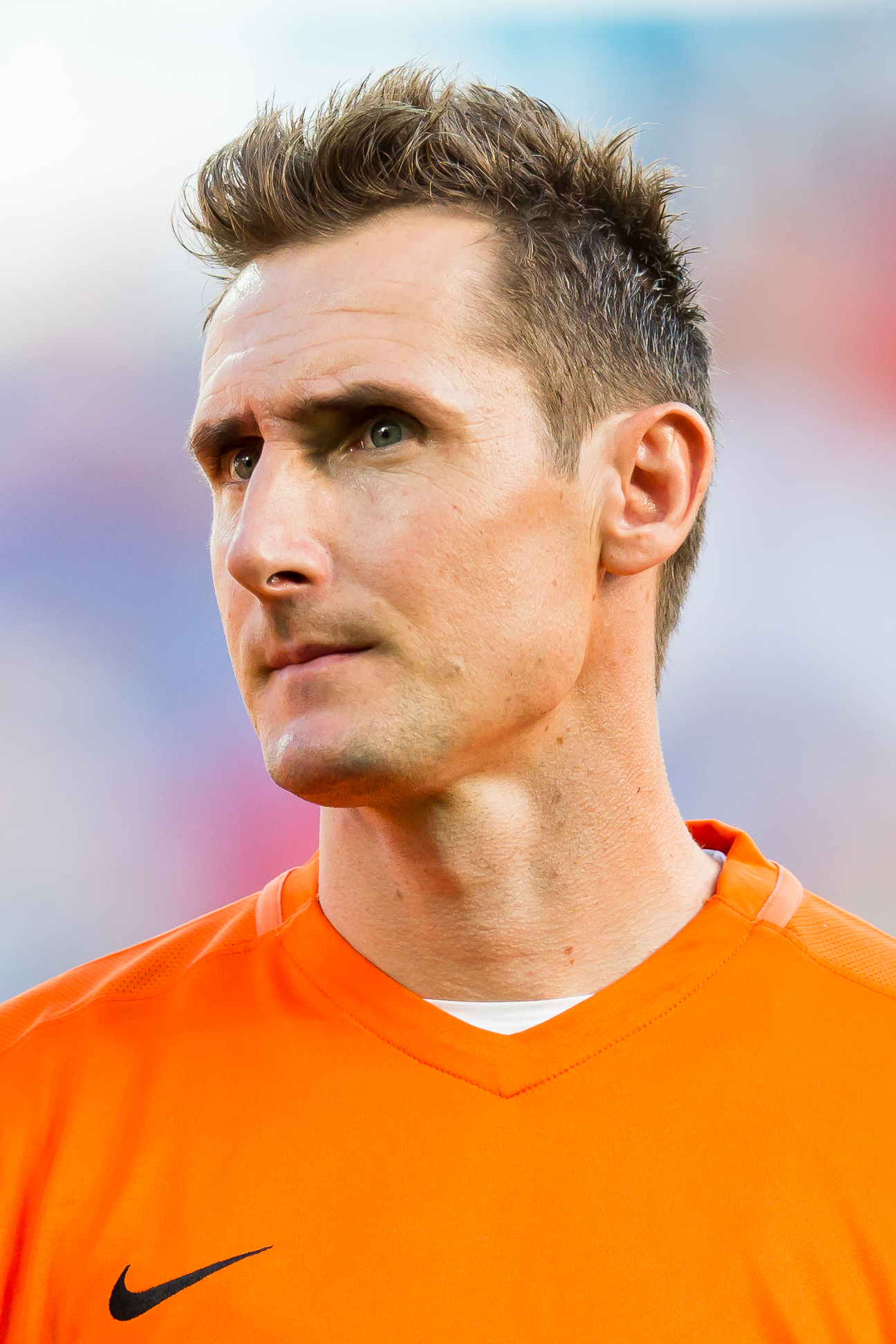
Miroslav Klose

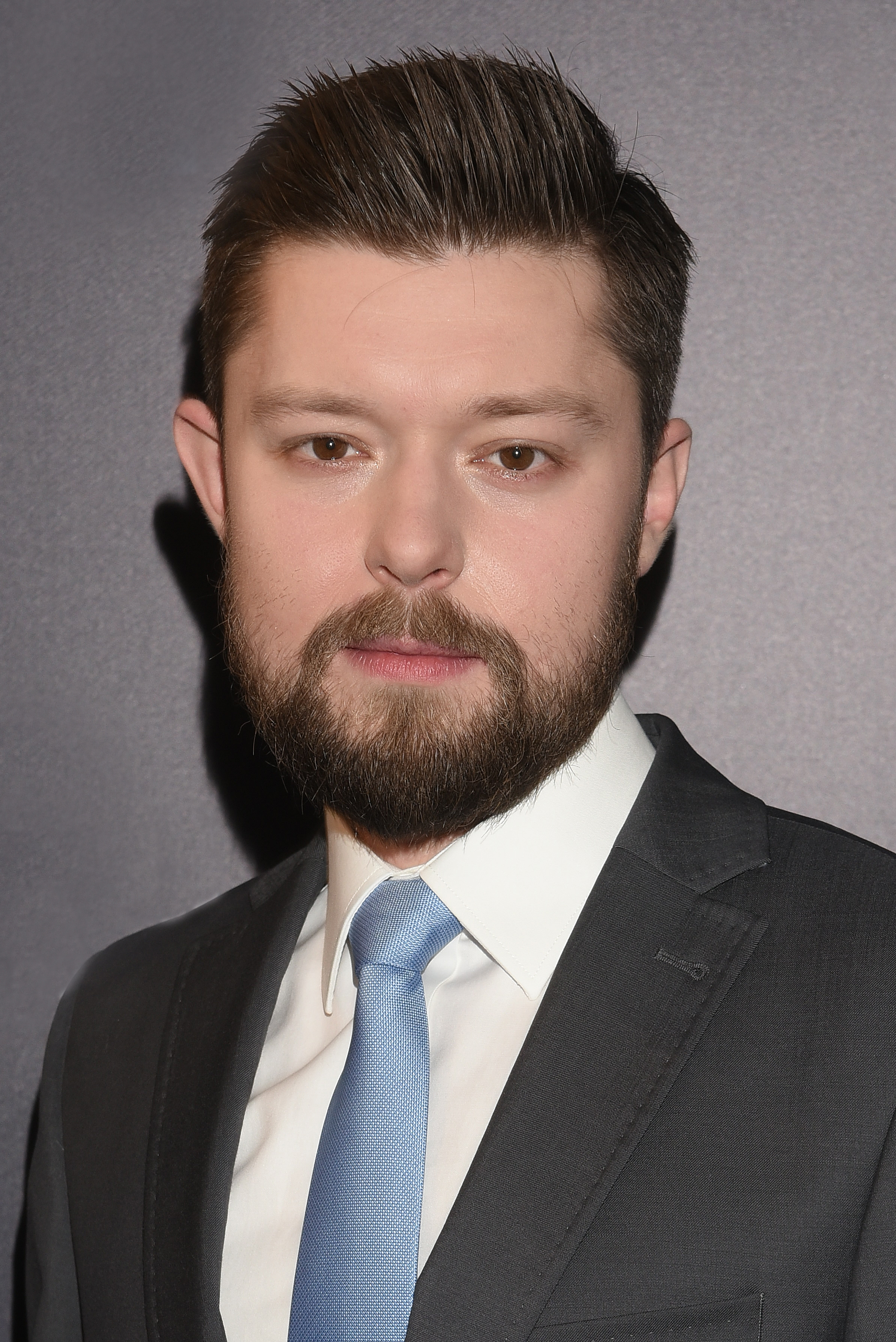
Remigiusz Mróz

- Leo Baeck (1873–1956), rabbi
- Anna Brzezińska (born 1971), fantasy writer
- Jerzy Buzek (born 1940), academic and politician, President of the European Parliament, former Prime Minister of Poland
- Jan Fethke (1903–1980), film director
- Damian Grabowski (born 1980), mixed martial artist
- Jerzy Grotowski (1933–1999), theater director
- Danuta Jazłowiecka (born 1957), politician
- Jakub Kania (1872–1957), Polish poet and writer, soldier in the Silesian Uprisings
- Jan Kasprowicz (1860–1926), poet
- Paul Kleinert (1837–1920), German theologian
- Miroslav Klose (born 1978), football player (playing in the Germany national football team)
- Bronisław Koraszewski (1863–1924), Polish activist, founder of Gazeta Opolska
- Szymon Koszyk (1891–1972), reporter, teacher and Polish activist from Opole
- Wilhelm Kuhnert (1865–1926), painter, author, and illustrator
- Andrzej Jerzy Lech (born 1955), artist and photographer
- Simon Bar Jona Madelka (before 1550–c. 1598), Czech composer
- Chester Marcol (born 1949), American football placekicker for the Green Bay Packers
- Rochus Misch (1917–2013), communications' chief of the Reichskanzlei and member of the Leibstandarte-SS Adolf Hitler
- Jacek Morajko (born 1981), cyclist
- Remigiusz Mróz (born 1987), writer
- Marcin Ociepa (born 1984), politician
- Edmund Osmańczyk (1913–1989), reporter, politician (6 times elected to the sejm and once to the senate)
- Emin Pasha (born Eduard Schnitzer) (1840–1892), explorer and governor of Africa
- Bolesław Polnar (born 1952), graphic artist and painter
- Joachim Prinz (1902–1988), rabbi, born here
- Oscar Slater (1872–1948), German/Scottish victim of miscarriage of justice
- Krzysztof Szramiak (born 1984), Polish weightlifter
- Maksymilian Szuber (born 2002), Polish-German ice hockey player
- Bronisław Trentowski (1808–1869), Polish philosopher, pedagogist and journalist
- Vladislaus II of Opole, count palatine of Poland 1378
- Karolina Wydra (born 1981), actress
- Piotr Zioła (born 1995), rock singer

== Twin towns – sister cities ==
Opole is twinned with:

- Alytus, Lithuania
- Bruntál, Czech Republic
- Carrara, Italy
- Grasse, France
- Ingolstadt, Germany
- Ivano-Frankivsk, Ukraine
- Kuopio, Finland
- Mülheim an der Ruhr, Germany
- Potsdam, Germany
- Roanoke, United States
- Székesfehérvár, Hungary

== Gallery ==
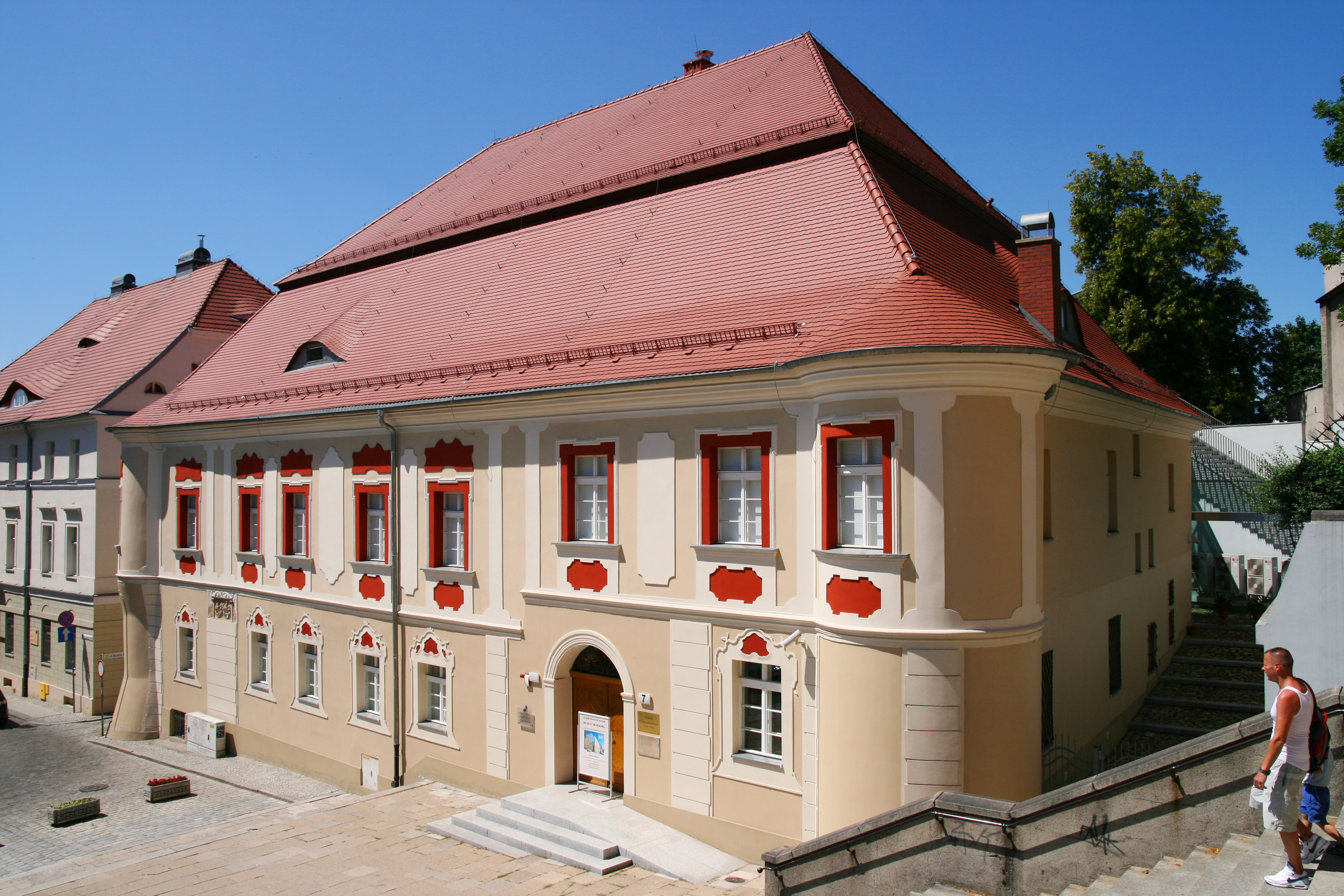
Jesuit College, now a regional museum

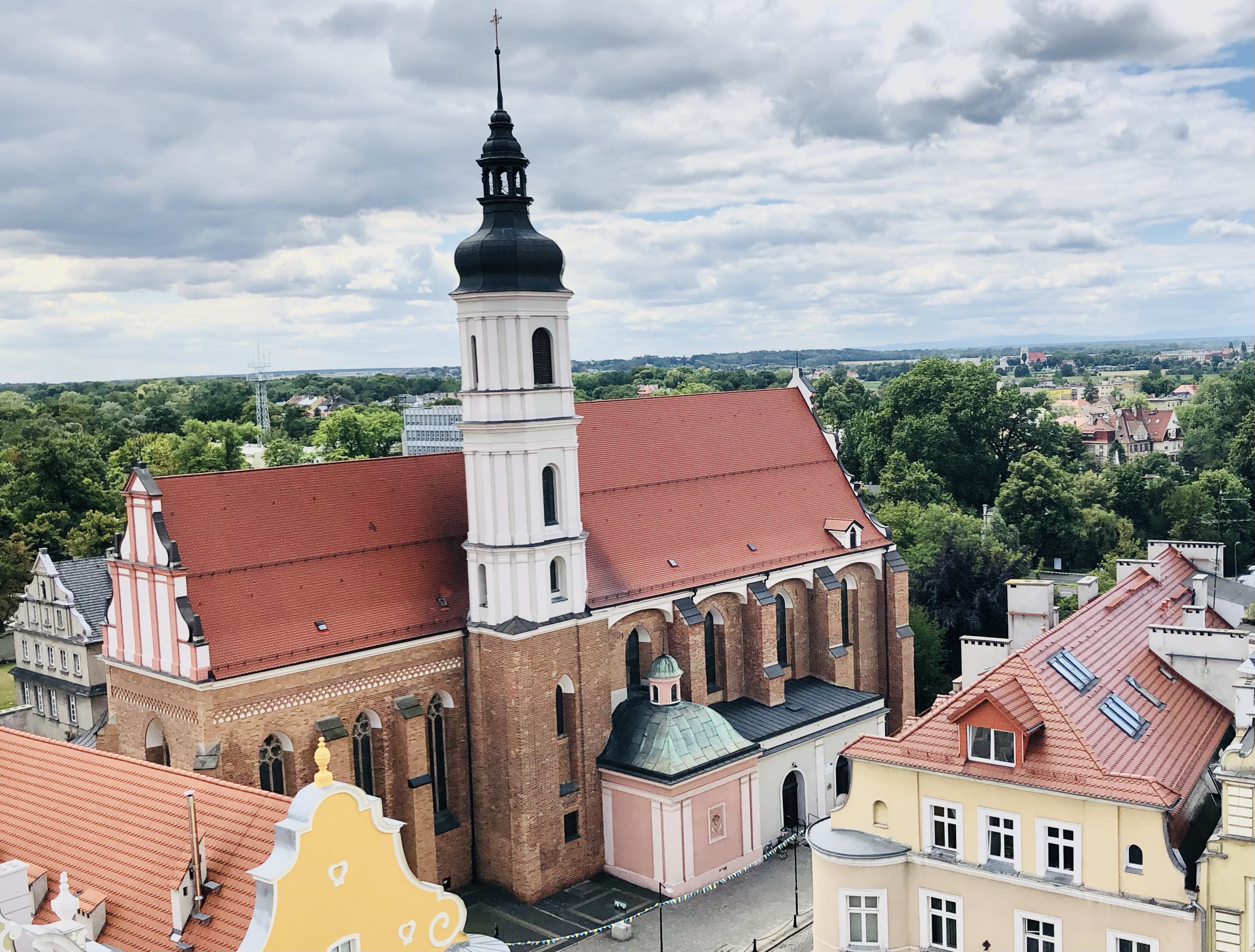
Church of the Holy Trinity

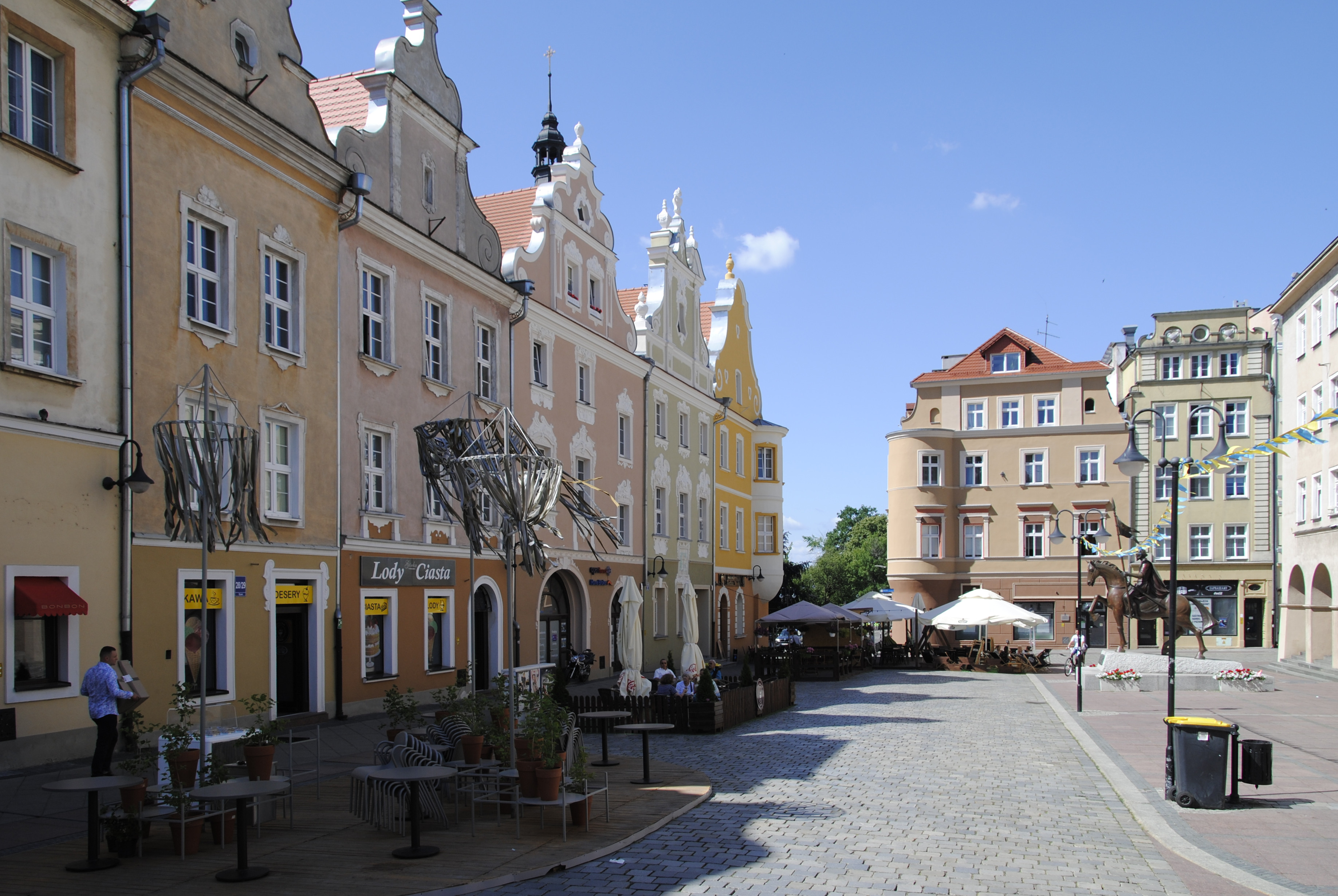
Rynek (Market Square) filled with historic townhouses

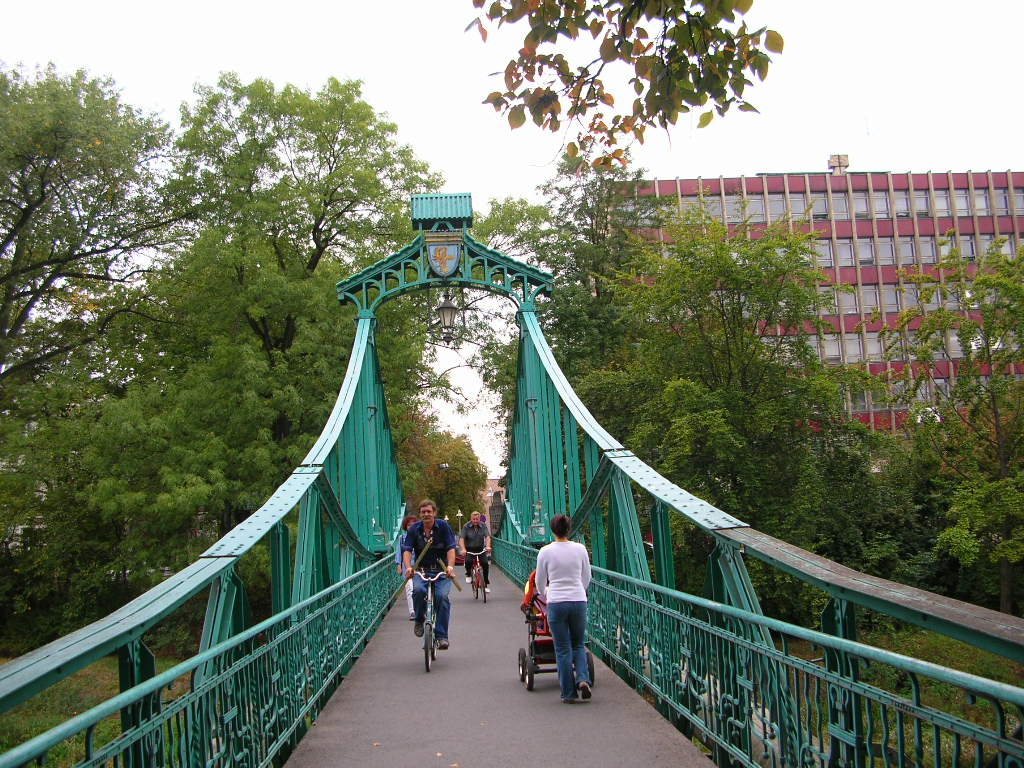
Green Bridge

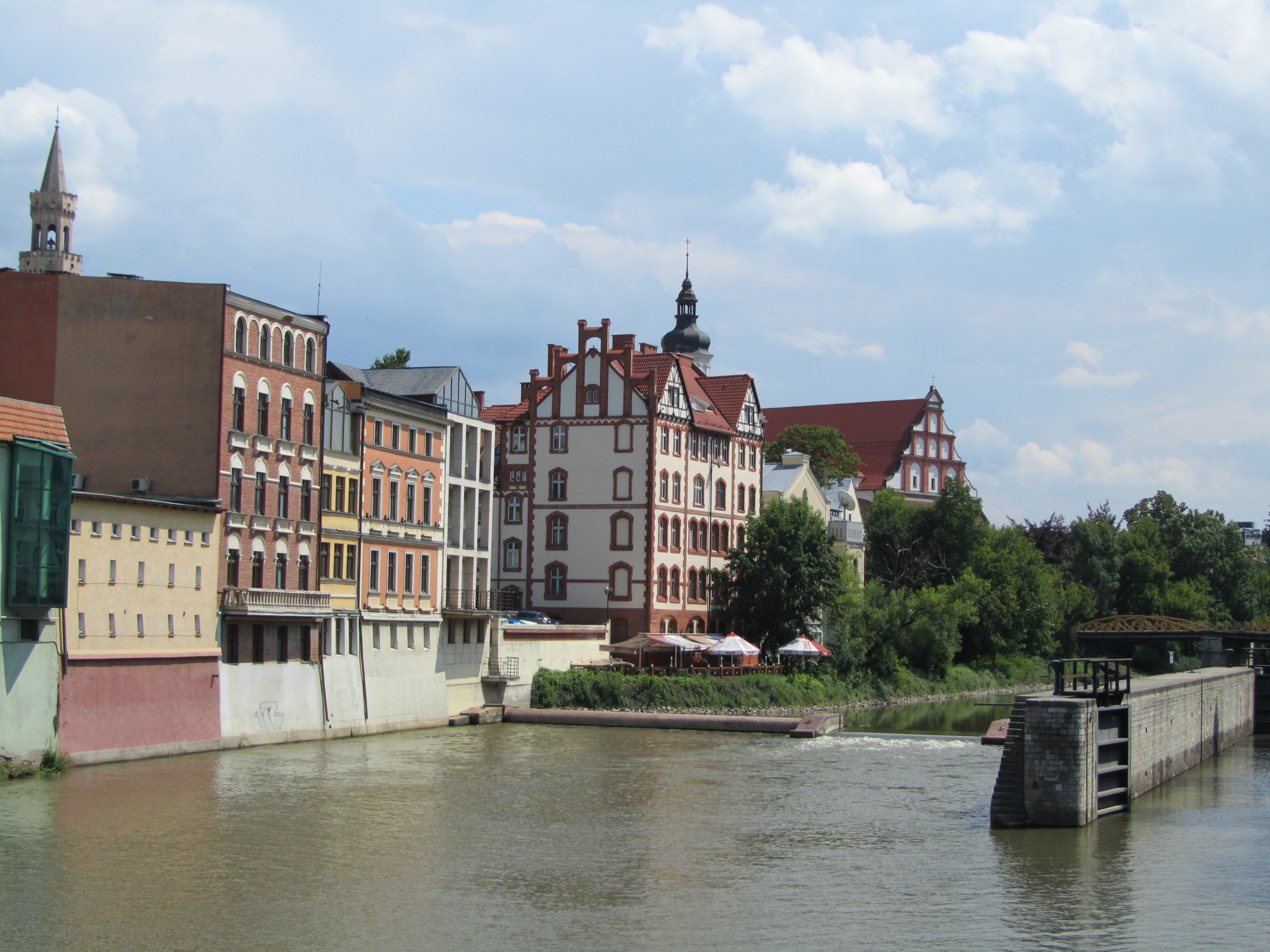
Młynówka Canal (Little Venice)

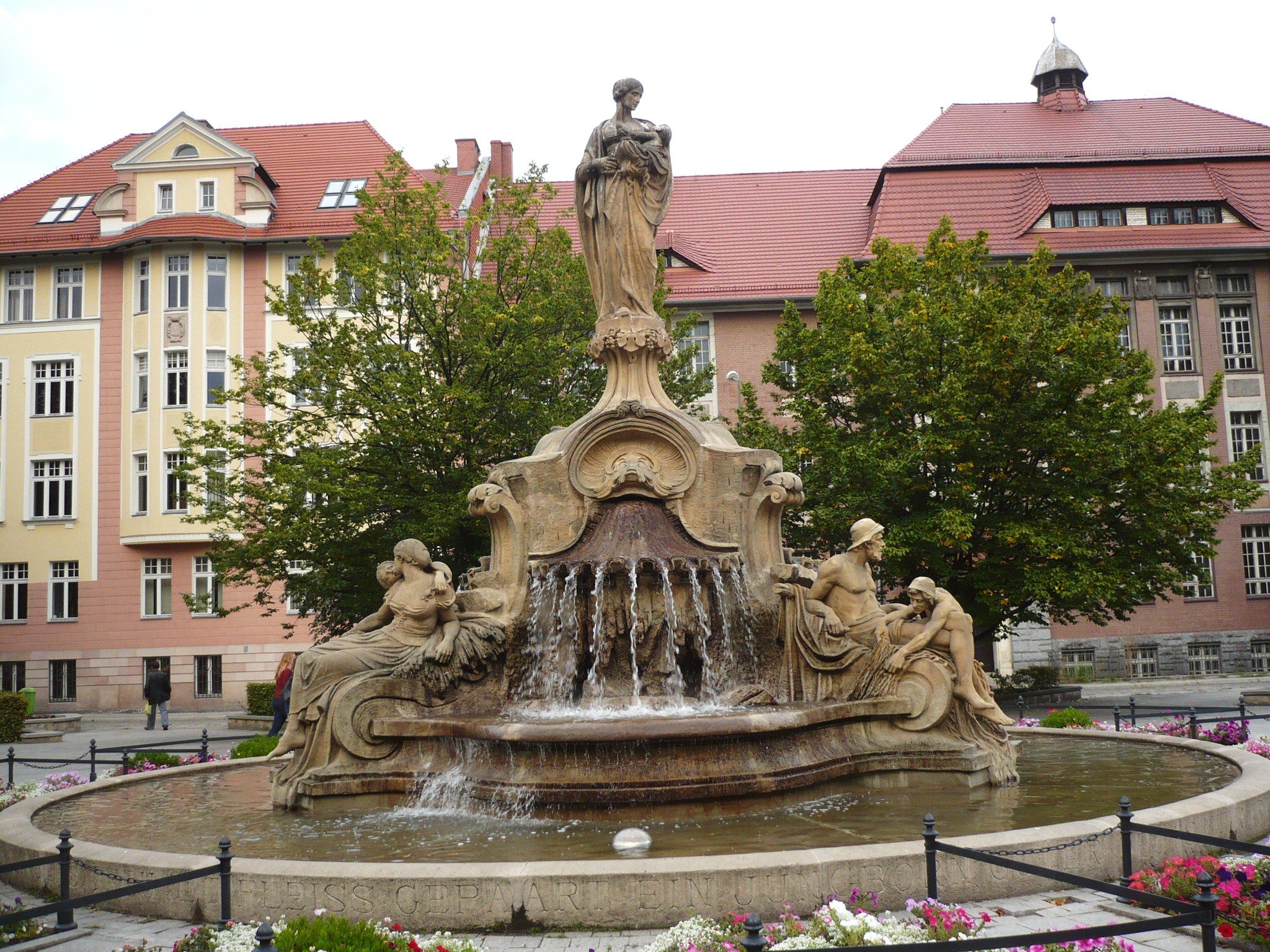
Ceres Fountain

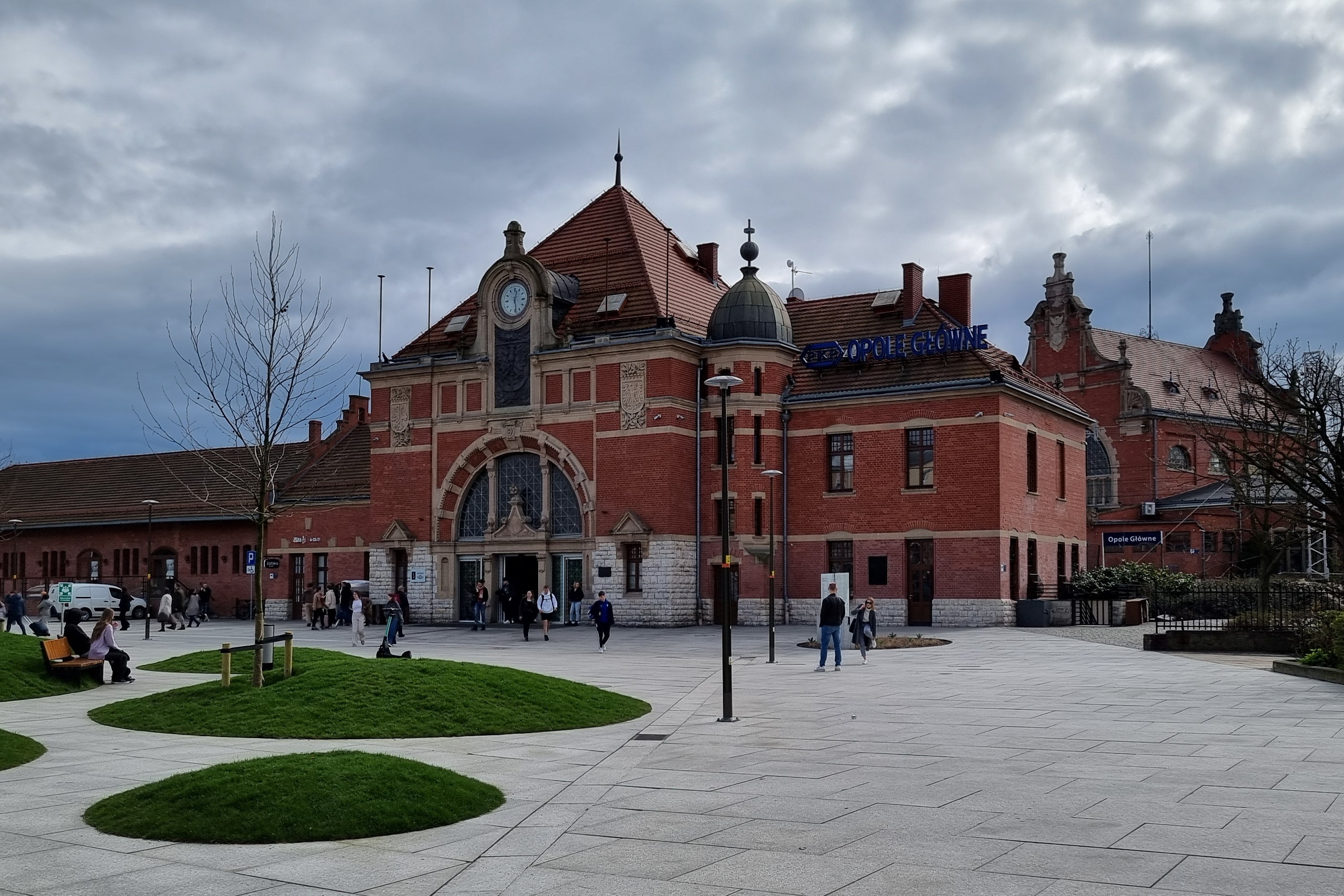
Opole Główne railway station

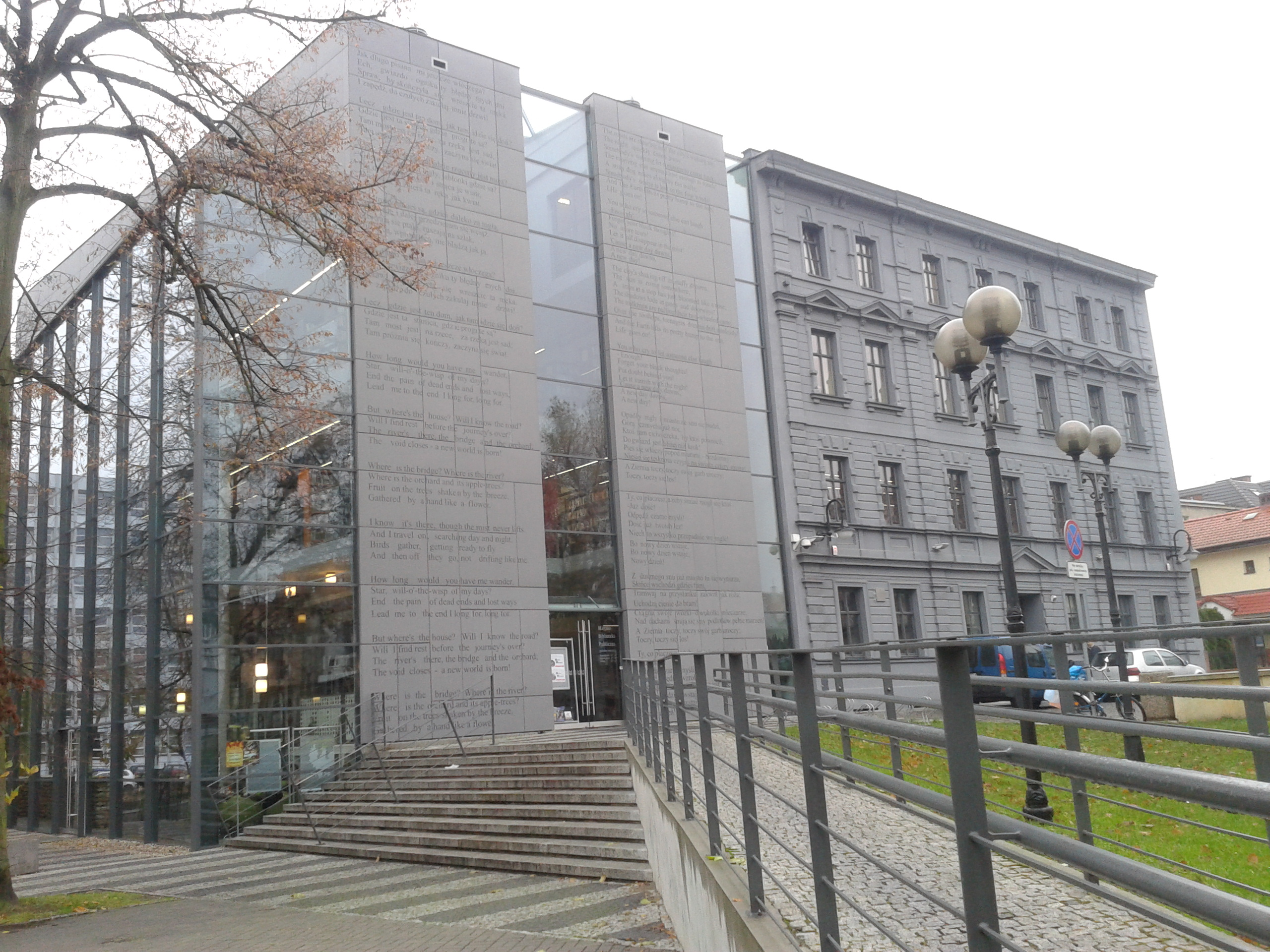
John Paul II Library

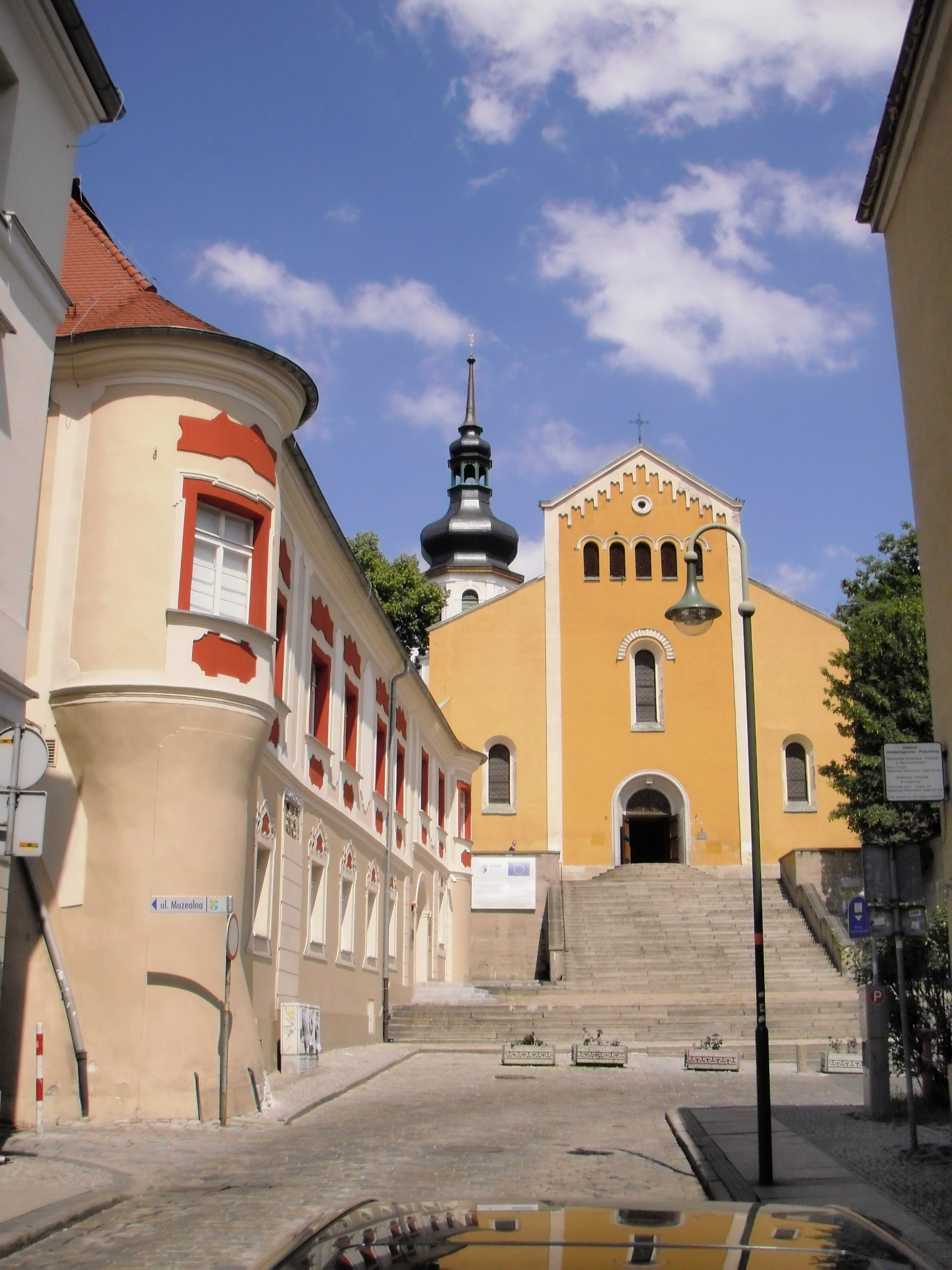
Church of St. Adalbert, also known as the "Church on the Rock" and "Church on the Hill"

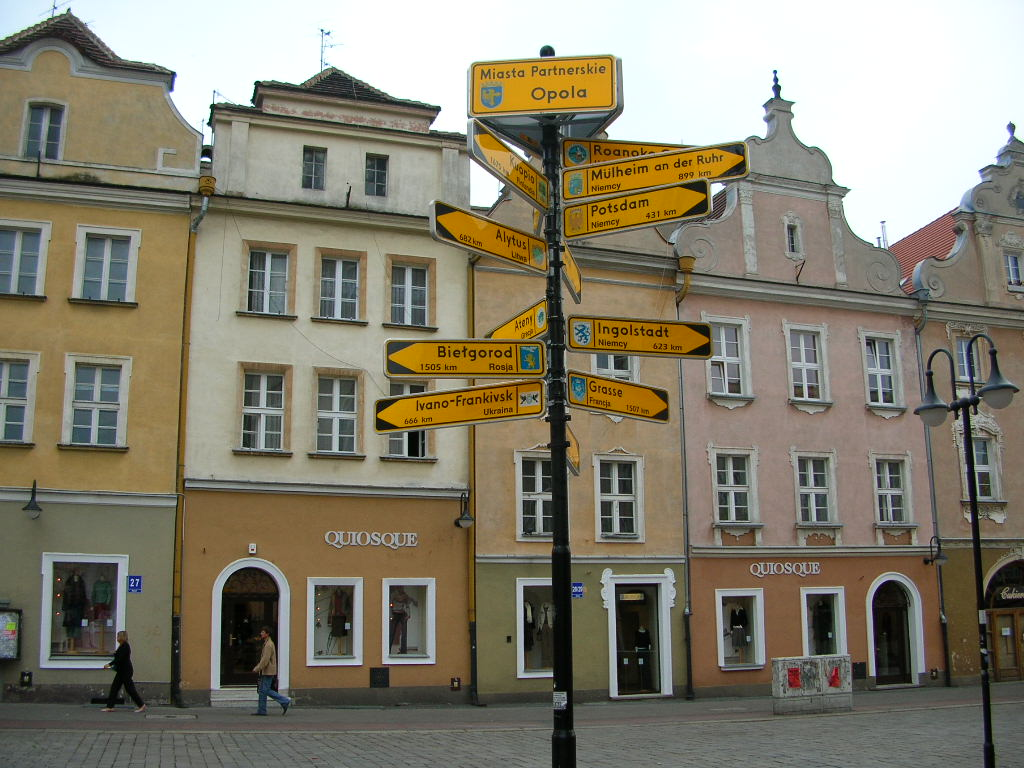
Signs showing direction of twin cities

== Citations ==
=== Bibliography ===
- The Columbia Electronic Encyclopedia. "Opole". Columbia University Press. Accessed 4 June 2006.
