= Bronisław Koraszewski =

Polish reporter and activist

Bronisław Koraszewski (1863–1924) – Polish reporter and social activist in Upper Silesia. He concentrated on fight with germanisation in the Opole region by editing in Polish and creating Polish organisations. He was the founder, editor and reporter of Gazeta Opolska and of still existing People's Bank in Opole. His name was given to one of Opole's streets that leads from the cathedral to the town square where his house once stood.
