= Dębska Kuźnia =

- Village
- Location within Poland
- Coordinates: 50°40′N 18°7′E
- Country: Poland
- Voivodeship: Opole
- County: Opole
- Gmina: Chrząstowice
- Time zone: UTC+1 (CET)
  - Summer (DST): UTC+2 (CEST)
- Vehicle registration: OPO

Dębska Kuźnia [ˈdɛmpska ˈkuʑɲa] (German: Dembiohammer) is a village in the administrative district of Gmina Chrząstowice in Opole County, Opole Voivodeship, in southern Poland. It is approximately 4 km (2 mi) east of Chrząstowice and 13 km (8 mi) east of the regional capital Opole.
