= Kupilas =

- Village
- Location within Poland
- Coordinates: 50°51′N 17°54′E
- Country: Poland
- Voivodeship: Opole
- County: Opole
- Gmina: Murów
- Population: 7

Kupilas [kuˈpilas] is a village in the administrative district of Gmina Murów, within Opole County, Opole Voivodeship, in south-western Poland.
