= Czarna Woda (disambiguation) =

Czarna Woda is a town in northern Poland.

Czarna Woda ("black water") may also refer to:

- Czarna Woda, Opole Voivodeship, a village south-west Poland
- Czarna Woda, part of the village of Jaworki, Lesser Poland Voivodeship, southern Poland
- Czarna Woda (Kaczawa), a river in Poland
