= Mnichus =

- Village
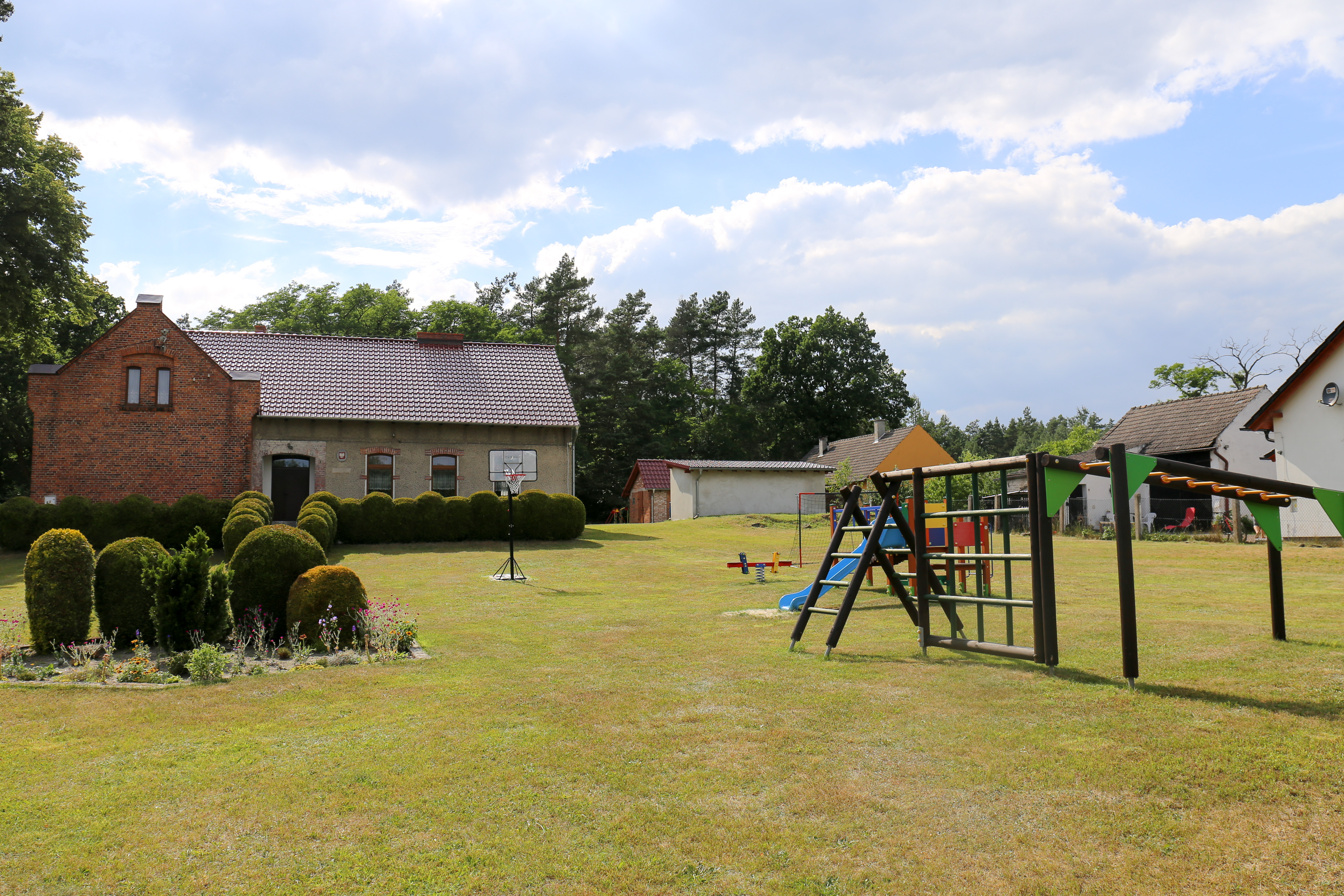

- Location within Poland
- Coordinates: 50°41′46″N 18°18′51″E
- Country: Poland
- Voivodeship: Opole
- County: Opole
- Gmina: Ozimek
- Population: 140

Mnichus [ˈmnixus] (German: Münchhausen) is a village in the administrative district of Gmina Ozimek, within Opole County, Opole Voivodeship, in south-western Poland.
