= Niwki, Gmina Chrząstowice =

Niwki
- Village
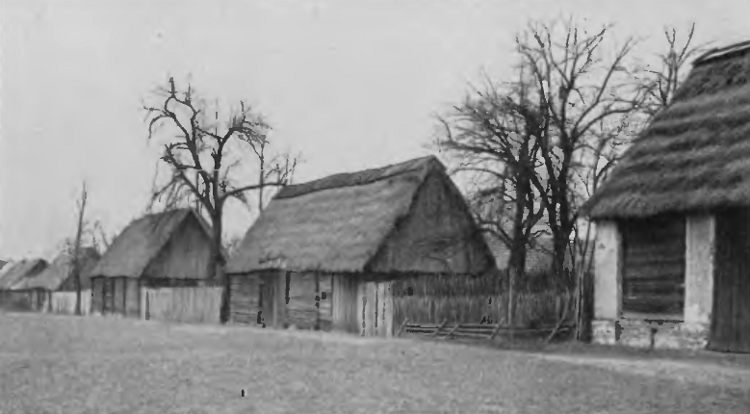

- Location within Poland
- Coordinates: 50°41′42″N 18°5′38″E
- Country: Poland
- Voivodeship: Opole
- County: Opole
- Gmina: Chrząstowice

Niwki [ˈnifki] is a village in the administrative district of Gmina Chrząstowice, within Opole County, Opole Voivodeship, in south-western Poland.

== Notable people ==
- Joachim Halupczok (1968–1994), racing cyclist
