= Okoły =

- Village
- Location within Poland
- Coordinates: 50°52′N 17°55′E
- Country: Poland
- Voivodeship: Opole
- County: Opole
- Gmina: Murów

Okoły [ɔˈkɔwɨ] (German Tauentzinow) is a village in the administrative district of Gmina Murów, within Opole County, Opole Voivodeship, in south-western Poland.
