= Lędziny, Opole Voivodeship =

Lędziny
- Village
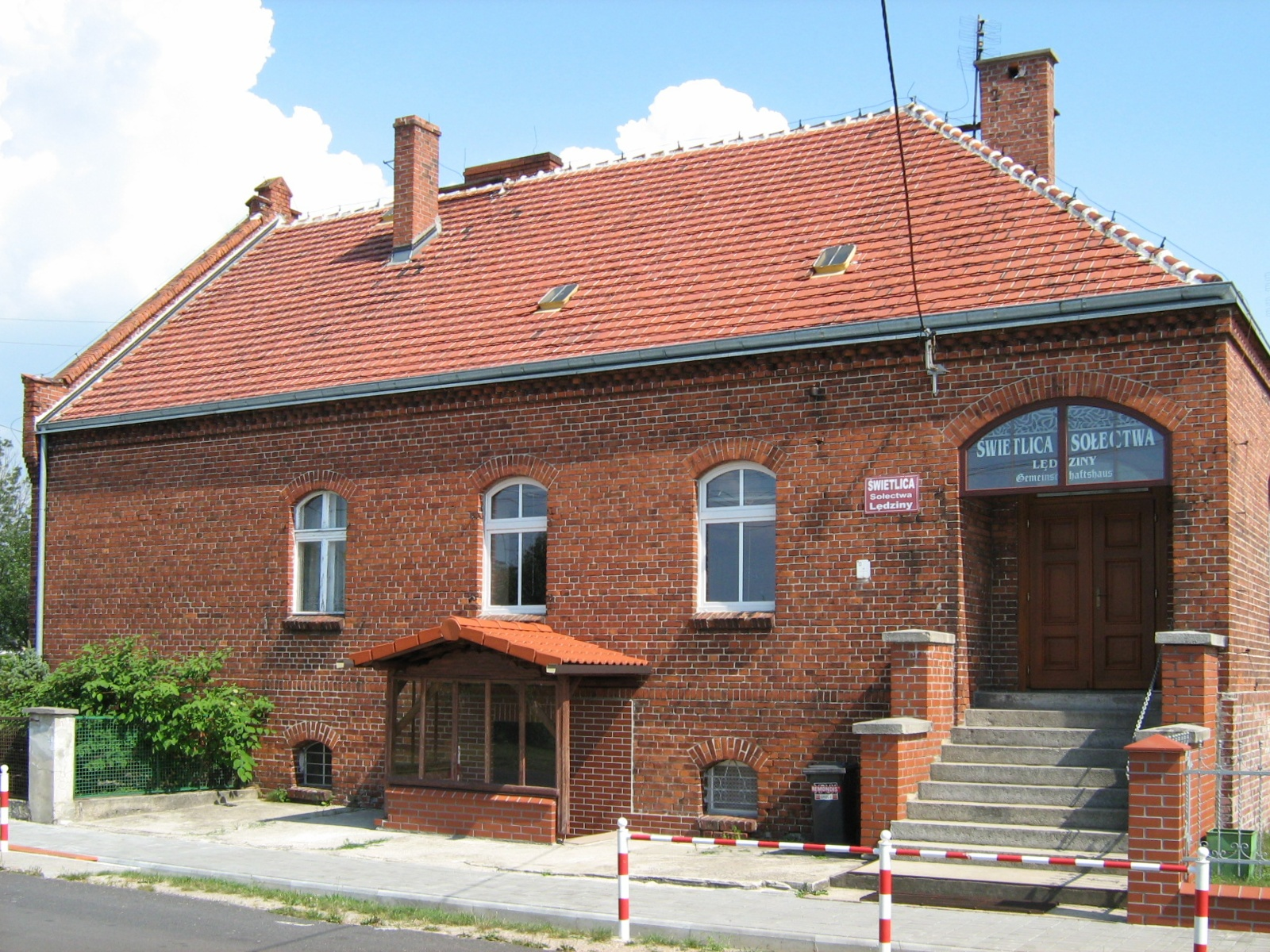

- Location within Poland
- Coordinates: 50°40′N 18°1′E
- Country: Poland
- Voivodeship: Opole
- County: Opole
- Gmina: Chrząstowice

Lędziny [lɛɲˈd͡ʑinɨ] is a village in the administrative district of Gmina Chrząstowice, within Opole County, Opole Voivodeship, in south-western Poland.
