= Antoniów, Opole Voivodeship =

Antoniów
- Village
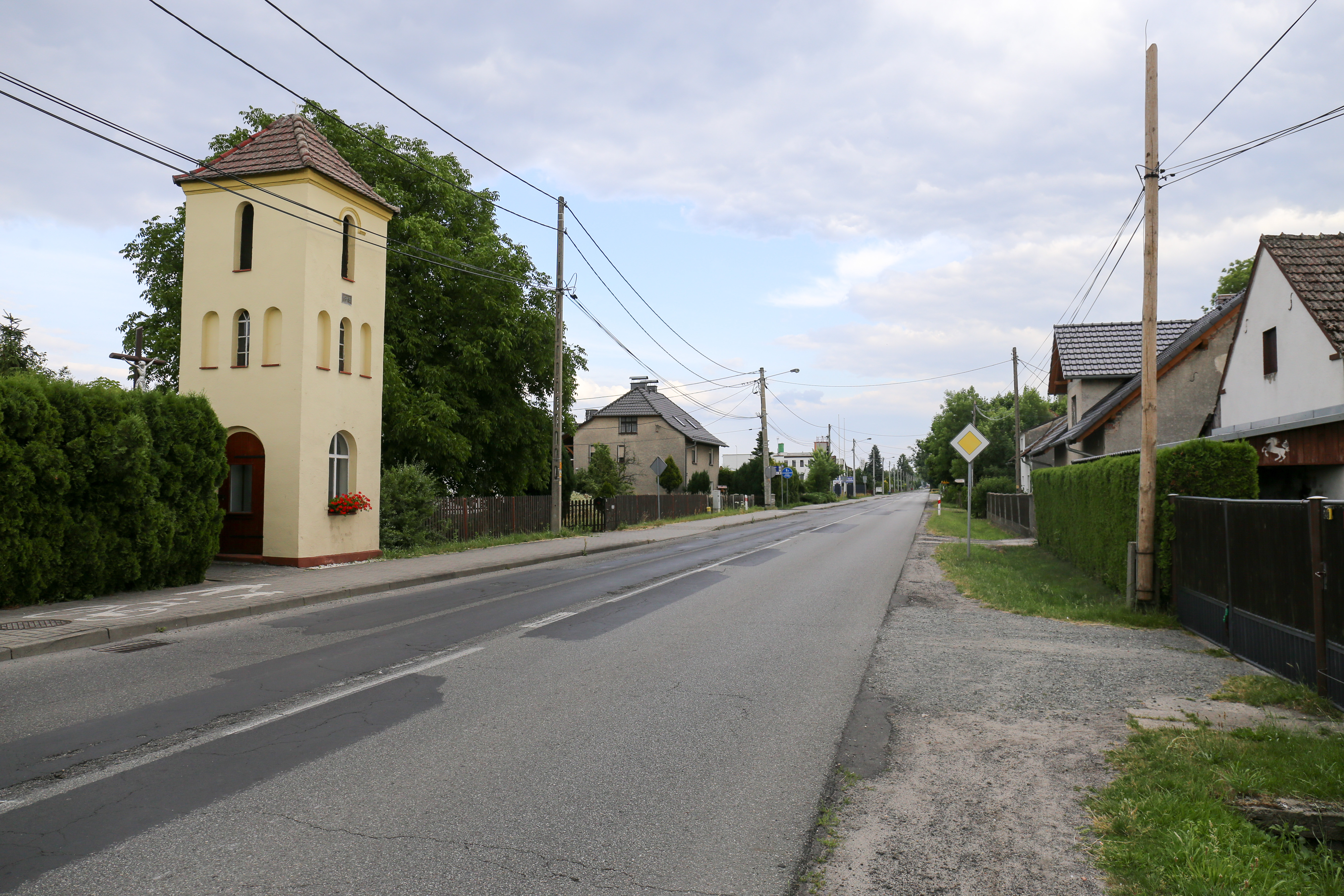

- Location within Poland
- Coordinates: 50°41′N 18°11′E
- Country: Poland
- Voivodeship: Opole
- County: Opole
- Gmina: Ozimek
- Population: 1,227

Antoniów [anˈtɔɲuf] (German: Antonia) is a village in the administrative district of Gmina Ozimek, within Opole County, Opole Voivodeship, in south-western Poland.
