= Borki, Opole Voivodeship =

Borki
- Village
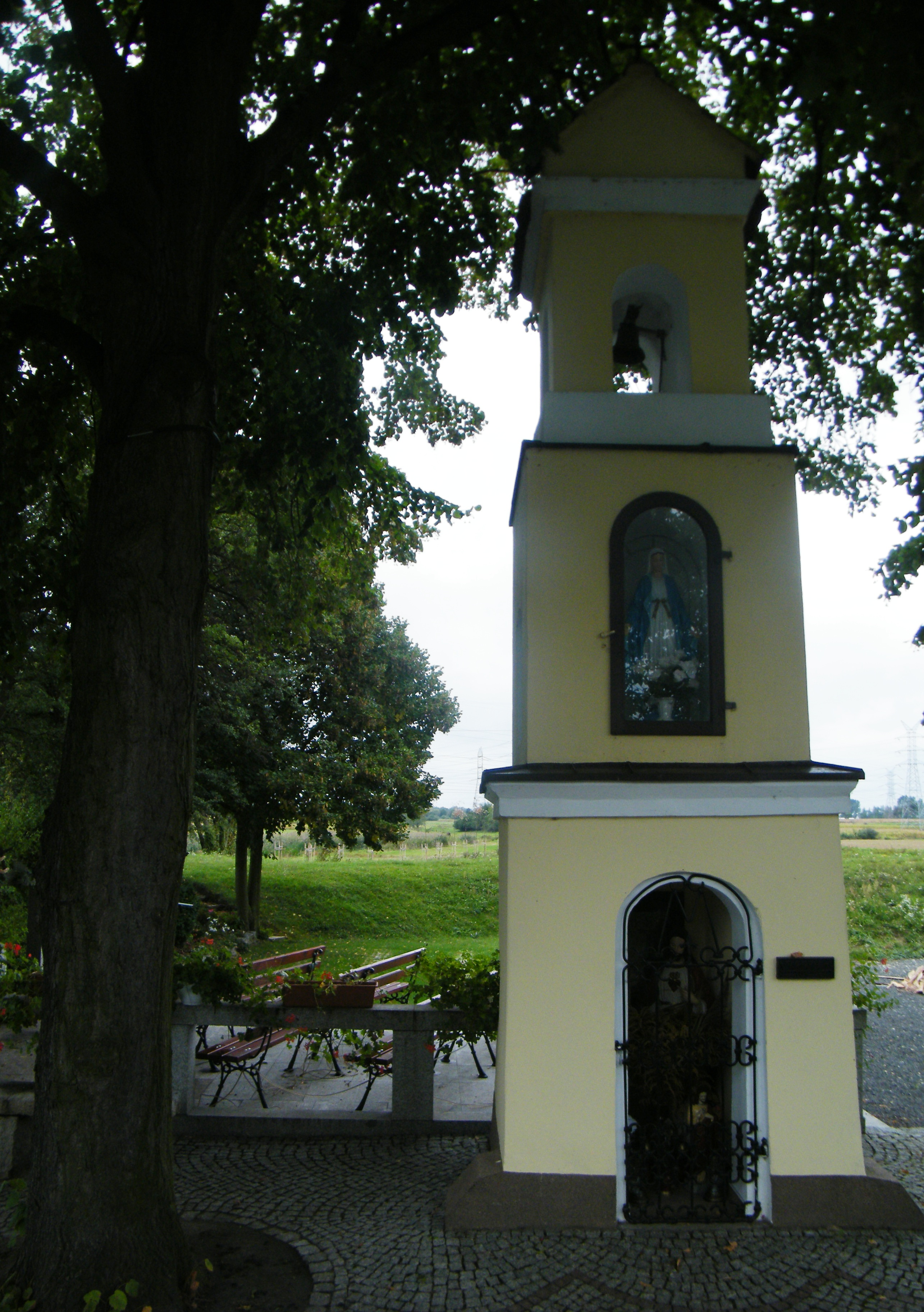
- Chapel

- Location within Poland
- Coordinates: 50°44′17″N 17°52′45″E
- Country: Poland
- Voivodeship: Opole
- County: Opole
- Gmina: Dobrzeń Wielki

Borki [ˈbɔrki] (German Borrek) is a village in the administrative district of Gmina Dobrzeń Wielki, within Opole County, Opole Voivodeship, in south-western Poland.
