= Świerkle =

- Village
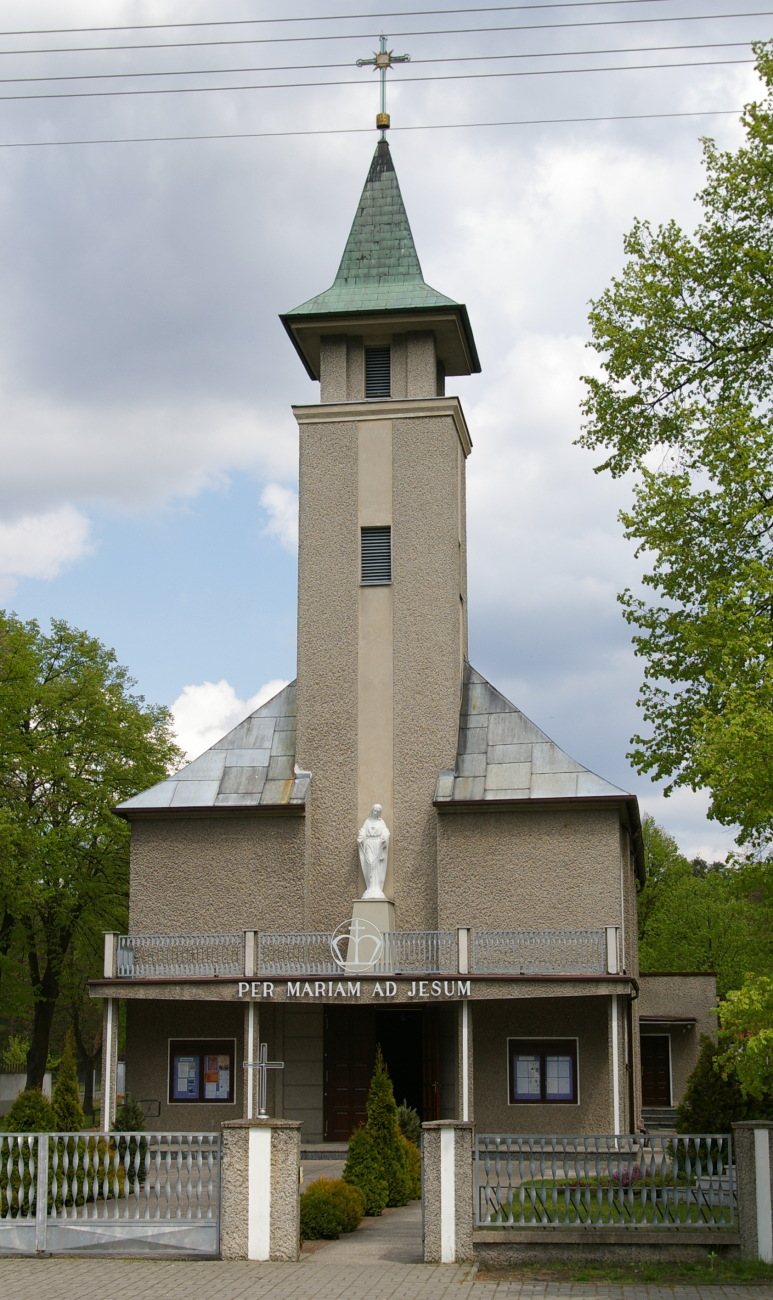
- Immaculate Heart of the Virgin Mary Church

- Location within Poland
- Coordinates: 50°45′50″N 17°55′52″E
- Country: Poland
- Voivodeship: Opole
- County: Opole
- Gmina: Dobrzeń Wielki

Świerkle (Polish: [ˈɕfjɛrklɛ]) is a village in the administrative district of Gmina Dobrzeń Wielki, within Opole County, Opole Voivodeship, in south-western Poland.
