= Mańczok =

- Village
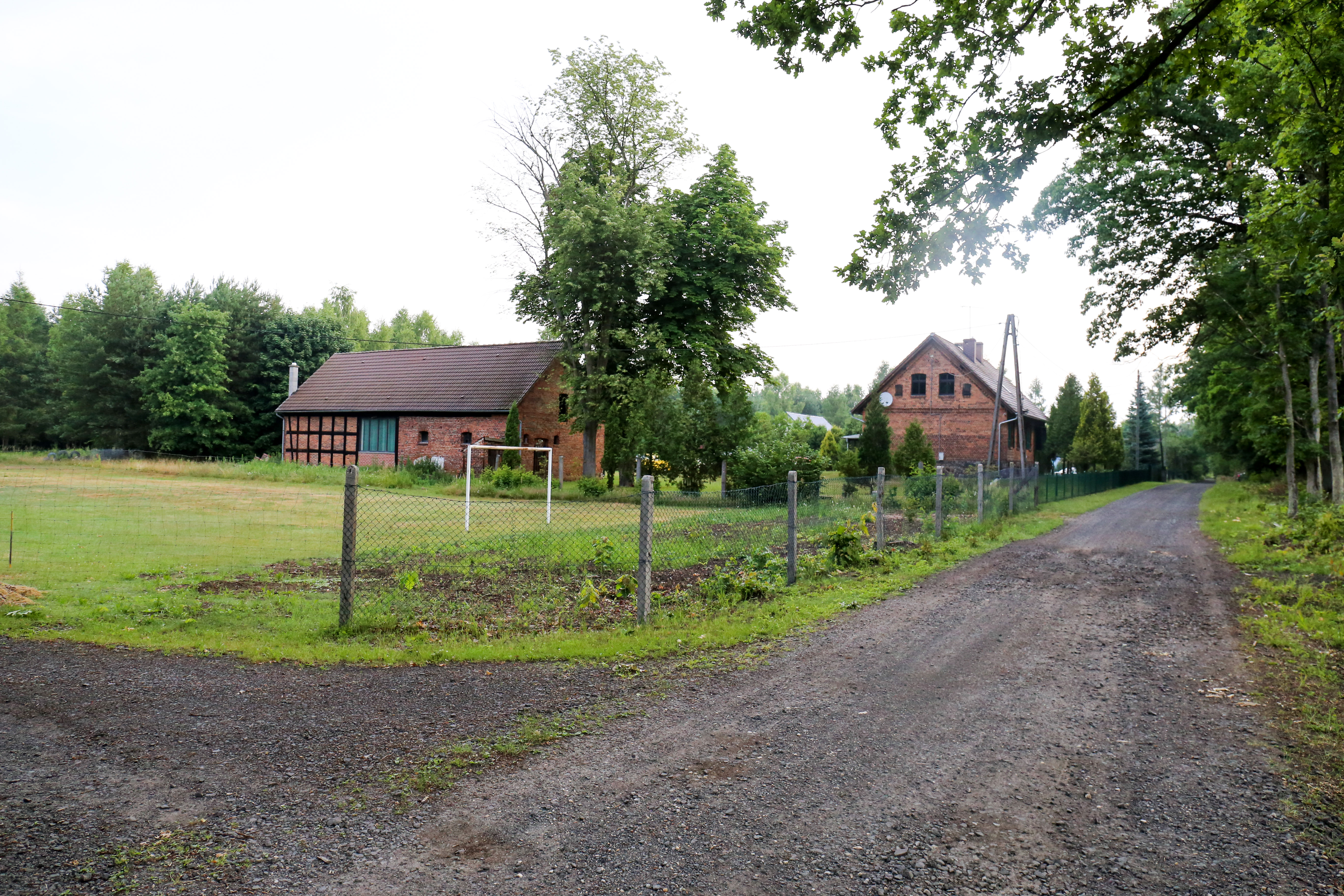

- Location within Poland
- Coordinates: 50°49′53″N 17°59′27″E
- Country: Poland
- Voivodeship: Opole
- County: Opole
- Gmina: Murów
- Population: 4

Mańczok ([ˈmaɲt͡ʂɔk]) is a village in the administrative district of Gmina Murów, within Opole County, Opole Voivodeship, in south-western Poland.
