= Krzyżowa Dolina =

- Village
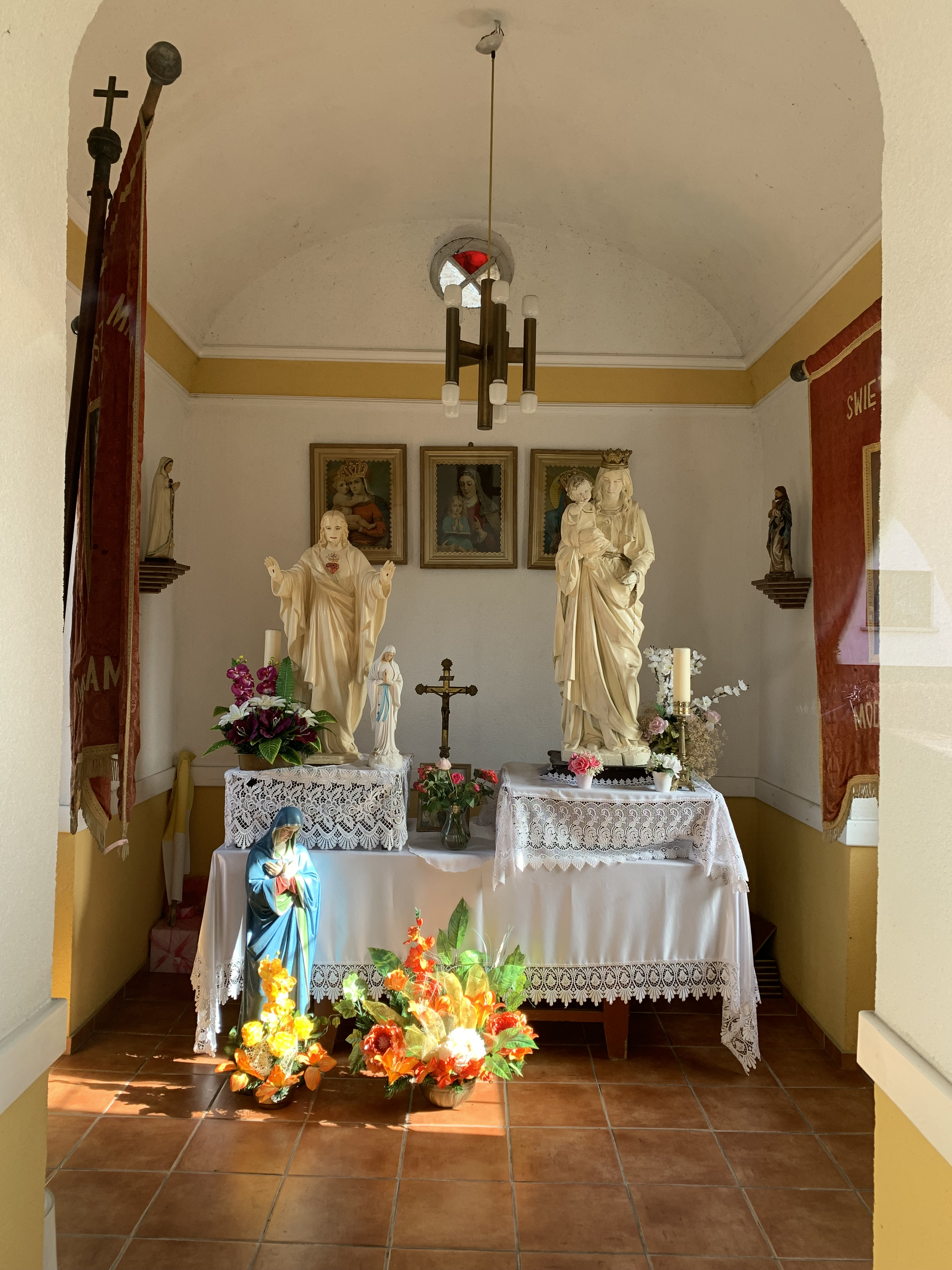
- Chapel

- Location within Poland
- Coordinates: 50°39′1″N 18°13′17″E
- Country: Poland
- Voivodeship: Opole
- County: Opole
- Gmina: Ozimek
- Time zone: UTC+1 (CET)
  - Summer (DST): UTC+2 (CEST)
- Vehicle registration: OPO

Krzyżowa Dolina [kʂɨˈʐɔva dɔˈlina] (German: Kreuzthal) is a village in the administrative district of Gmina Ozimek, within Opole County, Opole Voivodeship, in southern Poland.

The name of the village is of Polish origin and comes from the word krzyż, which means "cross". It translates to "cross valley".
