= Suchy Bór =

Suchy Bór Derschau
- Village
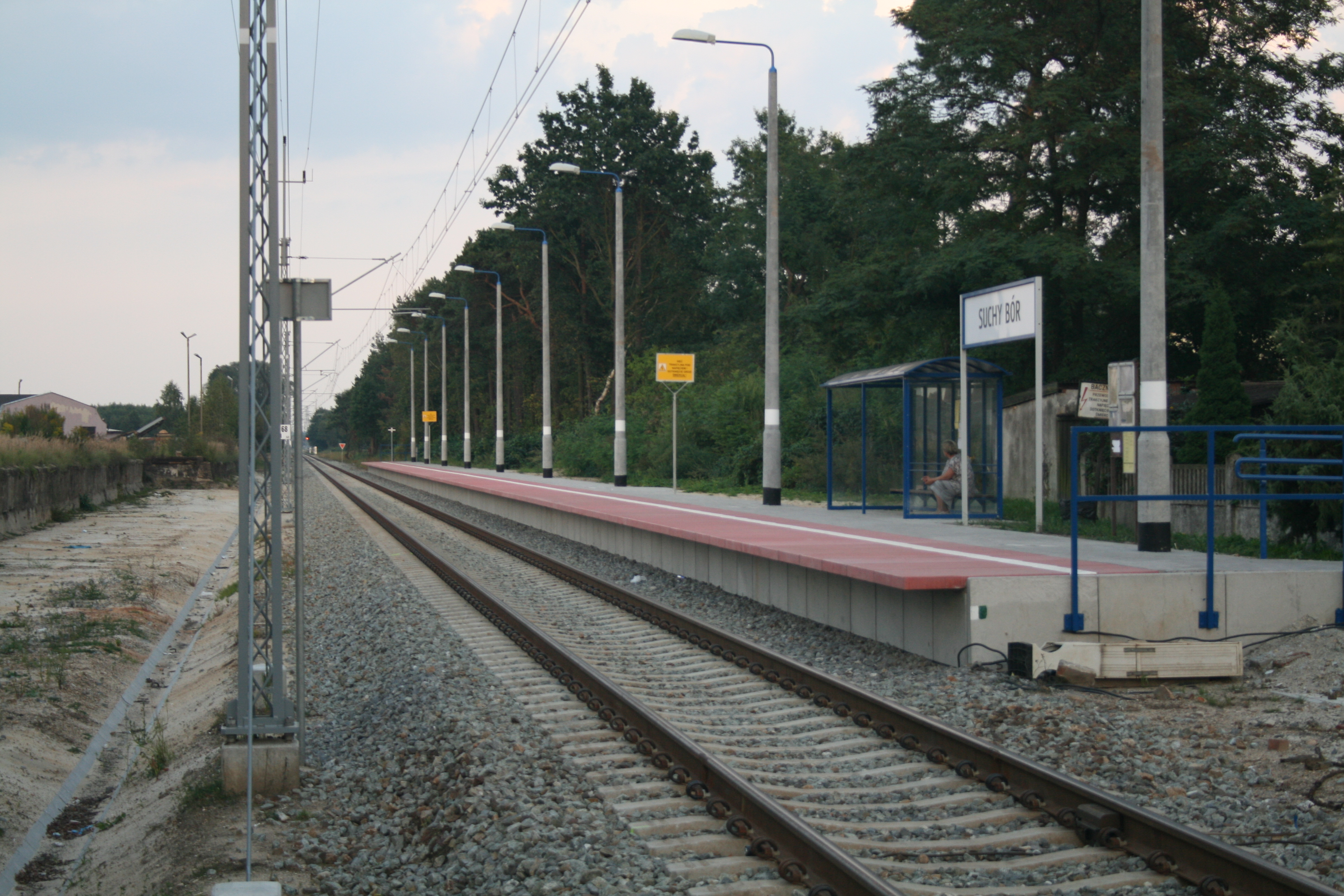
- Train station in Suchy Bór

- Location within Poland
- Coordinates: 50°39′N 18°2′E
- Country: Poland
- Voivodeship: Opole
- County: Opole
- Gmina: Chrząstowice
- Time zone: UTC+1 (CET)
  - Summer (DST): UTC+2 (CEST)
- Vehicle registration: OPO

Suchy Bór (Polish: [ˈsuxɨ ˈbur]) is a village in the administrative district of Gmina Chrząstowice, within Opole County, Opole Voivodeship, in southern Poland.

== History ==
In the 10th century the area became part of the emerging Polish state, and later on, it was part of Poland, Bohemia (Czechia), Prussia, and Germany. During World War II, the Germans operated the E428 forced labour subcamp of the Stalag VIII-B/344 prisoner-of-war camp at the local sawmill. After the defeat of Germany in the war, in 1945, the region became again part of Poland.

== Transport ==
There is a train station in the village.
