= Dąbrowice, Opole Voivodeship =

Dąbrowice Dombrowitz
- Village
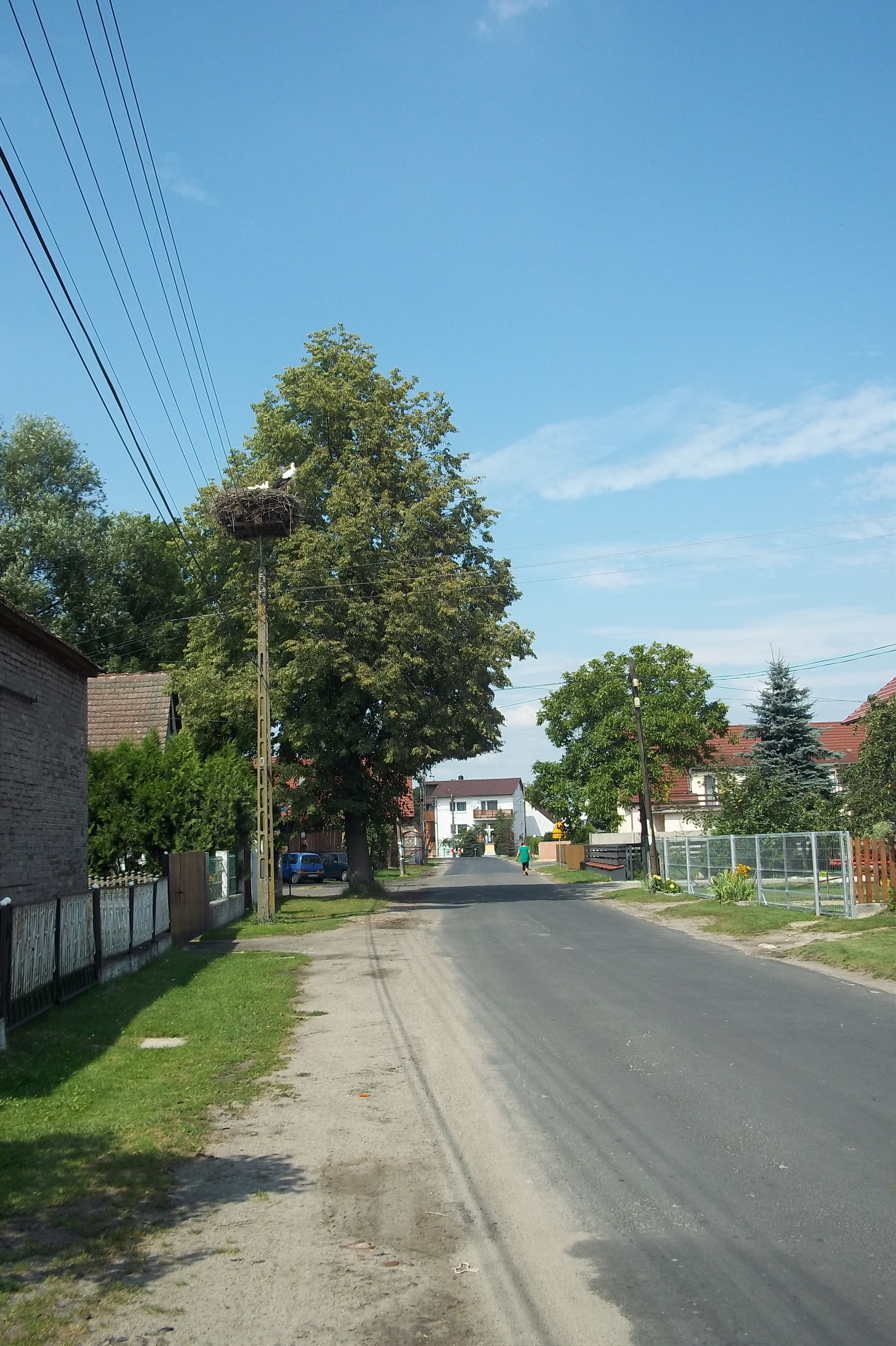

- Location within Poland
- Coordinates: 50°38′N 18°5′E
- Country: Poland
- Voivodeship: Opole
- County: Opole
- Gmina: Chrząstowice
- Time zone: UTC+1 (CET)
  - Summer (DST): UTC+2 (CEST)
- Vehicle registration: OPO

Dąbrowice [dɔmbrɔˈvit͡sɛ] (German: Dombrowitz) is a village in the administrative district of Gmina Chrząstowice, within Opole County, Opole Voivodeship, in south-western Poland.

== History ==
The village was first mentioned in 1297, when it was part of fragmented Piast-ruled Poland. In 1526 the area came under the control of the Habsburg Empire. In 1566 the name was recorded as Dumbrowicz. After the War of the Austrian Succession, Silesia was taken by the Kingdom of Prussia. After the unification of Germany, the village was located in the Landkreis Oppeln in the Upper Silesia Province.

In the Upper Silesia plebiscite on March 20, 1921, 134 people voted to remain in Germany and 45 to rejoin Poland. Consequently, Dombrowitz remained with Germany. In 1933 Dombrowitz had 233 inhabitants.

From 1935 the Nazi government made a large-scale effort to rename places with Slavic-origin names. On 15 June 1936 the town was renamed Eichgrund O.S. In 1939 the town had 294 inhabitants.

After 1945 the village passed to Poland and much of German population was expelled in accordance with the Potsdam Agreement; it was renamed Dąbrowie, and later this name was changed to Dąbrowice. In 1950 the village was added to Opole Voivodeship and in 1999 Opole County was reconstituted. On 20 January 2006 the town was officially made bilingual in Polish and German, and in May its German name was made official alongside the Polish Dąbrowice.
