= Chróścice =

- Village
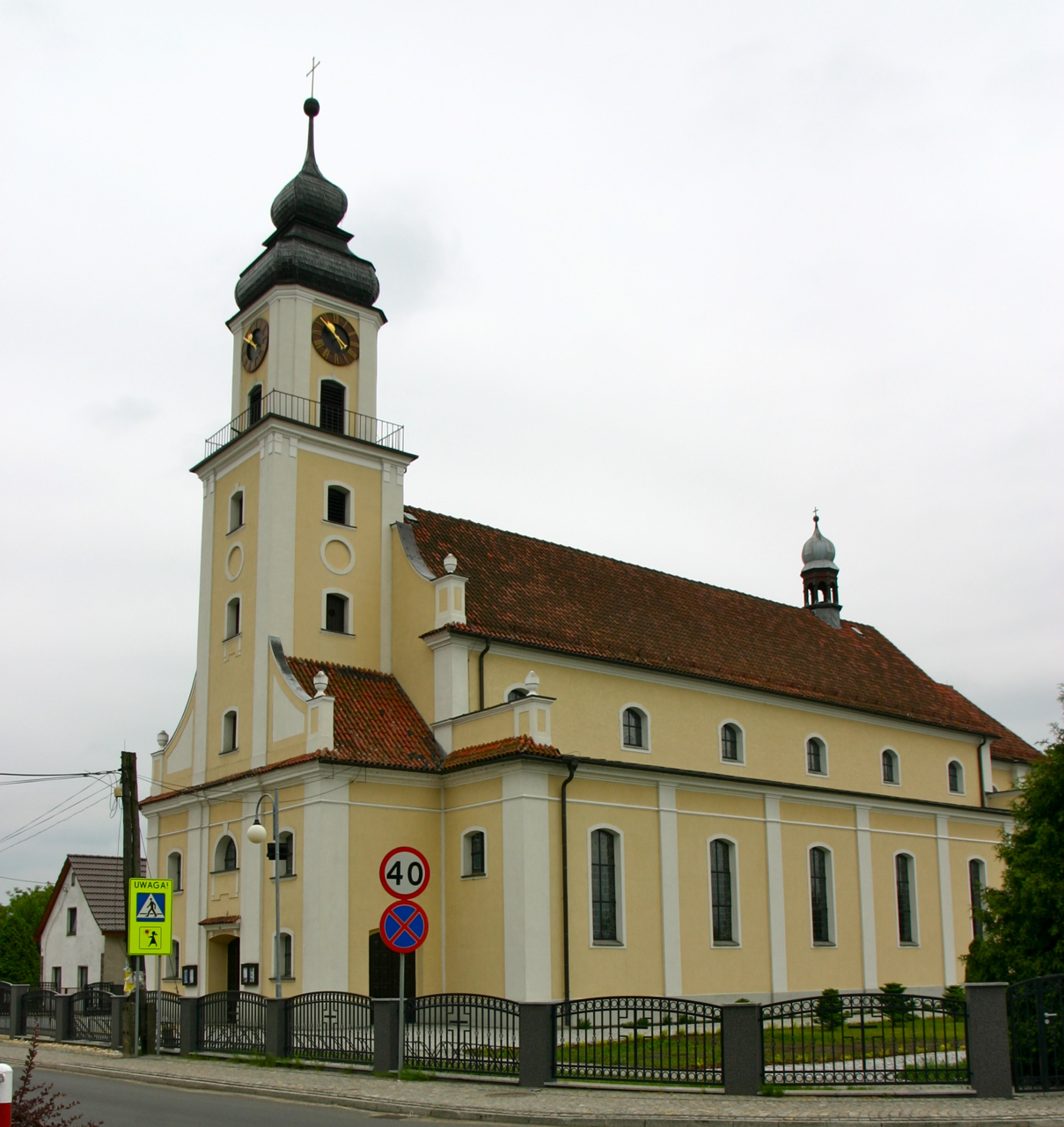
- Saint Jadwiga Church

- Location within Poland
- Coordinates: 50°46′41″N 17°48′46″E
- Country: Poland
- Voivodeship: Opole
- County: Opole
- Gmina: Dobrzeń Wielki
- Population: 3,000
- Website: https://web.archive.org/web/20080703160102/http://www.chroscice.eu/

Chróścice [xruɕˈt͡ɕit͡sɛ] is a village in the administrative district of Gmina Dobrzeń Wielki, within Opole County, Opole Voivodeship, in south-western Poland.
