= Dobrzeń Mały =

Dobrzeń Mały Klein Döbern
- Village
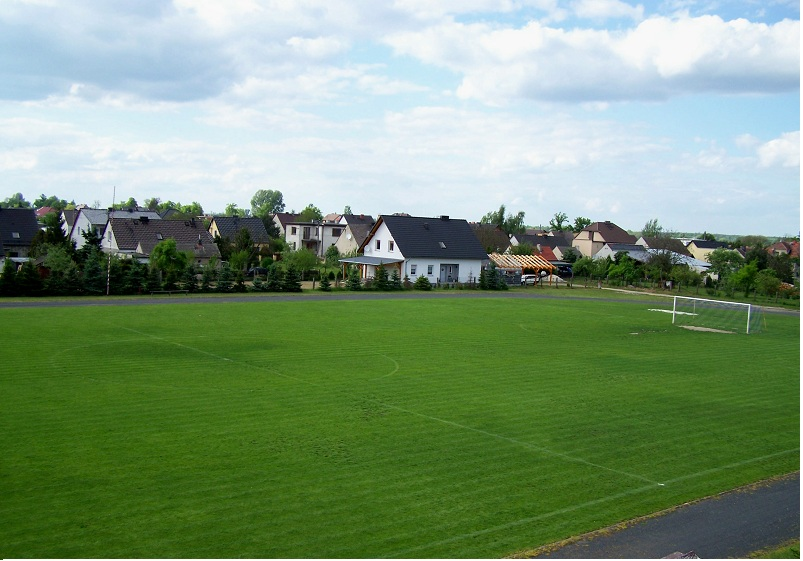

- Location within Poland
- Coordinates: 50°45′N 17°52′E
- Country: Poland
- Voivodeship: Opole
- County: Opole
- Gmina: Dobrzeń Wielki
- Population: 750

Dobrzeń Mały (Polish pronunciation: [ˈdɔbʐɛj̃ ˈmawɨ]) is a village in the administrative district of Gmina Dobrzeń Wielki, within Opole County, Opole Voivodeship, in south-western Poland.

== History ==
In the Upper Silesia plebiscite held on March 20, 1921, 321 eligible voters in Klein Döbern voted to remain with Germany and 188 voted for Poland. It therefore remained within the German Reich until 1945. In 1925, there were 818 inhabitants. Until 1945 it was part of the Oppeln district in the Prussian Province of Upper Silesia.

In 1945, it came under Polish administration and was renamed Dobrzeń Mały. On 22 April 2009, German was introduced as the second official language in Gmina Dobrzeń Wielki, to which Klein Döbern belongs, and on 1 December 2009, the place was also given the official German place name Klein Döbern .
