= Swieciny =

Swieciny may refer to:

- Świeciny, Łódź Voivodeship, Poland
- Święciny, Opole Voivodeship, Poland
