= Nowa Schodnia =

- Village
- Location within Poland
- Coordinates: 50°40′N 18°12′E
- Country: Poland
- Voivodeship: Opole
- County: Opole
- Gmina: Ozimek

Nowa Schodnia [ˈnɔva ˈsxɔdɲa] (German: Neu Schodnia) is a village in the administrative district of Gmina Ozimek, within Opole County, Opole Voivodeship, in south-western Poland.
