= Grabice, Opole Voivodeship =

Grabice
- Village
- Location within Poland
- Coordinates: 50°54′24″N 17°58′58″E
- Country: Poland
- Voivodeship: Opole
- County: Opole
- Gmina: Murów
- Time zone: UTC+1 (CET)
  - Summer (DST): UTC+2 (CEST)
- Vehicle registration: OPO

Grabice [ɡraˈbit͡sɛ] (German: Zedlitz) is a village in the administrative district of Gmina Murów, within Opole County, Opole Voivodeship, in south-western Poland.
