= Grabczok =

- Village
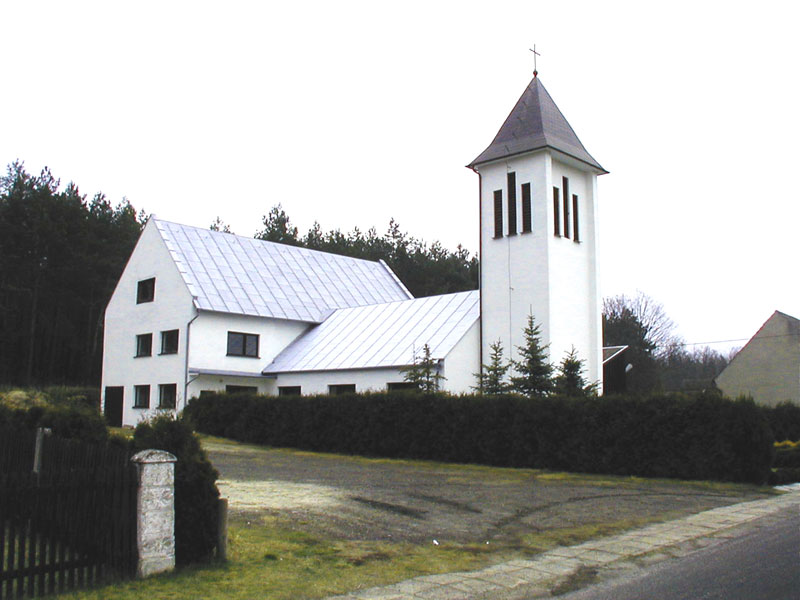
- Catholic church

- Location within Poland
- Coordinates: 50°50′31″N 17°56′02″E
- Country: Poland
- Voivodeship: Opole
- County: Opole
- Gmina: Murów

Grabczok [ˈɡrapt͡ʂɔk] is a village in the administrative district of Gmina Murów, within Opole County, Opole Voivodeship, in south-western Poland.
