= Młodnik =

- Village
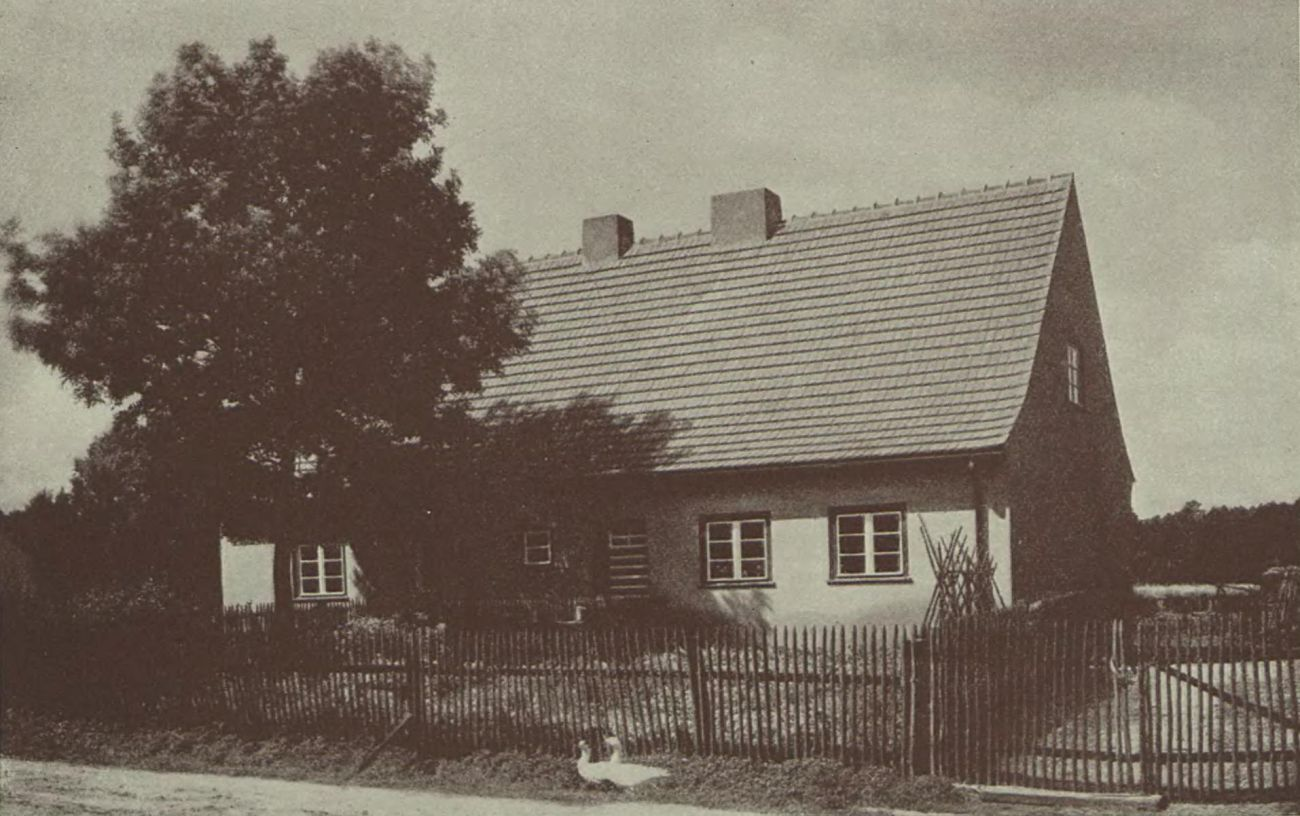

- Location within Poland
- Coordinates: 50°55′16″N 18°02′12″E
- Country: Poland
- Voivodeship: Opole
- County: Opole
- Gmina: Murów

Młodnik [ˈmwɔdnik] is a village in the administrative district of Gmina Murów, within Opole County, Opole Voivodeship, in south-western Poland.
