= Dylaki =

- Village
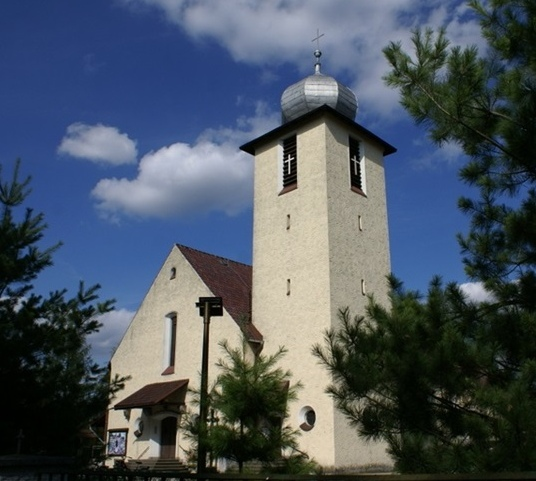
- Catholic church

- Location within Poland
- Coordinates: 50°44′N 18°11′E
- Country: Poland
- Voivodeship: Opole
- County: Opole
- Gmina: Ozimek

Dylaki [dɨˈlaki] (German: Dyloken) is a village in the administrative district of Gmina Ozimek, within Opole County, Opole Voivodeship, in south-western Poland.
