= Brzezie, Opole Voivodeship =

Brzezie
- Village
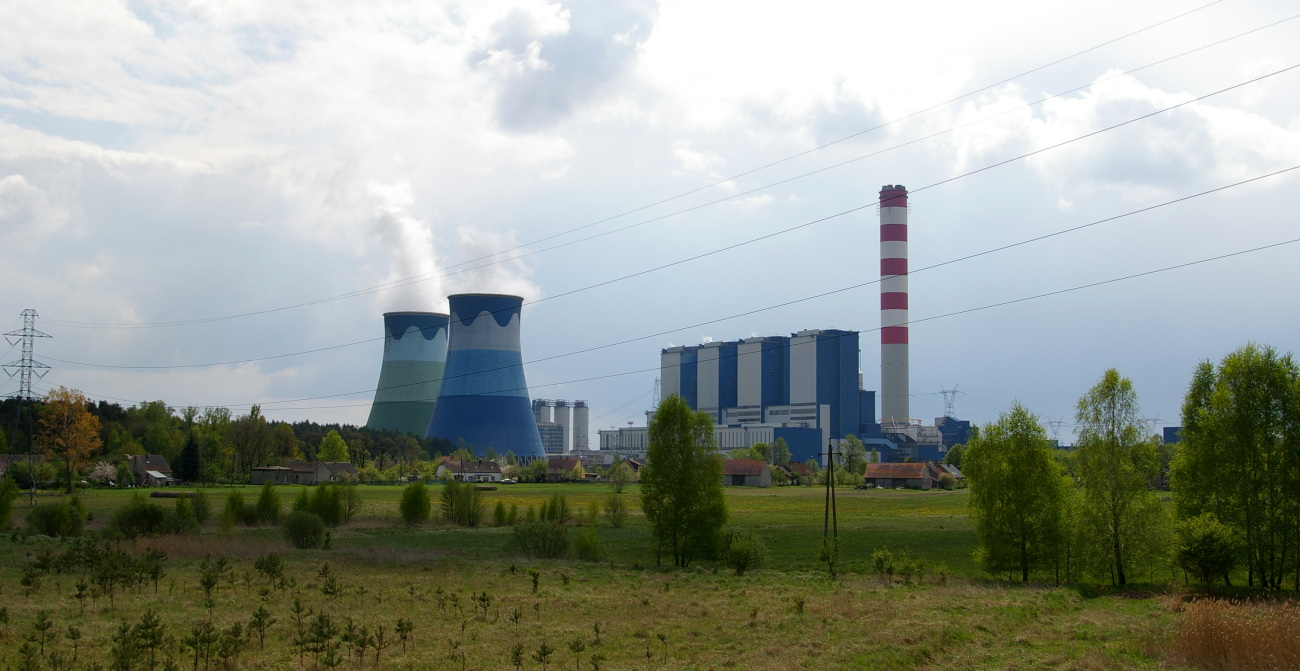
- Power station

- Location within Poland
- Coordinates: 50°46′N 17°54′E
- Country: Poland
- Voivodeship: Opole
- County: Opole
- Gmina: Dobrzeń Wielki
- Population: 250
- Website: http://www.brzezie.art.pl

Brzezie [ˈbʐɛʑɛ] is a village in the administrative district of Gmina Dobrzeń Wielki, within Opole County, Opole Voivodeship, in south-western Poland.
