= Dębiniec, Opole Voivodeship =

Dębiniec
- Village
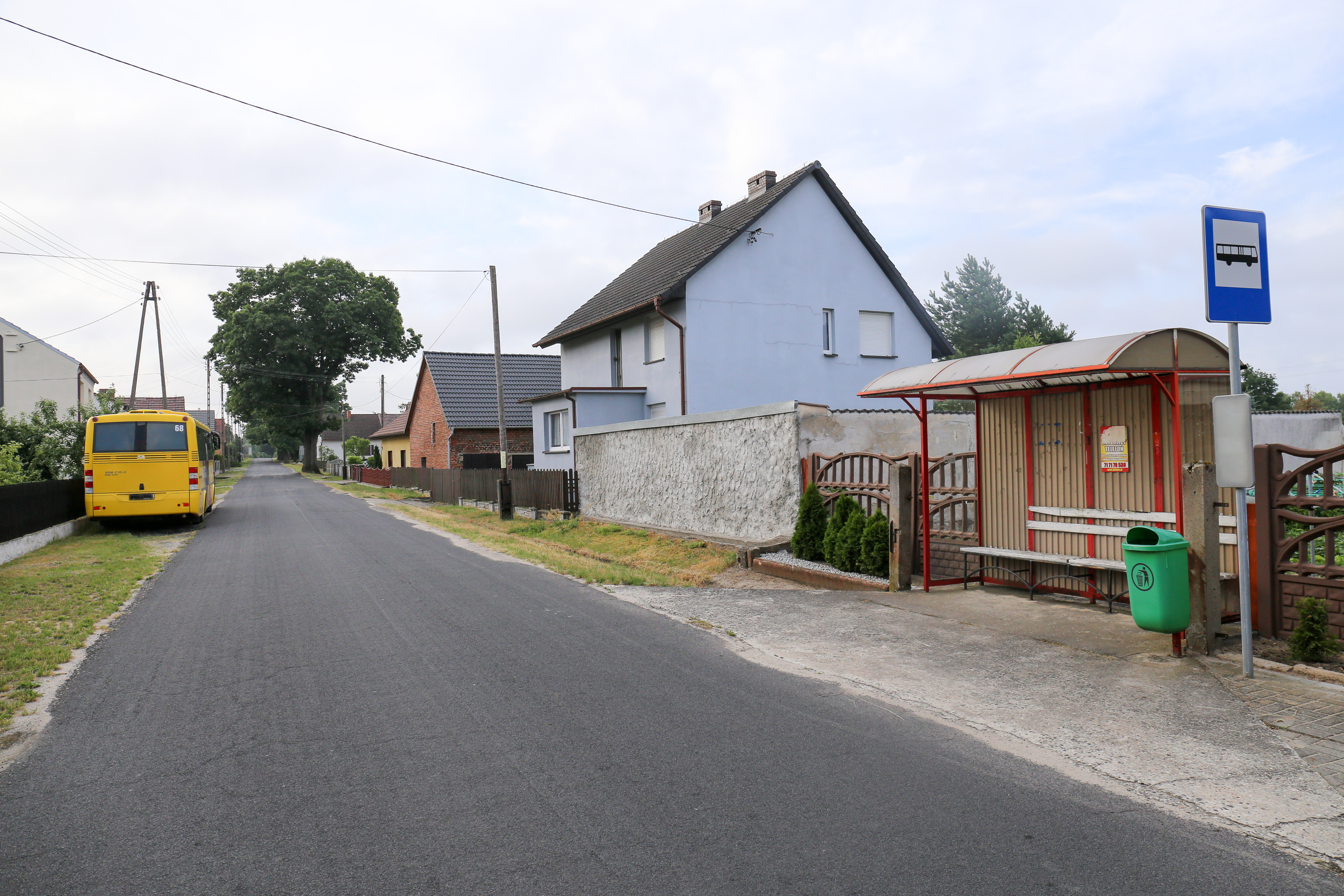

- Location within Poland
- Coordinates: 50°52′49″N 18°04′22″E
- Country: Poland
- Voivodeship: Opole
- County: Opole
- Gmina: Murów

Dębiniec [dɛmˈbiɲɛt͡s] is a village in the administrative district of Gmina Murów, within Opole County, Opole Voivodeship, in south-western Poland.
