= Falmirowice =

- Village
- Location within Poland
- Coordinates: 50°37′N 18°3′E
- Country: Poland
- Voivodeship: Opole
- County: Opole
- Gmina: Chrząstowice

Falmirowice [falmirɔˈvit͡sɛ] is a village in the administrative district of Gmina Chrząstowice, within Opole County, Opole Voivodeship, in south-western Poland.
