= Biestrzynnik =

- Village
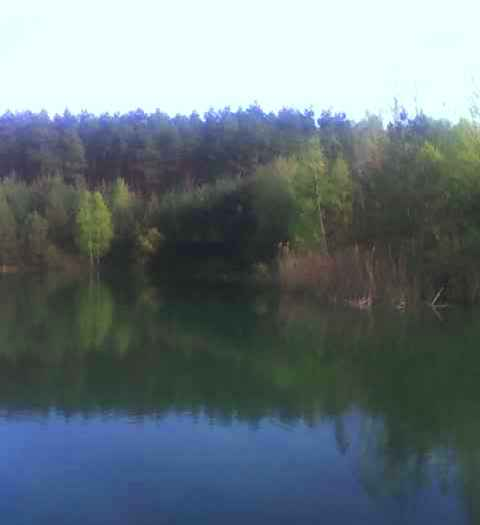
- Lake

- Location within Poland
- Coordinates: 50°44′N 18°12′E
- Country: Poland
- Voivodeship: Opole
- County: Opole
- Gmina: Ozimek

Biestrzynnik [bjɛsˈtʂɨnnik] (German: Biestrzinnik) is a village in the administrative district of Gmina Ozimek, within Opole County, Opole Voivodeship, in south-western Poland.
