= Pustków, Opole Voivodeship =

Pustków
- Village
- Location within Poland
- Coordinates: 50°41′19″N 18°10′31″E
- Country: Poland
- Voivodeship: Opole
- County: Opole
- Gmina: Ozimek
- Population: 500

Pustków [ˈpustkuf] (German: Pustkow) is a village in the administrative district of Gmina Ozimek, within Opole County, Opole Voivodeship, in south-western Poland.
