= Radomierowice =

- Village
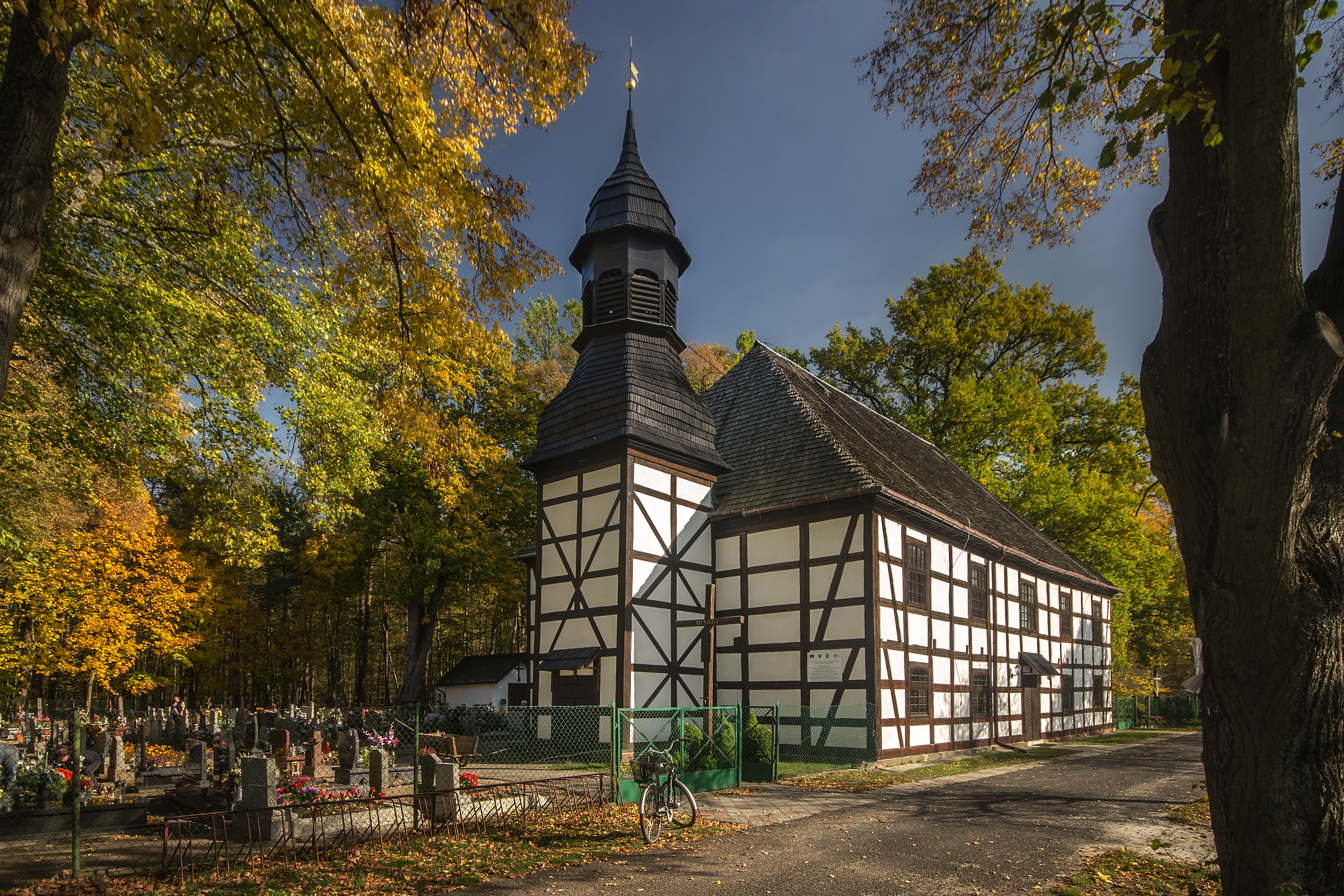
- Catholic church

- Location within Poland
- Coordinates: 50°56′N 18°2′E
- Country: Poland
- Voivodeship: Opole
- County: Opole
- Gmina: Murów

Radomierowice [radɔmjɛrɔˈvit͡sɛ] is a village in the administrative district of Gmina Murów, within Opole County, Opole Voivodeship, in south-western Poland.

== Notable residents ==
- Erich Pietzonka (1906-1989), Fallschirmjäger officer
