= Wojszyn, Opole Voivodeship =

Wojszyn
- Village
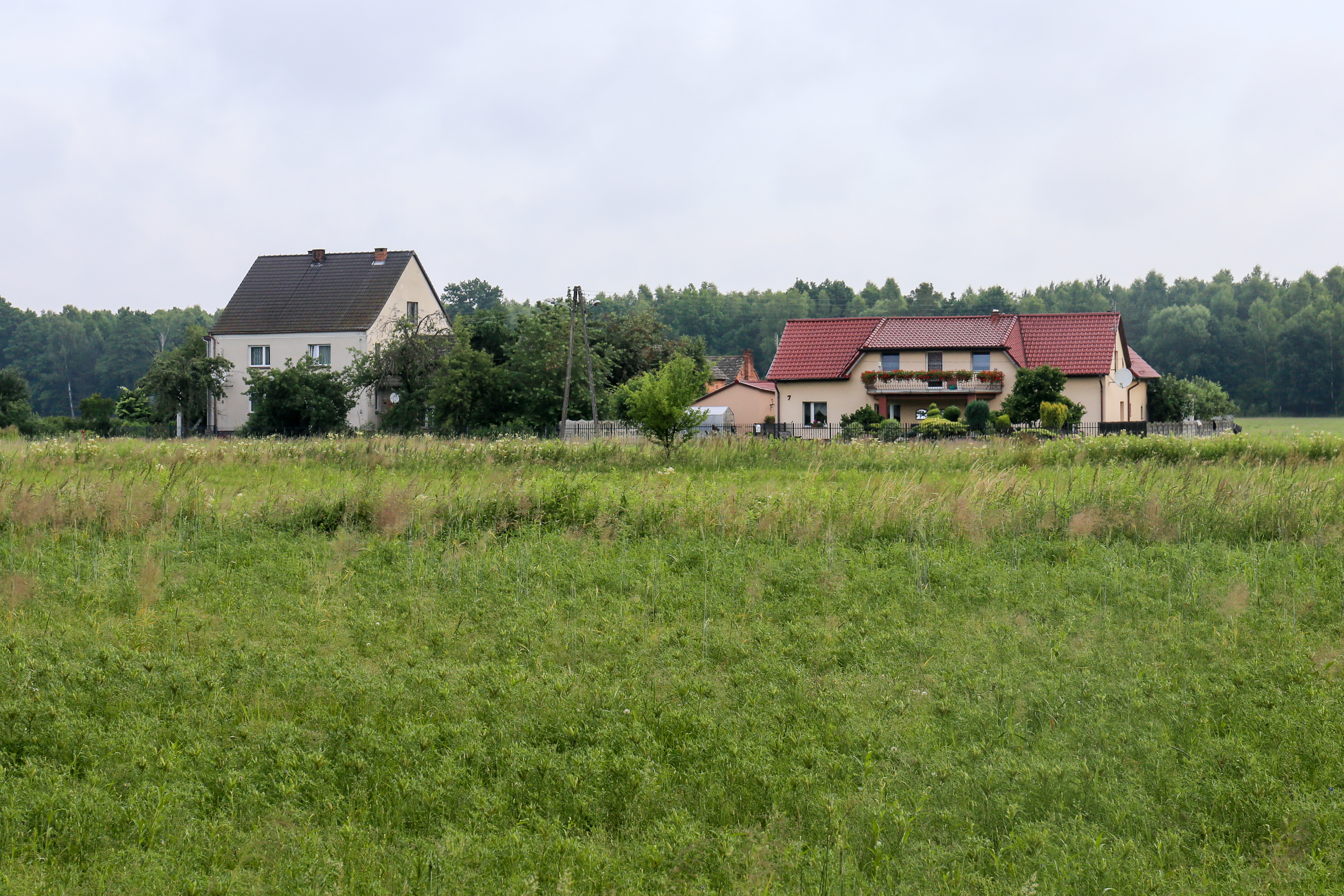

- Location within Poland
- Coordinates: 50°52′23″N 18°00′45″E
- Country: Poland
- Voivodeship: Opole
- County: Opole
- Gmina: Murów
- Population: 55

Wojszyn [ˈvɔi̯ʂɨn] is a village in the administrative district of Gmina Murów, within Opole County, Opole Voivodeship, in south-western Poland.
