= Stare Budkowice =

- Village
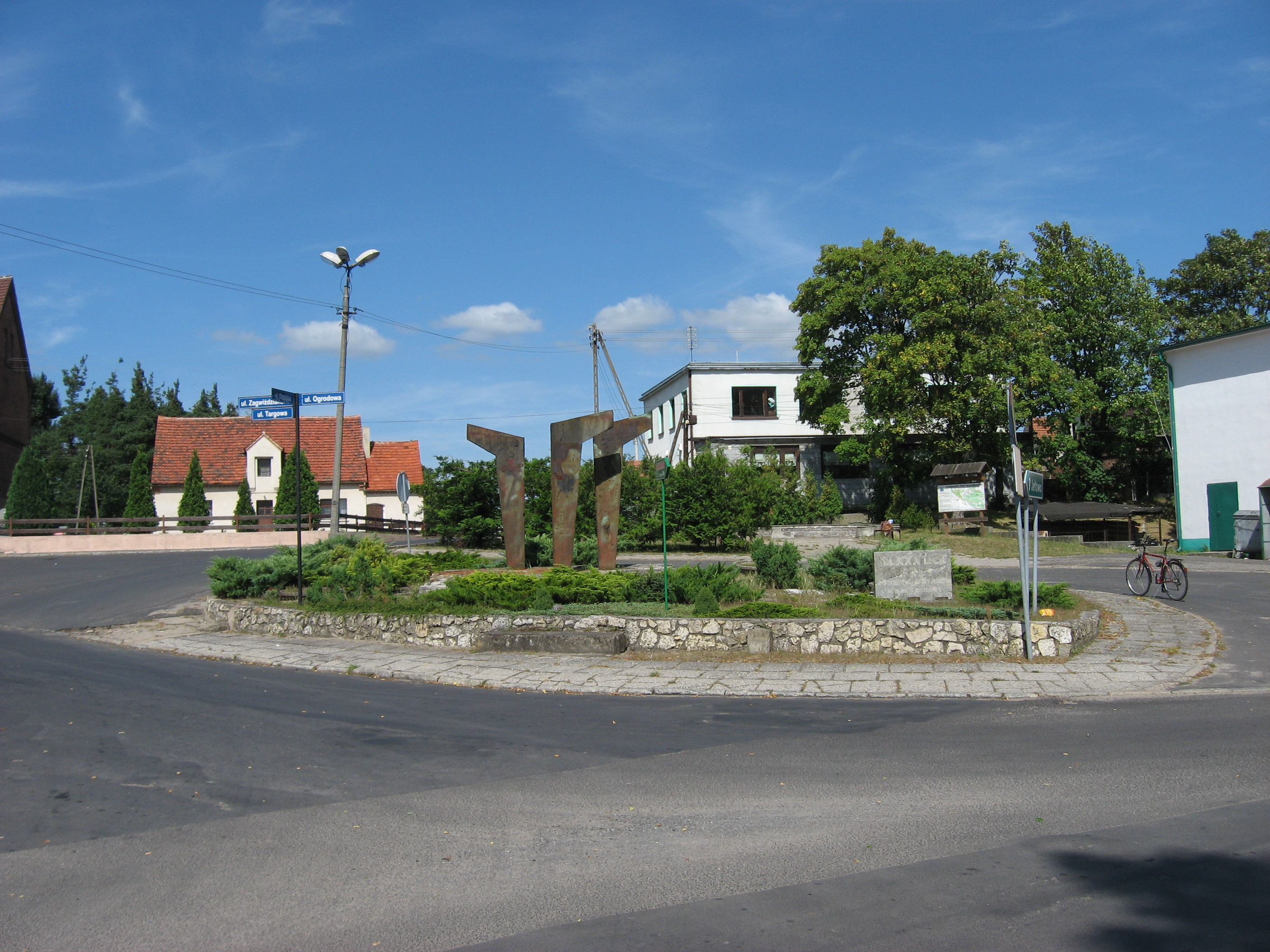

- Location within Poland
- Coordinates: 50°52′N 18°4′E
- Country: Poland
- Voivodeship: Opole
- County: Opole
- Gmina: Murów

Stare Budkowice [ˈstarɛ butkɔˈvit͡sɛ] is a village in the administrative district of Gmina Murów, within Opole County, Opole Voivodeship, in south-western Poland.
