= Kęszyce, Opole Voivodeship =

Kęszyce
- Village
- Location within Poland
- Coordinates: 50°53′49″N 18°00′50″E
- Country: Poland
- Voivodeship: Opole
- County: Opole
- Gmina: Murów
- Population: 4

Kęszyce [kɛ̃ˈʂɨt͡sɛ] is a village in the administrative district of Gmina Murów, within Opole County, Opole Voivodeship, in south-western Poland.
