= Kały, Opole Voivodeship =

Kały
- Village
- Location within Poland
- Coordinates: 50°49′58″N 18°04′34″E
- Country: Poland
- Voivodeship: Opole
- County: Opole
- Gmina: Murów

Kały [ˈkawɨ] (German: Podewils) is a village in the administrative district of Gmina Murów, within Opole County, Opole Voivodeship, in south-western Poland.
