= Nowe Budkowice =

- Village
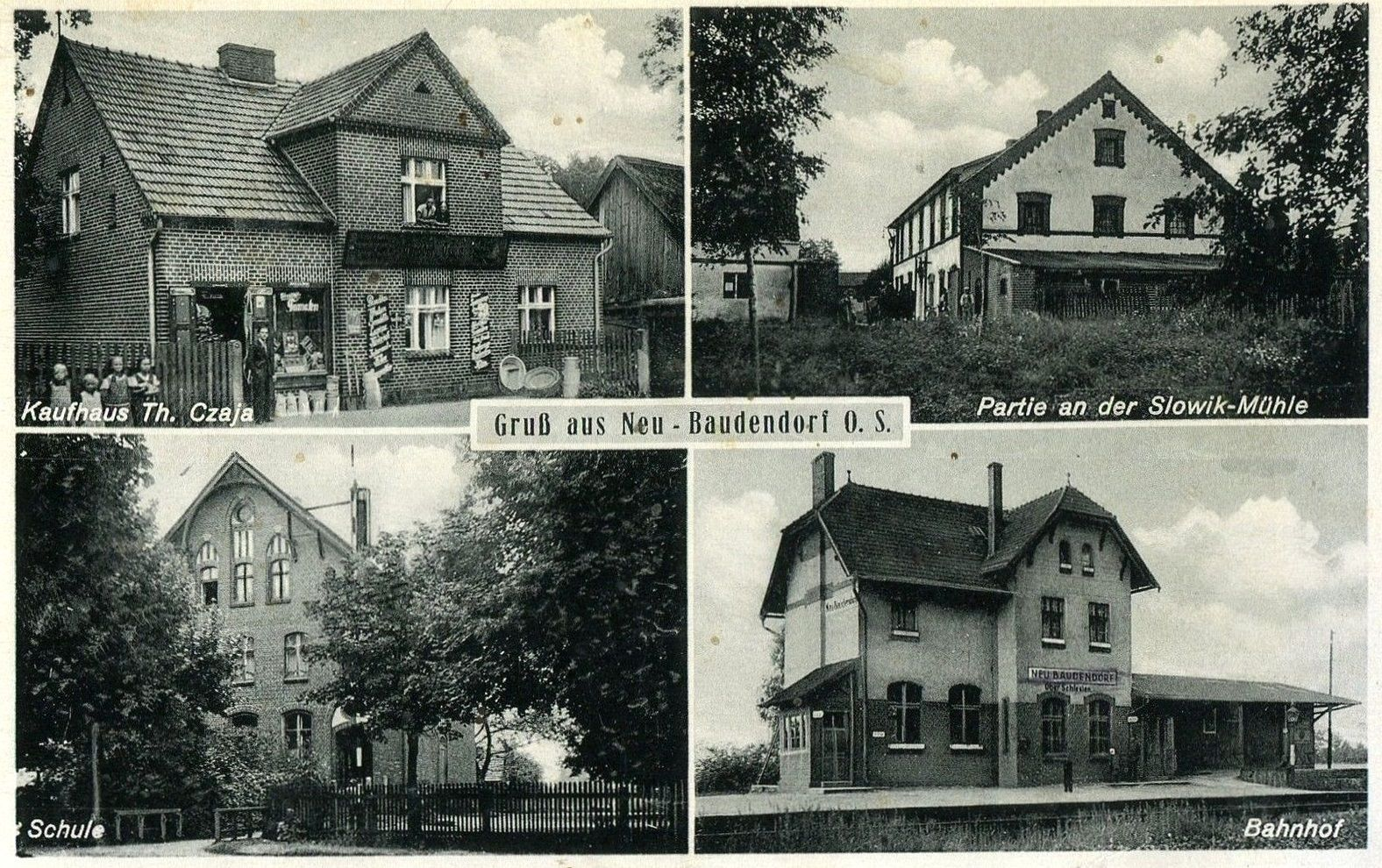
- 1936 postcard

- Location within Poland
- Coordinates: 50°51′28″N 18°04′30″E
- Country: Poland
- Voivodeship: Opole
- County: Opole
- Gmina: Murów
- Elevation: 110 m (360 ft)

Nowe Budkowice [ˈnɔvɛ butkɔˈvit͡sɛ] is a village in the administrative district of Gmina Murów, within Opole County, Opole Voivodeship, in south-western Poland.
