= Kup, Poland =

Kup
- Village
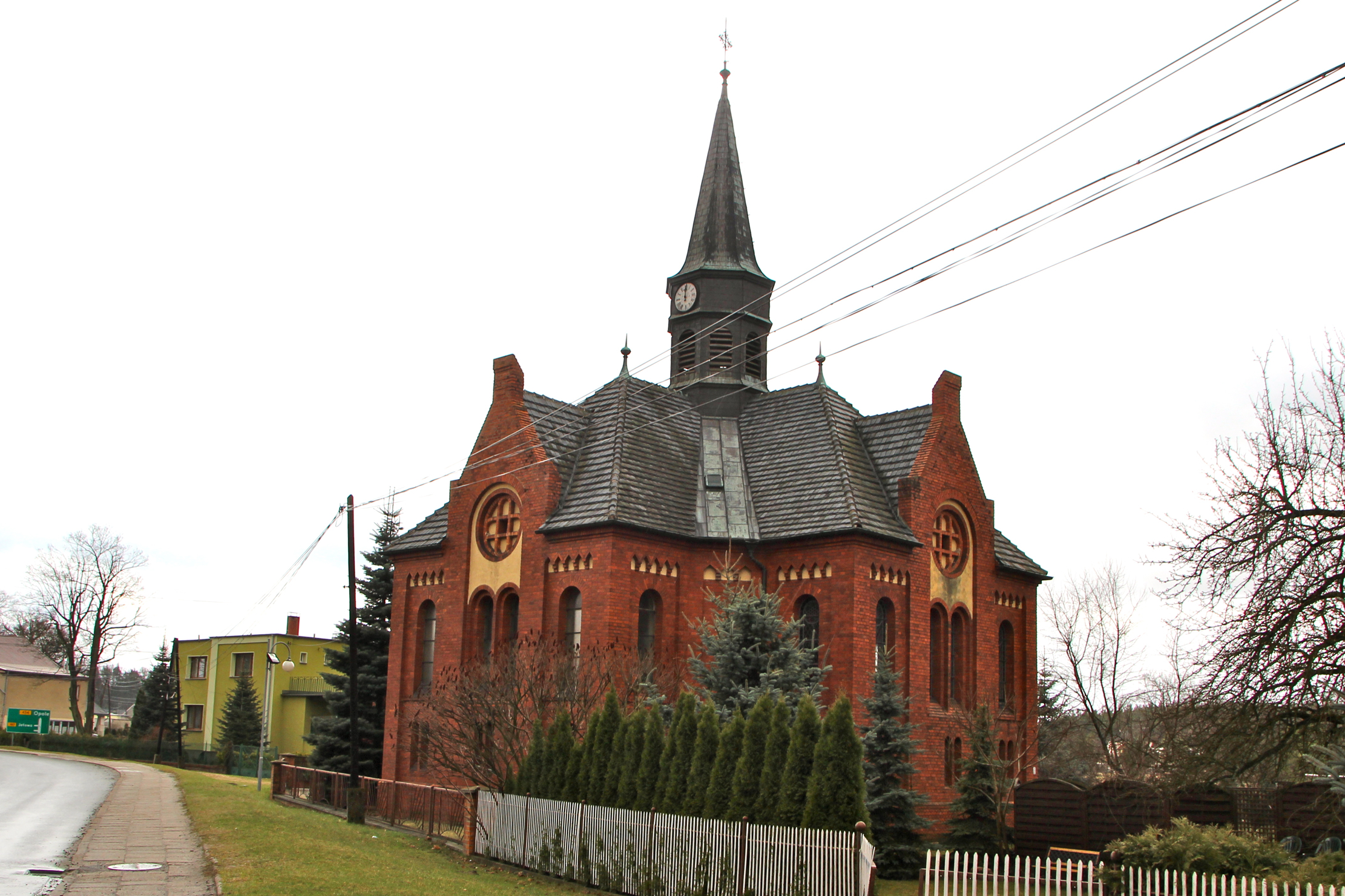
- Catholic church

- Location within Poland
- Coordinates: 50°48′N 17°53′E
- Country: Poland
- Voivodeship: Opole
- County: Opole
- Gmina: Dobrzeń Wielki
- Population: 1,200

Kup [kup] is a village in the administrative district of Gmina Dobrzeń Wielki, within Opole County, Opole Voivodeship, in south-western Poland.
