= Krzanowice, Opole Voivodeship =

Krzanowice
- Village
- Location within Poland
- Coordinates: 50°43′N 17°56′E
- Country: Poland
- Voivodeship: Opole
- County: Opole
- Gmina: Dobrzeń Wielki
- Population: 400

Krzanowice [kʂanɔˈvit͡sɛ] is a village in the administrative district of Gmina Dobrzeń Wielki, within Opole County, Opole Voivodeship, in south-western Poland.
