= Jedlice, Opole Voivodeship =

Jedlice
- Village
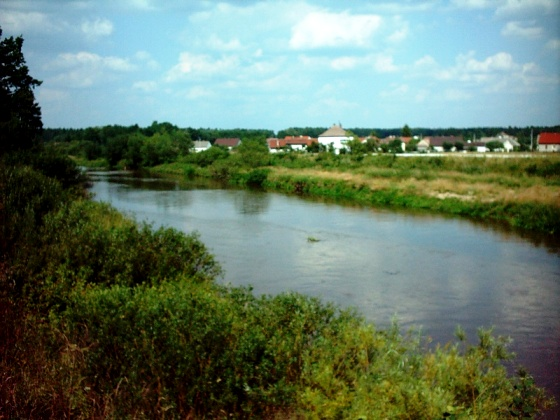

- Location within Poland
- Coordinates: 50°43′N 18°12′E
- Country: Poland
- Voivodeship: Opole
- County: Opole
- Gmina: Ozimek
- Population: 140

Jedlice [jɛˈdlit͡sɛ] (German: Jedlitze) is a village in the administrative district of Gmina Ozimek, within Opole County, Opole Voivodeship, in south-western Poland.
