= Opole County =

Opole County may refer to:

- Opole County, Lublin Voivodeship (eastern Poland)
- Opole County, Opole Voivodeship (south-western Poland)
