= Dębie, Opole Voivodeship =

Dębie
- Village
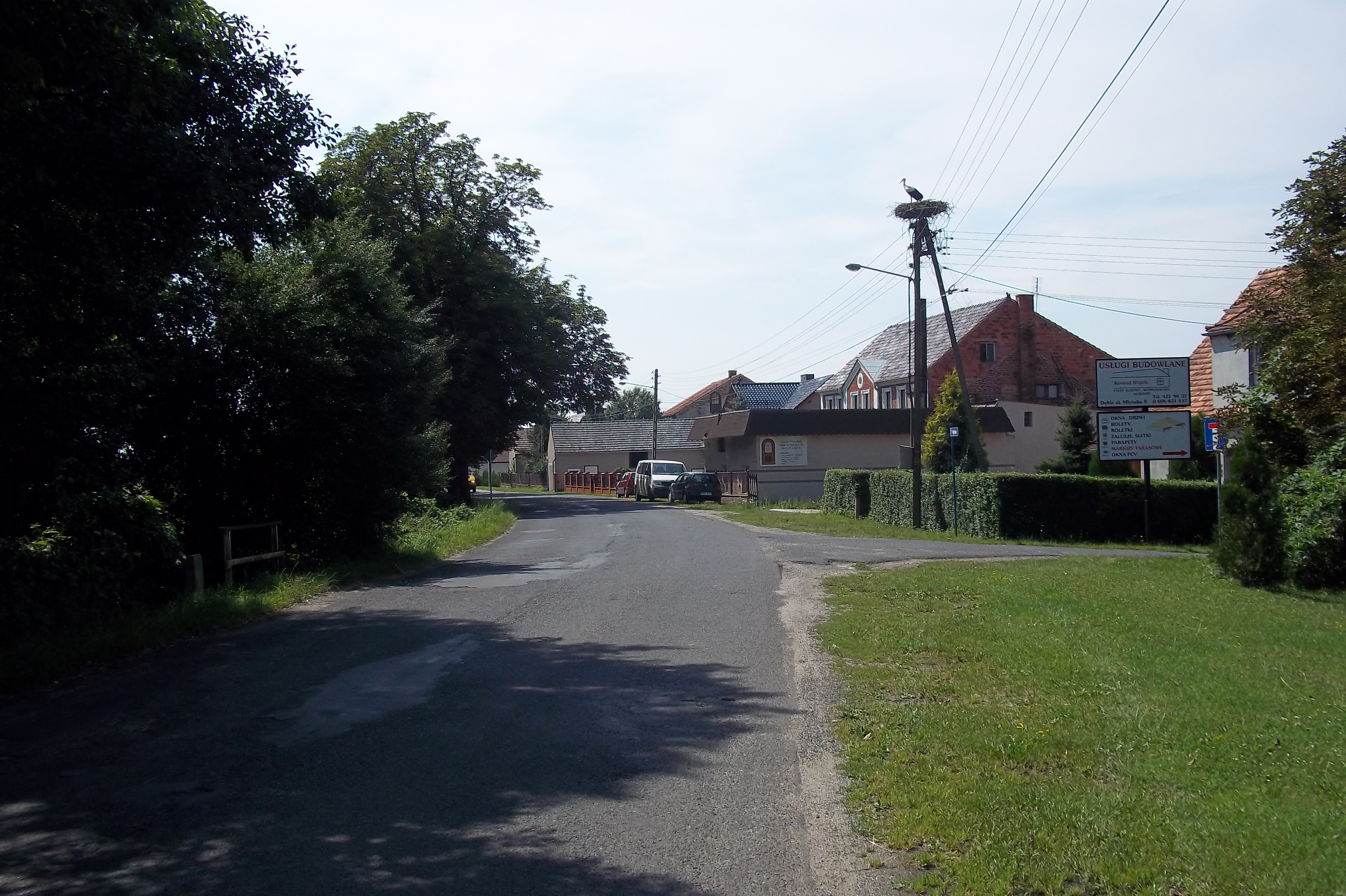

- Location within Poland
- Coordinates: 50°38′18″N 18°5′43″E
- Country: Poland
- Voivodeship: Opole
- County: Opole
- Gmina: Chrząstowice
- Population: 540

Dębie [ˈdɛmbjɛ] is a village in the administrative district of Gmina Chrząstowice, within Opole County, Opole Voivodeship, in southwestern Poland.
