= Zagwiździe =

- Village
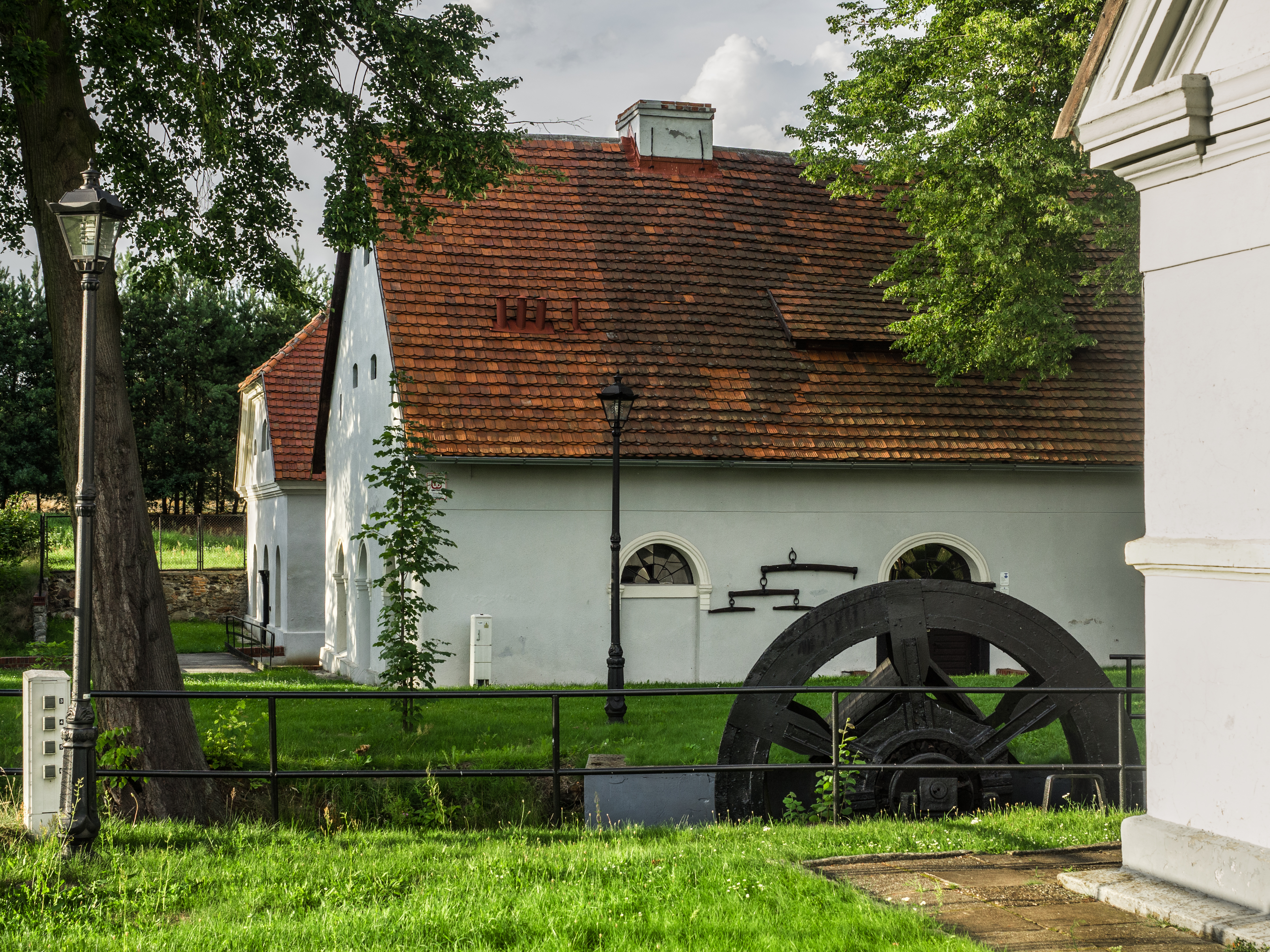
- Former iron mill

- Location within Poland
- Coordinates: 50°53′N 17°59′E
- Country: Poland
- Voivodeship: Opole
- County: Opole
- Gmina: Murów
- Website: http://www.murow.pl

Zagwiździe [zaɡˈviʑd͡ʑɛ] (German Friedrichsthal) is a village in the administrative district of Gmina Murów, within Opole County, Opole Voivodeship, Silesia in south-western Poland.

== Notable residents ==
- Johann Friedrich Krigar (1774-1852)
- Walter von Hippel (1897–1972), Luftwaffe general
