= Bożejów =

- Village
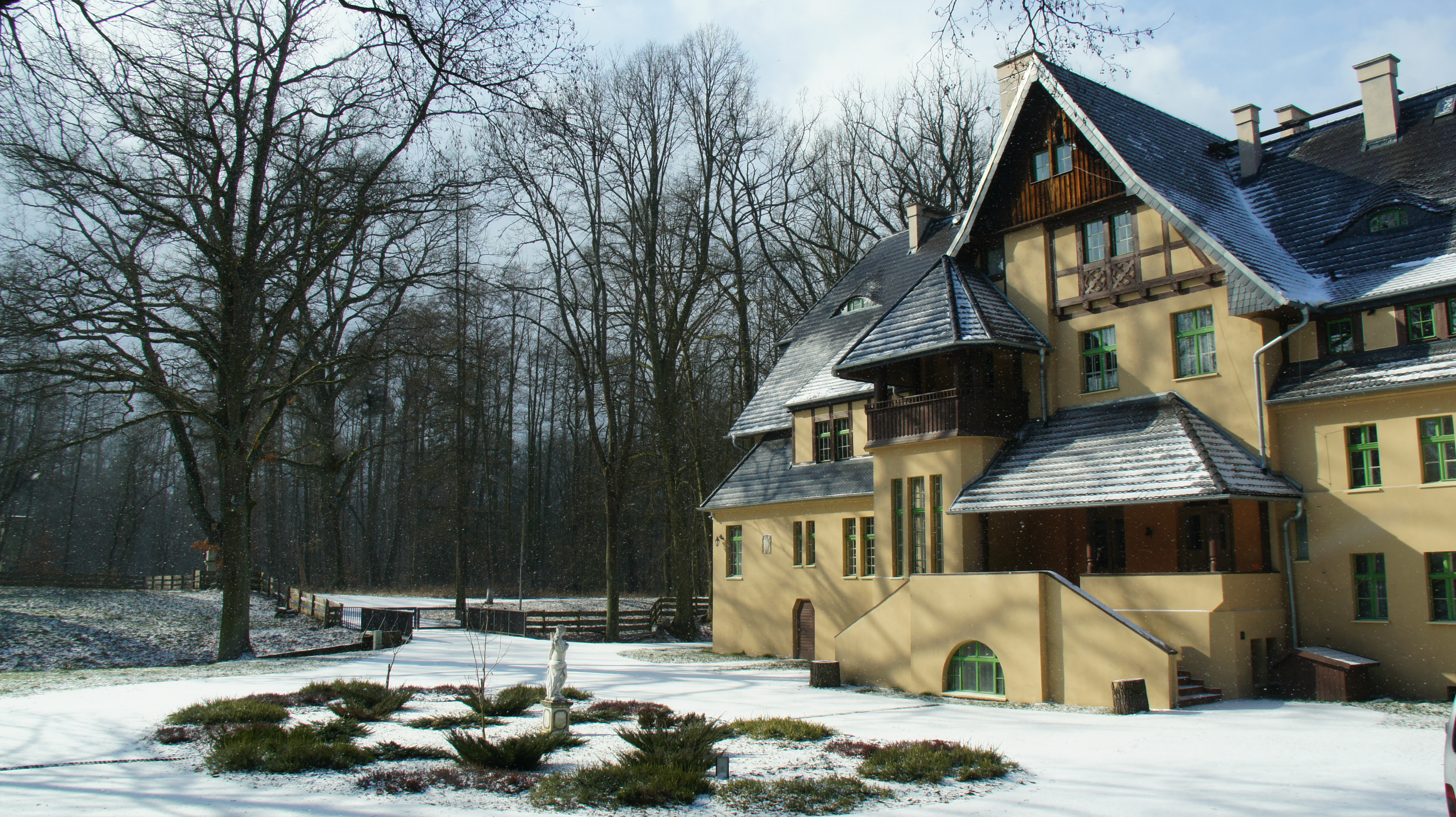
- Manor house

- Location within Poland
- Coordinates: 50°55′36″N 18°03′19″E
- Country: Poland
- Voivodeship: Opole
- County: Opole
- Gmina: Murów
- Population: 9

Bożejów [bɔˈʐɛjuf] is a village in the administrative district of Gmina Murów, within Opole County, Opole Voivodeship, in south-western Poland.

== The Bozejow Mansion ==
The Bożejów mansion's foundation dates back to 1801, when it was built by German aristocracy. The building was fully renovated in 1911, under the eye of the famous Wroclavian architect Richard Mohr. Prior to the second world war, Archduke Franz Ferdinand of Austria and several representatives of the Prussian nobility were well-invited hunting companions.

After the war the possession was dis repairing, being fundamentally rebuilt in 2014-2018 by family Garack, whereby its unique hunting character was maintained.

The eclectic mansion consists of mix of a wattle & daub and a wooden construction and a hip roof covered with tiles. The residence rises on a rectangular plan, its compact shape is varied with several loggias and balconies. The half-timbered construction of the upper parts of the building is accentuated on the façades. 99% of the window joinery, door woodworks and staircases are original. A stone plaque embedded near the main entrance has also been preserved. The mansions' pre-war memoirs remain immortalized in H. Wodarz's book „Emilienhütte - Meine Welt”.
