= Daniec =

Daniec Danietz
- Village
- Location within Poland
- Coordinates: 50°37′N 18°7′E
- Country: Poland
- Voivodeship: Opole
- County: Opole
- Gmina: Chrząstowice
- Population: 1,400

Daniec [ˈdaɲɛt͡s] (German: Danietz) is a village in the administrative district of Gmina Chrząstowice, within Opole County, Opole Voivodeship, in south-western Poland.
