= Fritz Streletz =

German army general (1926–2025)

Generaloberst Fritz Streletz
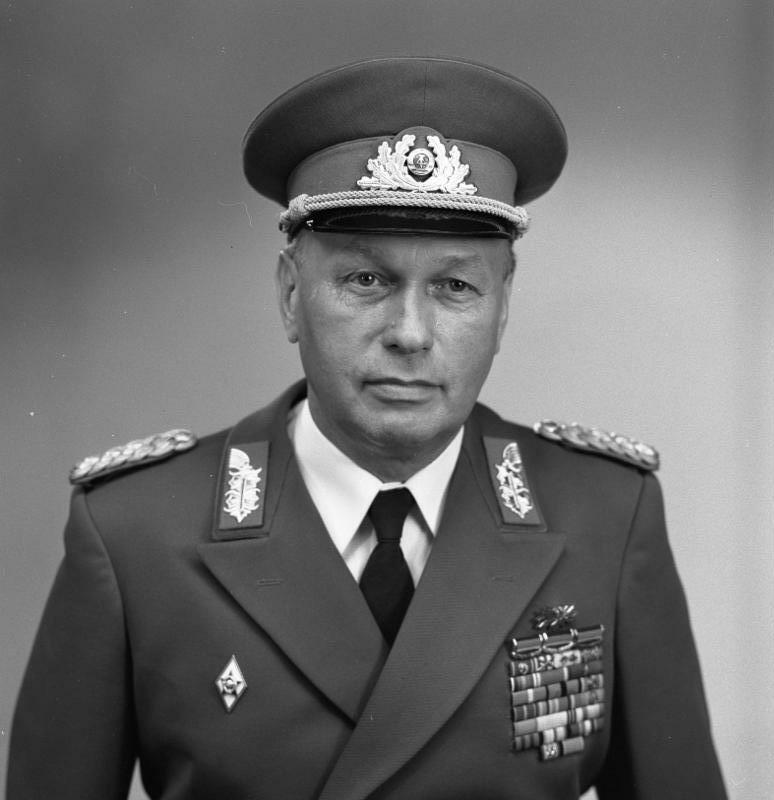
- Streletz in 1982

Deputy Minister of National Defence Chief of Staff of the National People's Army
- In office 1 January 1979 – 31 December 1989
- Minister: Heinz Keßler; Theodor Hoffmann
- Preceded by: Heinz Keßler
- Succeeded by: Manfred Grätz

Secretary of the National Defense Council
- In office 3 May 1971 – 6 December 1989
- Chairman: Erich Honecker; Egon Krenz
- Preceded by: Erich Honecker
- Succeeded by: Position abolished

Personal details
- Born: 28 September 1926 Friedrichsgrätz, Province of Upper Silesia, Free State of Prussia, Weimar Republic (now Grodziec, Poland)
- Died: 24 March 2025 (aged 98) Oranienburg, Brandenburg, Germany
- Party: Socialist Unity Party (1948–1989)

Military service
- Allegiance: Nazi Germany (1944–1945); East Germany (1948–1990)
- Branch/service: Wehrmacht; National People's Army
- Years of service: 1944–45; 1948–90
- Rank: Generaloberst
- Criminal information
- Status: Released early
- Conviction: Manslaughter
- Penalty: 5 1/2 years
- Central institution membership: 1981–1989: Full member, Central Committee; Other offices held: 1971–1989: Member, National Defence Council

Fritz Streletz (28 September 1926 – 24 March 2025) was a German army general of the GDR.

In 1944, he entered the Wehrmacht as a noncommissioned officer after graduating from military school in Deggendorf. He was captured by Soviet forces in February 1945 and released in October 1948, whereupon he joined the Volkspolizei. In 1956, he joined the precursor to the National People's Army, the Kasernierte Volkspolizei, as an officer.

In 1991, after the reunification of Germany, Streletz was arrested. He was charged in February 1992 for the incitement to kill German civilians fleeing East Germany and was found guilty. He was sentenced to five years and six months in prison but was released in October 1997.

Streletz remained committed to the GDR's ideals after reunification.

Streletz died on 24 March 2025, at the age of 98.
