= Bukowo, Opole Voivodeship =

Bukowo
- Village
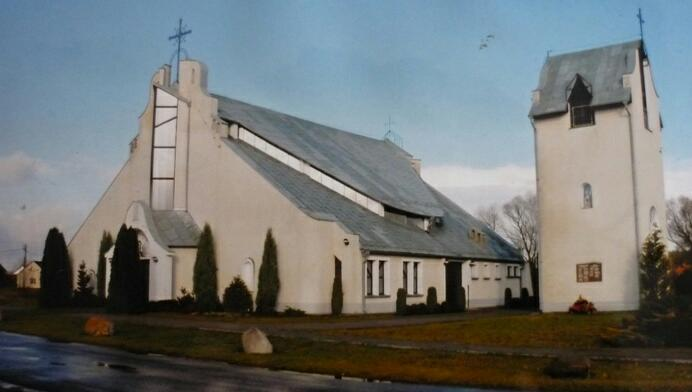
- Church of Our Lady and Saint Anthony

- Location within Poland
- Coordinates: 50°54′7″N 18°5′39″E
- Country: Poland
- Voivodeship: Opole
- County: Opole
- Gmina: Murów

Bukowo [buˈkɔvɔ] is a village in the administrative district of Gmina Murów, within Opole County, Opole Voivodeship, in south-western Poland.
