= Gmina Dobrzeń Wielki =

Gmina Dobrzeń Wielki Gemeinde Groß Döbern Dobrzeń Wielki Commune
- Gmina
- Coat of arms
- Interactive map of Gmina Dobrzeń Wielki
- Coordinates (Dobrzeń Wielki): 50°46′N 17°52′E
- Country: Poland
- Voivodeship: Opole
- County: Opole
- Seat: Dobrzeń Wielki

Area
  - Total: 63.47 km^{2} (24.51 sq mi)

Population (2022-12-31)
  - Total: 9,068
  - Density: 142.9/km^{2} (370.0/sq mi)
- Time zone: UTC+1 (CET)
  - Summer (DST): UTC+2 (CEST)
- Vehicle registration: OPO
- Website: dobrzenwielki.pl

Gmina Dobrzeń Wielki (German: Gemeinde Groß Döbern) is a rural gmina (administrative district) in Opole County, Opole Voivodeship, in southern Poland. Its seat is the village of Dobrzeń Wielki, which lies approximately 13 kilometres (8 mi) north-west of the regional capital Opole.

The gmina covers an area of 63.47 km^{2} (24.5 sq mi) and, as of 31 December 2022, has a total population of 9,068. Since 2009 it has been an officially bilingual commune in Polish and German, with German recognised as an auxiliary language and bilingual place names in use. Part of the gmina lies within the Stobrawa Landscape Park.

== Villages ==
Gmina Dobrzeń Wielki currently contains the villages of Chróścice, Dobrzeń Mały, Dobrzeń Wielki and Kup.

Until 31 December 2016 the gmina also included the villages of Borki, Brzezie, Czarnowąsy, Krzanowice and Świerkle, which were (wholly or partly) incorporated into the city of Opole on 1 January 2017.

== Neighbouring gminas ==
Gmina Dobrzeń Wielki is bordered by the city of Opole and by the gminas of Dąbrowa, Łubniany, Murów, Pokój and Popielów.

== Twin towns – sister cities ==
Gmina Dobrzeń Wielki is twinned with two other towns, these being:

- Heuchelheim, Germany
- Wil, Switzerland
