= Murów =

- Village
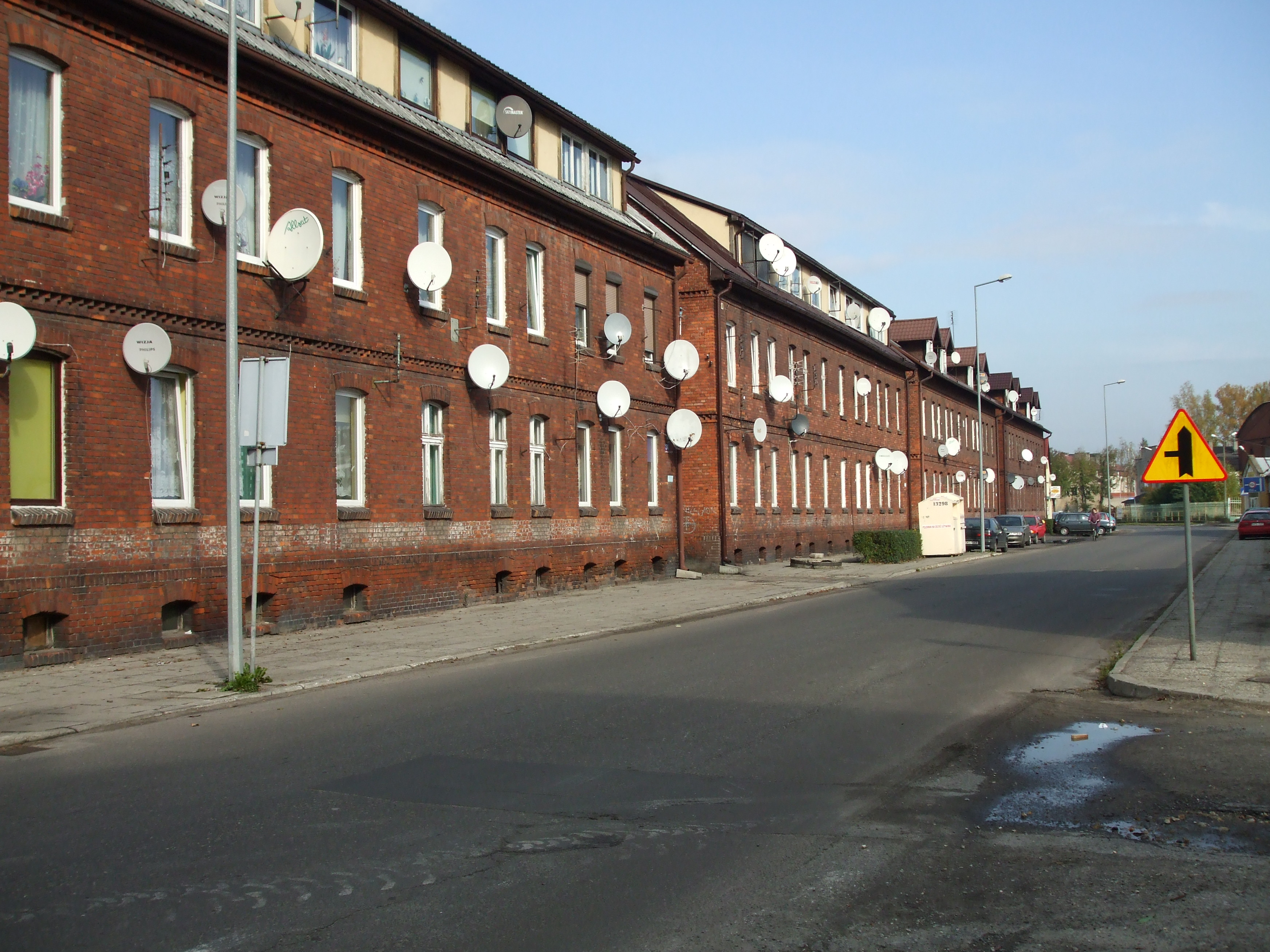

- Location within Poland
- Coordinates: 50°52′N 17°57′E
- Country: Poland
- Voivodeship: Opole
- County: Opole
- Gmina: Murów
- Website: http://www.murow.pl

Murów [ˈmuruf] is a village in Opole County, Opole Voivodeship, in south-western Poland. It is the seat of the gmina (administrative district) called Gmina Murów.
