= Czarna Woda, Opole Voivodeship =

Czarna Woda
- Village
- Location within Poland
- Coordinates: 50°52′44″N 17°54′40″E
- Country: Poland
- Voivodeship: Opole
- County: Opole
- Gmina: Murów
- Population: 32

Czarna Woda [ˈt͡ʂarna ˈvɔda] is a village in the administrative district of Gmina Murów, within Opole County, Opole Voivodeship, in south-western Poland.
