= Gmina Ozimek =

Gmina Ozimek Ozimek Commune
- Gmina
- Coat of arms
- Interactive map of Gmina Ozimek
- Coordinates (Ozimek): 50°40′23″N 18°12′47″E
- Country: Poland
- Voivodeship: Opole
- County: Opole
- Seat: Ozimek

Area
  - Total: 126.5 km^{2} (48.8 sq mi)

Population (2019-06-30)
  - Total: 19,594
  - Density: 154.9/km^{2} (401.2/sq mi)
  - Urban: 8,657
  - Rural: 10,937
- Website: http://www.ozimek.pl/

Gmina Ozimek is an urban-rural gmina (administrative district) in Opole County, Opole Voivodeship, in south-western Poland. Its seat is the town of Ozimek, which lies approximately 20 kilometres (12 mi) east of the regional capital Opole.

The gmina covers an area of 126.5 square kilometres (48.8 sq mi), and as of 2019 its total population is 19,594.

== Villages ==
Apart from the town of Ozimek, Gmina Ozimek contains the villages and settlements of Antoniów, Biestrzynnik, Chobie, Dylaki, Grodziec, Jedlice, Krasiejów, Krzyżowa Dolina, Mnichus, Nowa Schodnia, Pustków, Schodnia and Szczedrzyk.

== Neighbouring gminas ==
Gmina Ozimek is bordered by the gminas of Chrząstowice, Dobrodzień, Izbicko, Kolonowskie, Strzelce Opolskie, Turawa and Zębowice.

== Twin towns – sister cities ==
Gmina Ozimek is twinned with:

- Heinsberg, Germany
- Krompachy, Slovakia
- Přerov, Czech Republic
- Rýmařov, Czech Republic
