= Święciny =

- Village
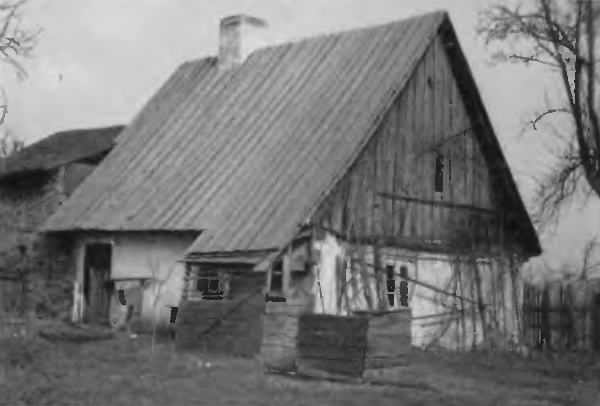

- Location within Poland
- Coordinates: 50°56′4″N 17°58′33″E
- Country: Poland
- Voivodeship: Opole
- County: Opole
- Gmina: Murów
- Population: 80

Święciny (Polish: [ɕfjɛɲˈt͡ɕinɨ]) is a village in the administrative district of Gmina Murów, within Opole County, Opole Voivodeship, in south-western Poland.
