= Dobrzeń Wielki =

Dobrzeń Wielki Groß Döbern
- Village
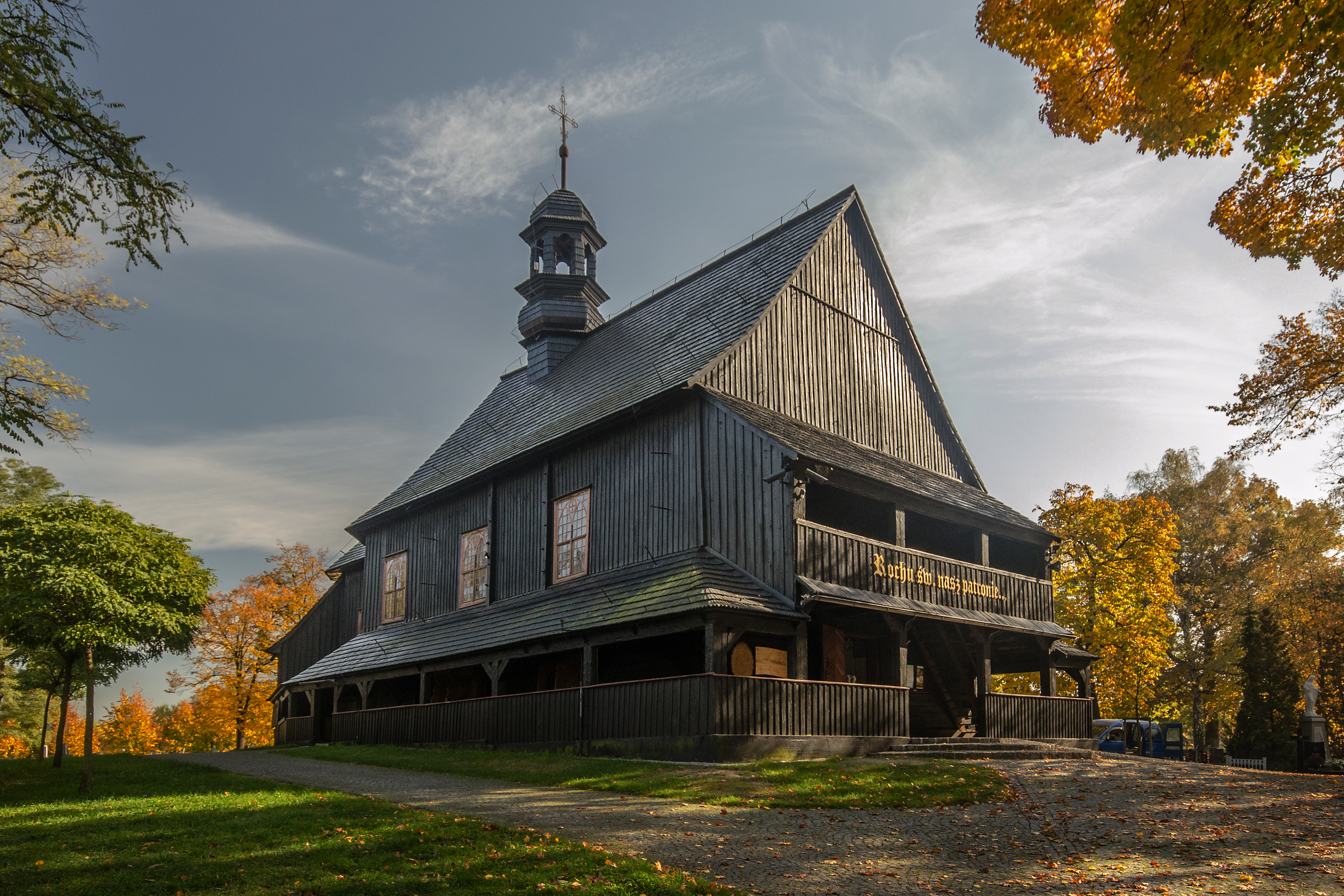
- Church of Saint Roch

- Location within Poland
- Coordinates: 50°46′N 17°52′E
- Country: Poland
- Voivodeship: Opole
- County: Opole
- Gmina: Dobrzeń Wielki

Population
  - Total: 4,500
- Time zone: UTC+1 (CET)
  - Summer (DST): UTC+2 (CEST)
- Vehicle registration: OPO

Dobrzeń Wielki (Polish pronunciation: [ˈdɔbʐɛj̃ ˈvjɛlkʲi], German: Groß Döbern) is a village in Opole County, Opole Voivodeship, in south-western Poland. It is the seat of the Gmina Dobrzeń Wielki (rural community) which has been officially bilingual in Polish and German since 2009. It is bordered by the Popielów municipality to the west; the Pokój municipality to the north, the Murów and Łubniany districts to the east, in addition to Opole city and the Dąbrowa and Lewin Brzeski municipalities to the south.

== Geography ==
The climate is characteristical for that of the country, with a temperature variation slightly below average. January sees temperatures between -1 and 9 degrees Celsius, in comparison to an average of 17.8 in July. The Oder River flows from the southeast to the northwest of the district, and is the area's main watercourse. This stretch is navigable and is frequently used for water transport. The river's water levels reach their highest state from February - March and July - August, whereas they are lowest from September - October. Several other waterways, such as the Mala Panew, Żydówka, Brynica, Jemielnica, Swornica, and Brzeziczanka form a vast river network in the area, in addition to numerous streams. Several ponds, oxbow lakes, and a network of canals and drainage ditches are also situated in the town's vicinity. The Brynica and Odra rivers are characterized by relatively flat surrounds, thus the Dobrzen Wielki area is susceptible to flooding. One of the town's most catastrophic floods occurred in 1997, when water submerged land on both sides of the Oder.

== History ==
The town's first written mentions of the town, cited as Dobren, can be derived from a document dated 1228, concerning the transfer of the Norbertine Monastery from Rybnik to the nearby village of Czarnowąsy. A later document, however, dated 1279, provides the name of the town as Dobrzeń, and mentions that it is part of the province of Dobrzeń. The village itself was under the possession of Kazimierz, Duke of Opole, and in 1279, was granted Magdeburg rights. In 1658, the Church of St. Roch (Kosciol Sw. Rocha) was constructed, following the invasion of the Norbertine monastery by Protestant armies in 1643.

The history of Dobrzeń Wielki was always linked to the Duchy of Opole which separated from Poland and came under the suzerainty of Bohemia in 1327, fell to the Habsburgs in 1526, became Prussian after the First Silesian War in 1742 and had been part of Germany since 1871.

In the Upper Silesia plebiscite held on March 20, 1921, in Groß Döbern, 1,216 votes (67.9%) were cast in favor of remaining with Germany and 576 votes (32.1%) were cast in favor of joining reborn Poland. The village therefore remained in the Weimar Republic.

With the end of World War II in 1945, the village became part of Poland.

== Education ==
- Publiczne Liceum Ogólnokształcące w Dobrzeniu Wielkim

== People ==
- Jan Ficek (1790–1862), born in Groß Döbern (Dobrzeń Wielki), after studies in Breslau priest in Deutsch Piekar (Piekary Śląskie)
- Adolf Paul Ledwolorz (1892–1973), born in Groß Döbern (Dobrzeń Wielki), priest, author (ecclesiastical law, 1924)
- Friedrich Nippert (1864–1930), teacher in Linsen (Lędzina) near Festenberg (Twardogóra), owner of the Cross of Merit for war aid in the First World War, married in Groß Döbern (Dobrzeń Wielki)
- Lorenz Schwietz (1850–1925), executioner, born in Groß Döbern (Dobrzeń Wielki)
