= Grodziec, Gmina Ozimek =

Grodziec
- Village
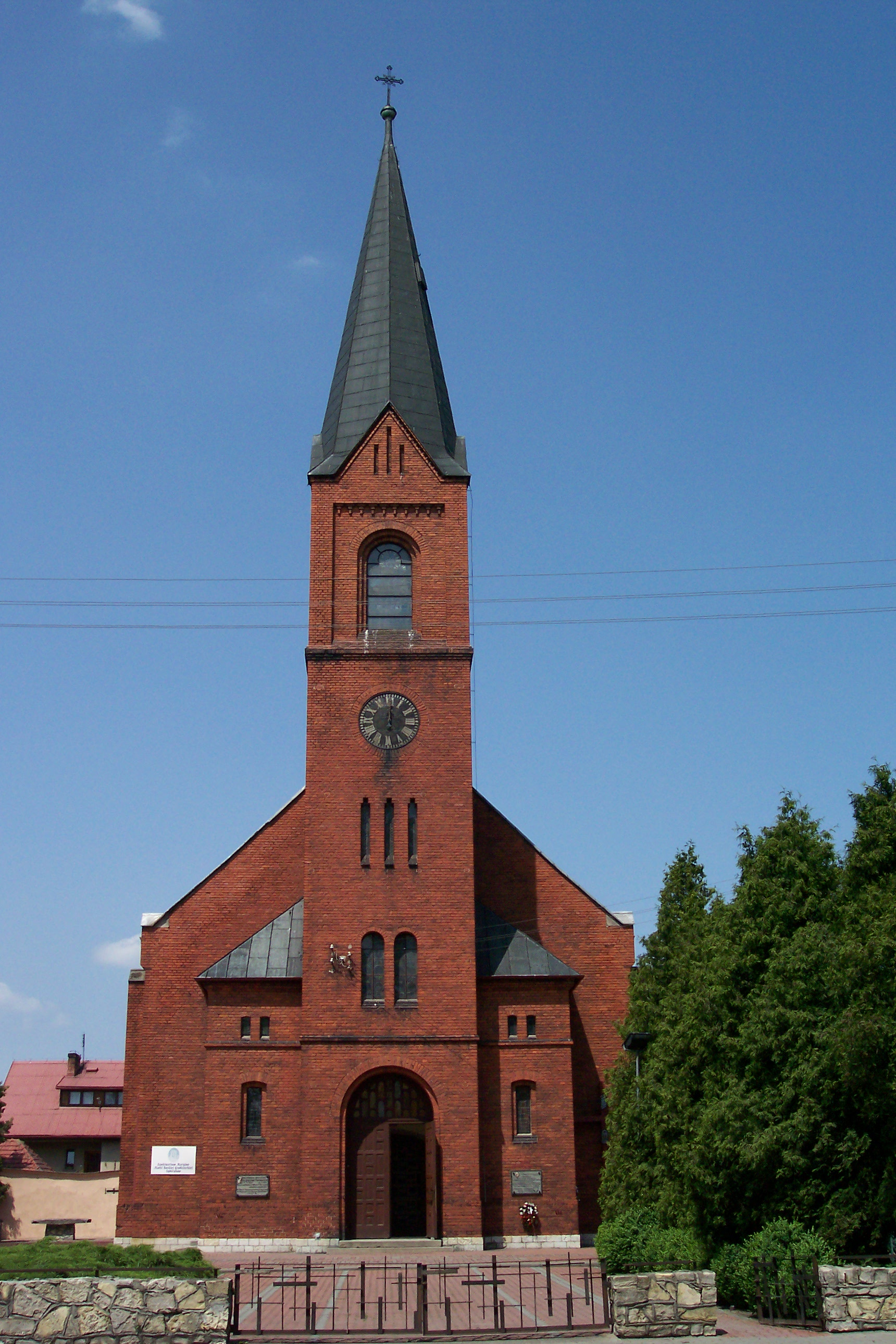
- Our Lady of Częstochowa and Saint Adalbert church in Grodziec

- Location within Poland
- Coordinates: 50°42′18″N 18°16′51″E
- Country: Poland
- Voivodeship: Opole
- County: Opole
- Gmina: Ozimek
- Population: 1,349
- Time zone: UTC+1 (CET)
  - Summer (DST): UTC+2 (CEST)
- Vehicle registration: OPO

Grodziec [ˈɡrɔd͡ʑɛt͡s] (German: Friedrichsgrätz) is a village in the administrative district of Gmina Ozimek, within Opole County, Opole Voivodeship, in southern Poland.

== History ==
In the 10th century the area became part of the emerging Polish state, and later on, it was part of Poland, Bohemia (Czechia), Prussia, and Germany. During World War II, the Germans operated the E385 forced labour subcamp of the Stalag VIII-B/344 prisoner-of-war camp in the village. After Germany's defeat in the war, in 1945, the village became again part of Poland.
