= Joachim Halupczok =

Polish cyclist

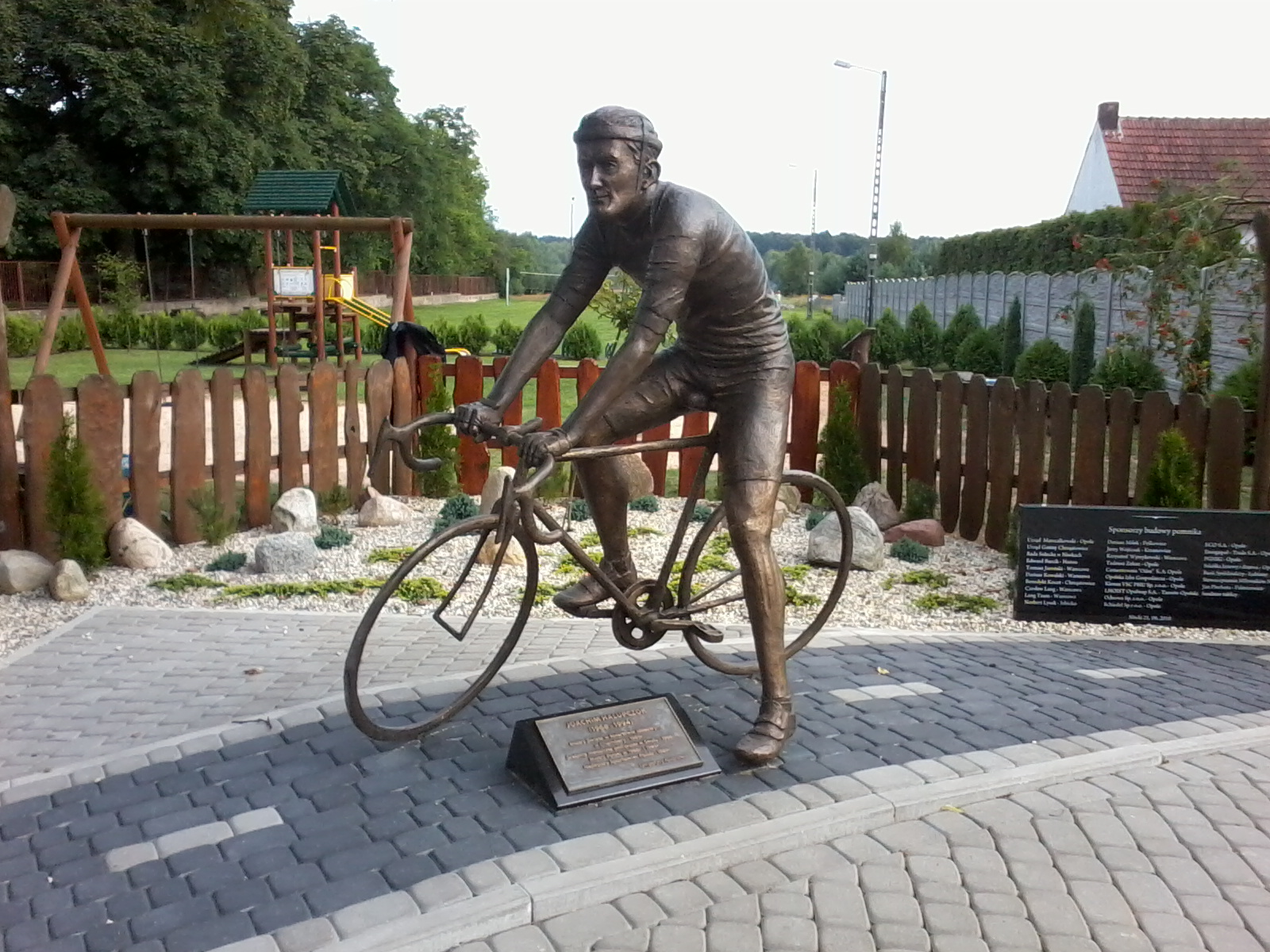
- Statue of Halupczok in Niwki, Opole County, his birthplace

Personal information
- Full name: Joachim Halupczok
- Born: 3 June 1968 Niwki, Poland
- Died: 5 February 1994 (aged 25) Opole, Poland

Cycling career
- Sport: Cycling
- Discipline: Road
- Role: Rider
Medal record
Men's cycling
Representing Poland
Olympic Games
Silver medal – second place	1988 Seoul	Time Trial

Joachim Halupczok (3 June 1968 – 5 February 1994) was a Polish racing cyclist. He won the silver medal in the team time trial at the 1988 Summer Olympics along with Andrzej Sypytkowski, Marek Leśniewski and Zenon Jaskuła.

In 1989 he became the amateur champion at the 1989 UCI Road World Championships.

In 1990 he signed professional terms and took part in the World Championships in Utsunomiya, Japan. He finished the World Championship course eight seconds behind the winner within a peloton of the best riders in the world including Gianni Bugno, Greg LeMond, Pedro Delgado, Sean Kelly and Miguel Indurain. He was later diagnosed with cardiac arrhythmia, which meant that he had to quit professional cycling. It was suspected that the cause of his health problems was the use of EPO. Professor Romuald Lewicki from Zakład Medycyny Sportowej WAM in Łódź (Institute of Sports Medicine) claims that Halupczok's cardiac arrhythmia was genetic because his father and son suffer from the same condition.

== Death ==
Halupczok died on the way to the hospital, after he collapsed during a warm-up for a charity indoor football tournament in Opole on 5 February 1994. The autopsy has shown that he had not died of a heart attack. He left his wife and two children.
