= Gmina Chrząstowice =

Gmina Chrząstowice Gemeinde Chronstau Chrząstowice Commune
- Gmina
- Flag Coat of arms
- Interactive map of Gmina Chrząstowice
- Coordinates (Chrząstowice): 50°39′52″N 18°4′9″E
- Country: Poland
- Voivodeship: Opole
- County: Opole
- Seat: Chrząstowice

Area
  - Total: 82.31 km^{2} (31.78 sq mi)

Population (2019-06-30)
  - Total: 6,948
  - Density: 84.41/km^{2} (218.6/sq mi)
- Time zone: UTC+1 (CET)
  - Summer (DST): UTC+2 (CEST)
- Vehicle registration: OPO
- Website: http://www.chrzastowice.pl

Gmina Chrząstowice (German: Gemeinde Chronstau) is a rural gmina (administrative district) in Opole County, Opole Voivodeship, in south-western Poland. Its seat is the village of Chrząstowice, which lies approximately 10 kilometres (6 mi) east of the regional capital Opole.

The gmina is officially bilingual (Polish and German), with a significant German community having remained in the area after it was transferred from Germany to Poland following World War II in 1945.

The gmina covers an area of 82.31 square kilometres (31.8 sq mi), and as of 2019, its total population was 6,948.

== History ==
In the Middle Ages, the area belonged to the Kingdom of Poland, with occasional periods of Bohemian rule. After the feudal fragmentation of Poland it had a certain amount of autonomy, before becoming part of the Habsburg Empire in 1526. In the second half of the 17th century it again briefly came under Polish rule, before returning to the Habsburgs. After the War of Austrian succession the area, along with rest of Silesia was taken by Kingdom of Prussia, and was part of it and its successor states; the gmina was located in the former German Province of Lower Silesia. After World War II, the area became part of Poland again.

== Villages ==
The commune contains the villages and settlements of: Chrząstowice, Dąbrowice, Daniec, Dębie, Dębska Kuźnia, Falmirowice, Lędziny, Niwki and Suchy Bór.

== Neighbouring gminas ==
Gmina Chrząstowice is bordered by the city of Opole and by the gminas of Izbicko, Ozimek, Tarnów Opolski and Turawa.

== Twin towns – sister cities ==
Gmina Chrząstowice is twinned with:

- Glashütte, Germany
- Zátor, Czech Republic
