= Gmina Murów =

Gmina Murów Gemeinde Murow Murów Commune
- Gmina
- Flag Coat of arms
- Interactive map of Gmina Murów; Gemeinde Murow
- Coordinates (Murów): 50°52′N 17°57′E
- Country: Poland
- Voivodeship: Opole
- County: Opole
- Seat: Murów

Area
  - Total: 159.7 km^{2} (61.7 sq mi)

Population (2019-06-30)
  - Total: 5,306
  - Density: 33.22/km^{2} (86.05/sq mi)
- Time zone: UTC+1 (CET)
  - Summer (DST): UTC+2 (CEST)
- Vehicle registration: OPO
- Website: http://www.murow.pl

Gmina Murów (German: Gemeinde Murow) is a rural gmina (administrative district) in Opole County, Opole Voivodeship, in south-western Poland. Its seat is the village of Murów, which lies approximately 23 kilometres (14 mi) north of the regional capital Opole.

The gmina covers an area of 159.7 square kilometres (61.7 sq mi), and as of 2019 its total population is 5,306. Since 2009 the commune, like much of the region, has been bilingual in Polish and German.

The gmina contains part of the protected area called Stobrawa Landscape Park.

== Villages ==
The commune contains the villages and settlements of:

- Murów
- Bożejów
- Bukowo
- Czarna Woda
- Dębiniec
- Grabczok
- Grabice
- Kały
- Kęszyce
- Mańczok
- Młodnik
- Morcinek
- Nowe Budkowice
- Okoły
- Radomierowice
- Stare Budkowice
- Święciny
- Wojszyn
- Zagwiździe

== Neighbouring gminas ==
Gmina Murów is bordered by the gminas of Dobrzeń Wielki, Kluczbork, Lasowice Wielkie, Łubniany, Pokój and Wołczyn.

== Twin towns – sister cities ==
Gmina Murów is twinned with:

- Vallendar, Germany
