= Chrząstowice, Opole Voivodeship =

Chrząstowice Chronstau
- Village
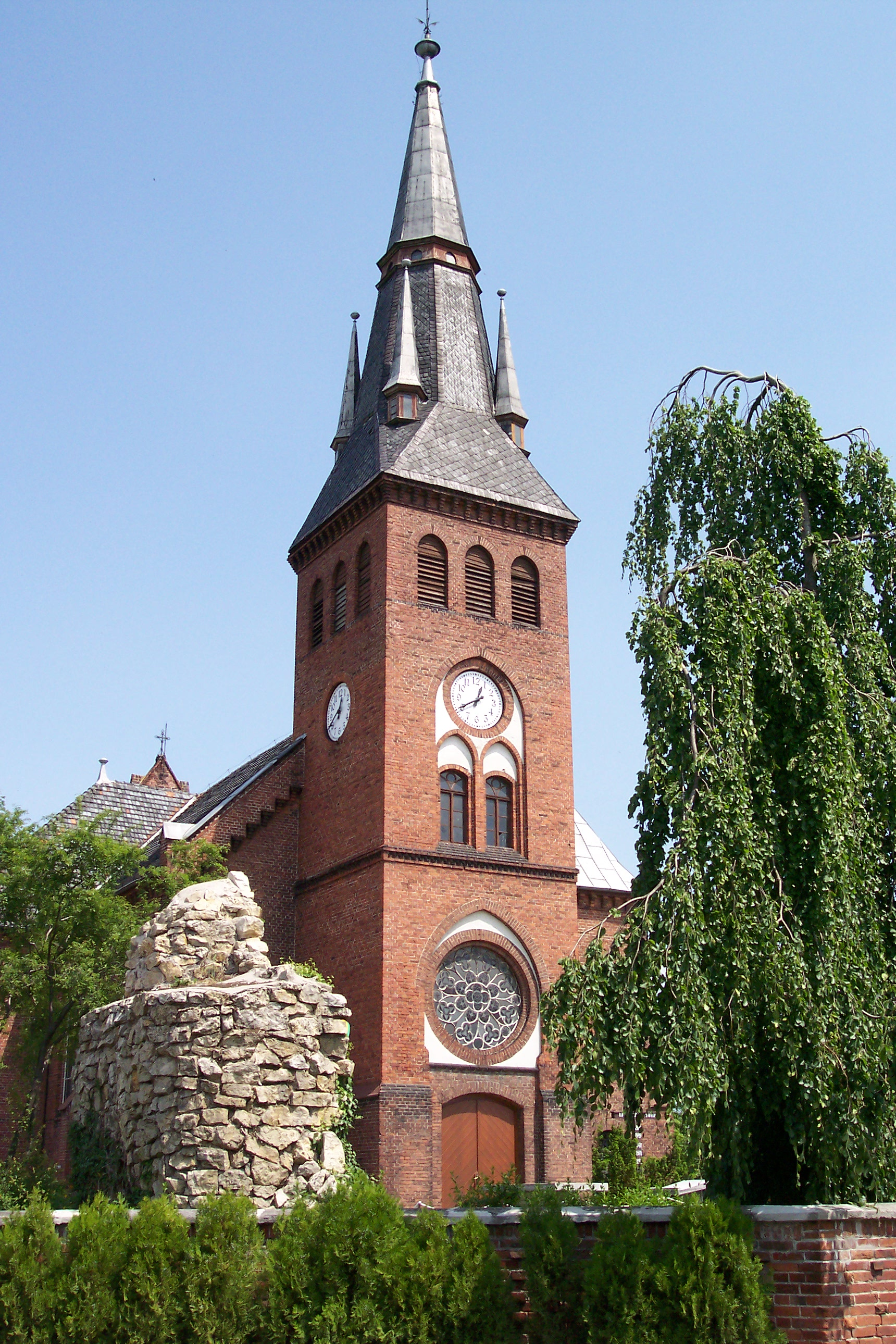
- Church of the Immaculate Conception

- Location within Poland
- Coordinates: 50°39′52″N 18°4′9″E
- Country: Poland
- Voivodeship: Opole
- County: Opole
- Gmina: Chrząstowice
- Population: 1,200
- Postal Code: 46-053
- Car plates: OPO
- SIMC: 0492575

Chrząstowice [xʂɔ̃stɔˈvit͡sɛ] is a village in Opole County, Opole Voivodeship, in south-western Poland. It is the seat of the gmina (administrative district) called Gmina Chrząstowice, which has been officially bilingual in Polish and German since 2006.
