= Opole County, Opole Voivodeship =

Opole County Powiat opolski
- County
- Flag Coat of arms

- Location within the voivodeship
- Coordinates (Opole): 50°40′N 17°56′E
- Country: Poland
- Voivodeship: Opole
- Seat: Opole
- Gminas: Total 13: Gmina Chrząstowice; Gmina Dąbrowa; Gmina Dobrzeń Wielki; Gmina Komprachcice; Gmina Łubniany; Gmina Murów; Gmina Niemodlin; Gmina Ozimek; Gmina Popielów; Gmina Prószków; Gmina Tarnów Opolski; Gmina Tułowice; Gmina Turawa

Area
  - Total: 1,586.82 km^{2} (612.67 sq mi)

Population (2019-06-30)
  - Total: 123,487
  - Density: 77.8204/km^{2} (201.554/sq mi)
  - Urban: 21,553
  - Rural: 101,934
- Car plates: OPO
- Website: www.powiatopolski.pl

Opole County (Polish: powiat opolski) is a unit of territorial administration and local government (powiat) in Opole Voivodeship, south-western Poland. It came into being on January 1, 1999, as a result of the Polish local government reforms passed in 1998. Its administrative seat is the city of Opole, although the city is not part of the county (it constitutes a separate city county). The county contains four towns: Ozimek, 20 km (12 mi) east of Opole, Niemodlin, 24 km (15 mi) west of Opole, Prószków, 11 km (7 mi) south-west of Opole, and Tułowice, 22 kilometres (14 mi) south-west of Opole.

The county covers an area of 1,586.82 square kilometres (612.7 sq mi). As of 2019 its total population is 123,487, out of which the population of Ozimek is 8,657, that of Niemodlin is 6,315, that of Tułowice is 4,011, that of Prószków is 2,570, and the rural population is 101,934.

== Neighbouring counties ==
Apart from the city of Opole, Opole County is also bordered by Namysłów County and Kluczbork County to the north, Olesno County to the north-east, Strzelce County to the south-east, Krapkowice County and Prudnik County to the south, Nysa County to the south-west, and Brzeg County to the north-west.

== Administrative division ==
The county is subdivided into 13 gminas (4 urban-rural and 9 rural). These are listed in the following table, in descending order of population.

Gmina	Type	Area (km^{2})	Population (2019)	Seat
Gmina Ozimek	urban-rural	126.5	19,594	Ozimek
Gmina Niemodlin	urban-rural	183.2	13,191	Niemodlin
Gmina Turawa	rural	171.5	9,990	Turawa
Gmina Łubniany	rural	125.4	9,830	Łubniany
Gmina Tarnów Opolski	rural	81.6	9,580	Tarnów Opolski
Gmina Dobrzeń Wielki	rural	91.4	9,457	Dobrzeń Wielki
Gmina Komprachcice	rural	55.9	9,108	Komprachcice
Gmina Prószków	urban-rural	121.2	9,029	Prószków
Gmina Dąbrowa	rural	130.8	8,231	Dąbrowa
Gmina Popielów	rural	175.6	8,051	Popielów
Gmina Chrząstowice	rural	82.3	6,948	Chrząstowice
Gmina Murów	rural	159.7	5,306	Murów
Gmina Tułowice	urban-rural	81.1	5,172	Tułowice
