= Blaut =

Blaut is a surname. Notable people with the surname include:

- Bernard Blaut (1940–2007), Polish footballer
- James Morris Blaut (1927–2000), American professor of anthropology
- Zygfryd Blaut (1943–2005), Polish footballer
