= Gogolin Formation =

System	Series	Stage	Age (Ma)	European lithostratigraphy
Jurassic	Lower	Hettangian	younger	Lias
Triassic	Upper	Rhaetian	201.4–208.5	Lias
Triassic	Upper	Rhaetian	201.4–208.5	Keuper
Triassic	Upper	Norian	208.5–227.0	Keuper
Triassic	Upper	Carnian	227.0–237.0	Keuper
Triassic	Middle	Ladinian	237.0–242.0	Keuper
Triassic	Middle	Ladinian	237.0–242.0	Muschelkalk
Triassic	Middle	Anisian	242.0–247.2	Muschelkalk
Triassic	Middle	Anisian	242.0–247.2	Bunter or Buntsandstein
Triassic	Lower	Olenekian	247.2–251.2	Bunter or Buntsandstein
Triassic	Lower	Induan	251.2–251.9	Bunter or Buntsandstein
Permian	Lopingian	Changhsingian	older	Bunter or Buntsandstein
Permian	Lopingian	Changhsingian	older	Zechstein
Major lithostratigraphic units of northwest Europe with the ICS's geologic timescale of the Triassic.

Gogolin Formation – Triassic geologic formation, hitherto named the Gogolin Beds, is the lowermost lithostratigraphical unit of the Lower Muschelkalk in the Silesian-Cracow Upland (S Poland, Central Europe), underlain by the Upper Buntsandstein (Lower Triassic) carbonates and overlain by the Górażdże Formation (Middle Triassic) carbonates.

== Name ==
Historical name coming from Gogolin, a small town in south Poland, where the Gogolin Formation was described for the first time, and where the main stratotypes have been exposed (see section Stratotypes).

Gogolin
- Town
- Location within Poland
- Coordinates: 50°29′N 18°02′E
- Country: Poland
- Voivodeship: Opole
- County: Krapkowice
- Gmina: Gogolin

== Age ==
The Late Olenekian or Early Aegean (Anisian) to Pelsonian (Anisian).

== Rocks ==
The formation is built of various carbonates which were deposited on a carbonate ramp.

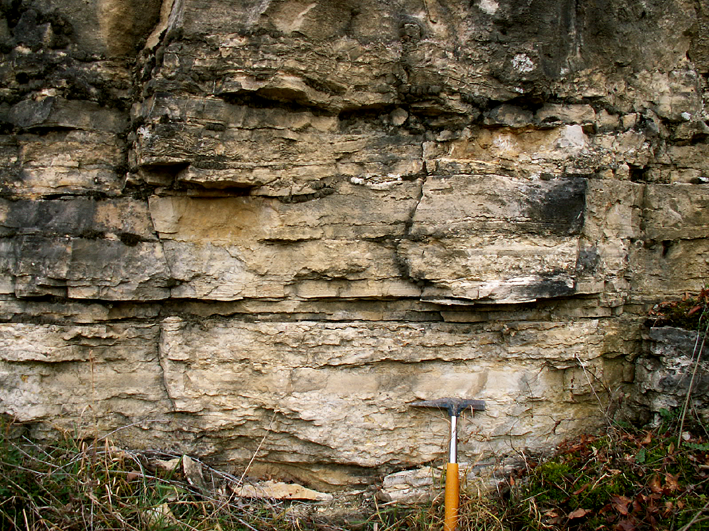
The lowermost part of the Gogolin Formation – Gogolin, S Poland

== Subdivision ==
This Formation has recently been divided into four members, six beds, and two horizons:

1. Zakrzów Crinoidal Limestone Member, which includes: a) Krapkowice Pelitic Limestone Bed – thin-bedded, wavy bedded and marly micritic limestones, b) Dąbrówka Bioclastic Limestone Bed – thick- to medium-bedded, cross-bedded crinoidal limestones, c) Podbór Bioclastic Limestone Bed – thin- to medium-bedded, graded, horizontally and cross-bedded bioclastic limestones and wavy-bedded micritic limestones;
2. The Skała Marl Member – marls interbedded with micritic and bioclastic limestones; the lowermost part of this member is locally built of broken-up limestone beds and lumps which are covered by an intraformational conglomerate with small intraclasts – they are divided as Kocina Intraformational Conglomerate Bed;
3. The Emilówka Cellular Limestone Member, which includes: a) Karłubiec Bioclastic Limestone Bed – massive, cross-bedded, thin- to medium-bedded bioclastic and micritic limestones, b) Otmęt Marly Limestone Bed – strongly porous, thin-bedded marly limestones that are, in fact, dedolomitized dolomites;
4. Odrowąż marly limestone horizon – marls, thin- to medium-bedded, graded, cross-bedded and horizontally bedded bioclastic limestones and thin layers of platy and wavy bedded micritic limestones;
5. Malnia limestone horizon – thin- to medium-bedded, graded, horizontally and cross-bedded bioclastic limestones, thin-bedded, platy and wavy-bedded micritic limestones;
6. Ligota Hill Wavy-Bedded Limestone Member – wavy-bedded and crumpled micritic limestones intercalated with medium- to thin-bedded, graded, cross- and horizontally bedded, bioclastic limestones.

== Stratotypes ==
Stratotypes are located at Gogolin and its vicinity, Błotnica Strzelecka and Ligota Dolna (southern Poland).

== Literature ==
- Assmann P., 1913 – Beitrag zur Kenntniss der Stratigraphie des oberschlesischen Muschelkalks. Jb. Preuss. Geol. Landesanst., 34: 658 – 671, Berlin.
- Assmann P., 1944. Die Stratigraphie der oberschlesischen Trias. Teil 2: Der Muschelkalk. Abhandlungen des Reichsamtes für Bodenforschung, Neue Folge, 208: 1–124.
- Kowal-Linka M. 2008. Formalizacja litostratygrafii formacji gogolińskiej (trias środkowy) na Śląsku Opolskim. Geologos 14 (2): 125–161 (and the references; the paper in Polish with English summary).
- Kowal-Linka M. 2009. Nowe jednostki litostratygraficzne w randze warstw w obrębie formacji gogolińskiej (trias środkowy) na Śląsku Opolskim. Geologia 35 (2): 153-174 (and the references; the paper in Polish with English summary).
- Kowal-Linka, M., Stawikowski, W., 2013. Garnet and tourmaline as provenance indicators of terrigenous material in epicontinental carbonates (Middle Triassic, S Poland), 291: 27–47.
- Nawrocki, J.; Szulc, J. (2000). "The Middle Triassic magnetostratigraphy from the Peri-Tethys basin in Poland". Earth and Planetary Science Letters. 182: 77–92. doi:10.1016/s0012-821x(00)00230-2.
- Niedźwiedzki R., 2000: Litostratygrafia formacji górażdżańskiej i formacji dziewkowickiej na Śląsku Opolskim. Prace Geologiczno-Mineralogiczne, 71, 1–72 (and the references; the paper in Polish with English summary).
- Zawidzka, K (1975). "Conodont stratigraphy and sedimentary environment of the Muschelkalk in Upper Silesia". Acta Geologica Polonica. 25: 217–256.
