= Vikantice =

- Municipality
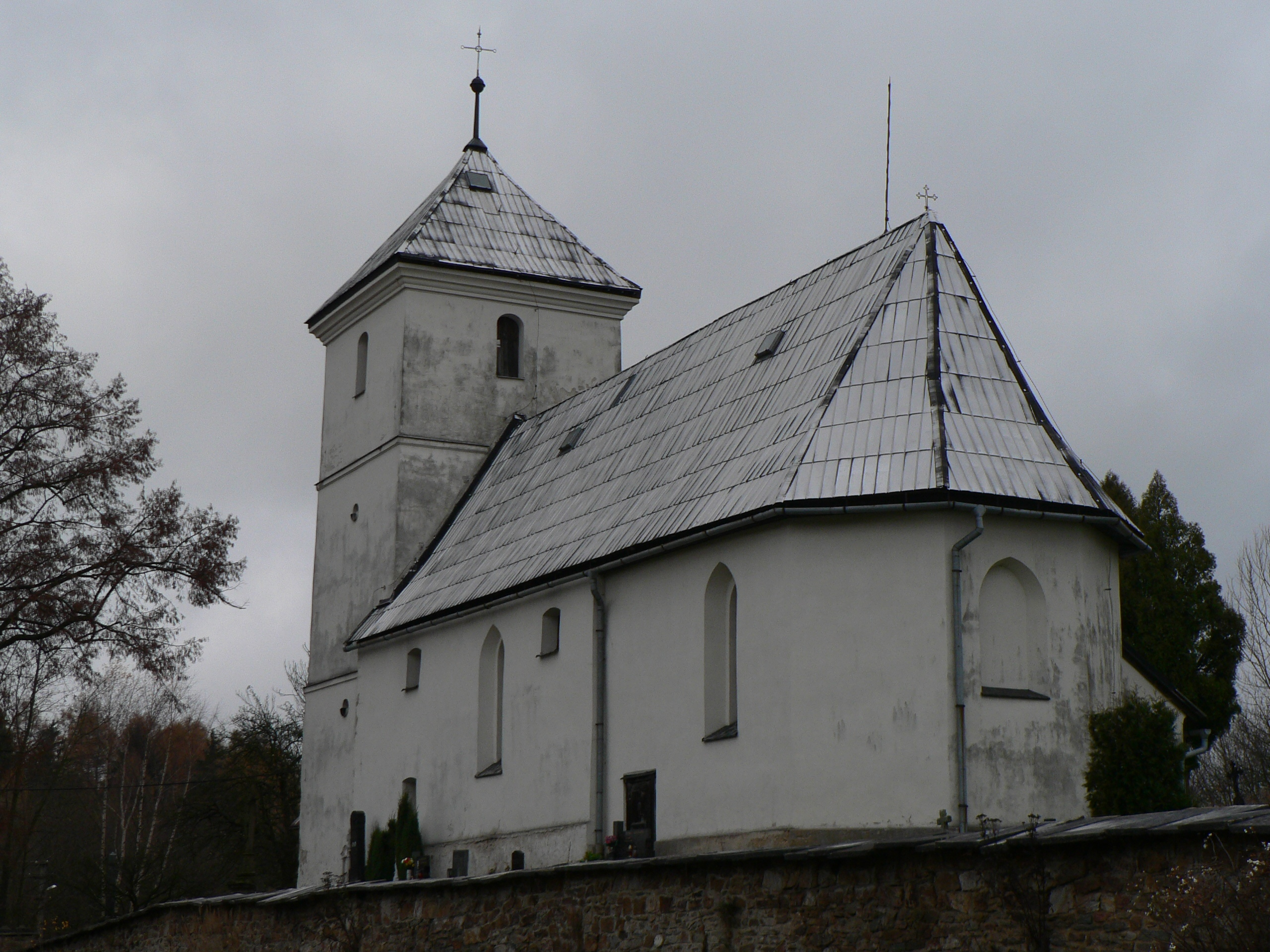
- Church of Saint Wolfgang

- Location in the Czech Republic
- Coordinates: 50°8′10″N 16°59′34″E
- Country: Czech Republic
- Region: Olomouc
- District: Šumperk
- First mentioned: 1437

Area
  - Total: 10.04 km^{2} (3.88 sq mi)
- Elevation: 613 m (2,011 ft)

Population (2026-01-01)
  - Total: 66
  - Density: 6.6/km^{2} (17/sq mi)
- Time zone: UTC+1 (CET)
  - Summer (DST): UTC+2 (CEST)
- Postal codes: 788 25
- Website: www.obecvikantice.cz

Vikantice (German: Weigelsdorf) is a municipality and village in Šumperk District in the Olomouc Region of the Czech Republic. It has about 70 inhabitants.

Vikantice lies approximately 19 kilometres (12 mi) north of Šumperk, 63 km (39 mi) north of Olomouc, and 184 km (114 mi) east of Prague.

== History ==
The first written mention of Vikantice is from 1437.

During World War II, the German occupiers operated a forced labour subcamp of the Stalag VIII-B/344 prisoner-of-war camp at a local paper mill. 120 Allied POWs were imprisoned there.

== Demographics ==
Historical population
| Year | Pop. | ±% |
|---|---|---|
| 1869 | 524 | — |
| 1880 | 609 | +16.2% |
| 1890 | 675 | +10.8% |
| 1900 | 684 | +1.3% |
| 1910 | 765 | +11.8% |
| 1921 | 809 | +5.8% |
| 1930 | 861 | +6.4% |
| 1950 | 339 | −60.6% |
| 1961 | 161 | −52.5% |
| 1970 | 188 | +16.8% |
| 1980 | 126 | −33.0% |
| 1991 | 120 | −4.8% |
| 2001 | 103 | −14.2% |
| 2011 | 69 | −33.0% |
| 2021 | 78 | +13.0% |
Source: Censuses
