= Gogolin =

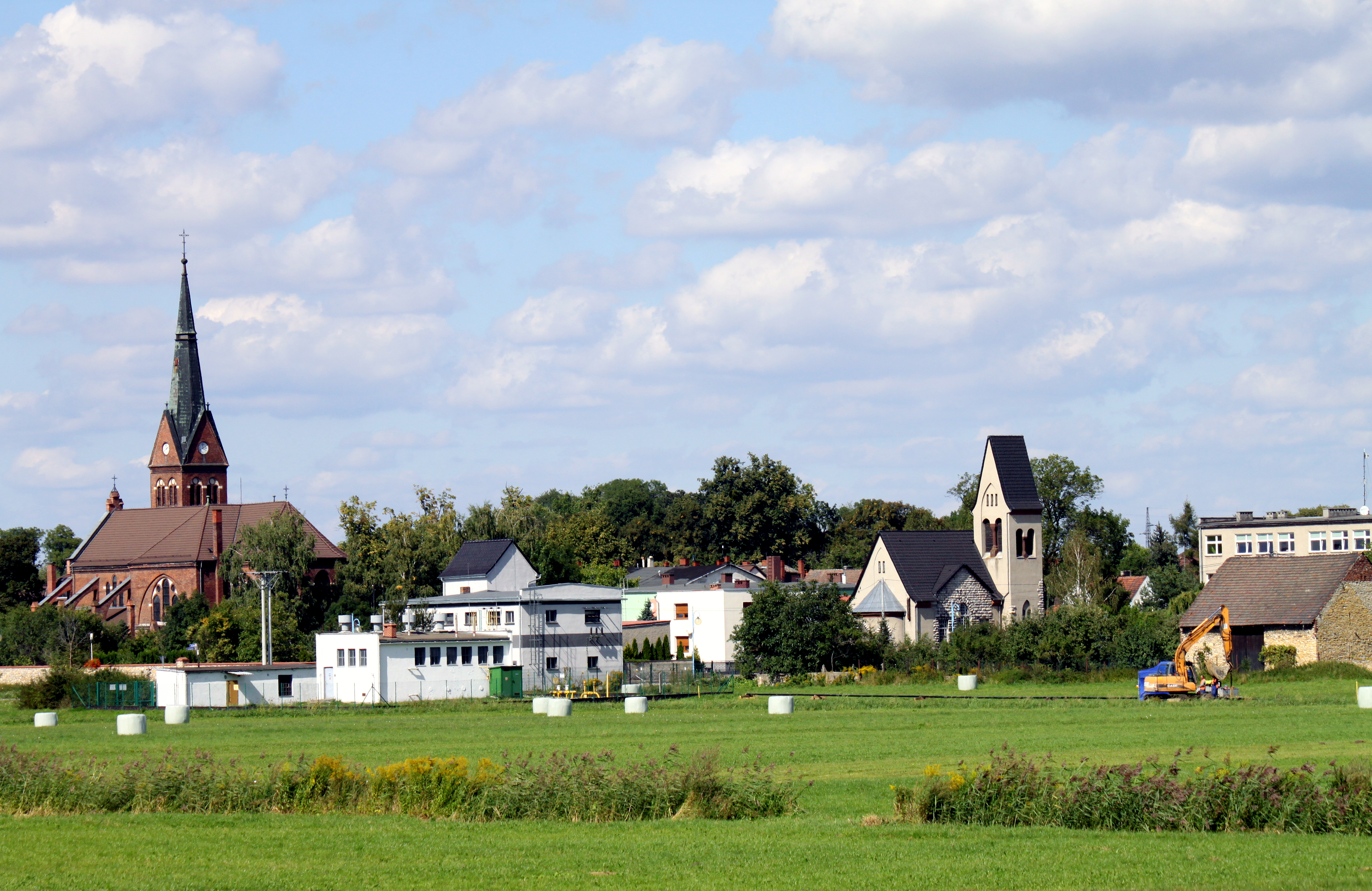

- Flag Coat of arms

- Location within Poland
- Coordinates: 50°29′17″N 18°1′26″E
- Country: Poland
- Voivodeship: Opole
- County: Krapkowice
- Gmina: Gogolin
- First mentioned: 1223
- Town rights: 1967

Area
  - Total: 20.35 km^{2} (7.86 sq mi)

Population (2019-06-30)
  - Total: 6,682
  - Density: 328.4/km^{2} (850.4/sq mi)
- Time zone: UTC+1 (CET)
  - Summer (DST): UTC+2 (CEST)
- Postal code: 47-320
- Vehicle registration: OKR
- Website: http://gogolin.pl

Gogolin [ɡɔˈɡɔlʲin] is a town in southern Poland, in Opole Voivodeship, in Krapkowice County. It has 6,682 inhabitants (2019). It is the seat of Gmina Gogolin.

== Geology and palaeontology ==
Gogolin gives its name to the Gogolin Formation whose strata were first exposed here.

== History ==
Historic churches of Gogolin

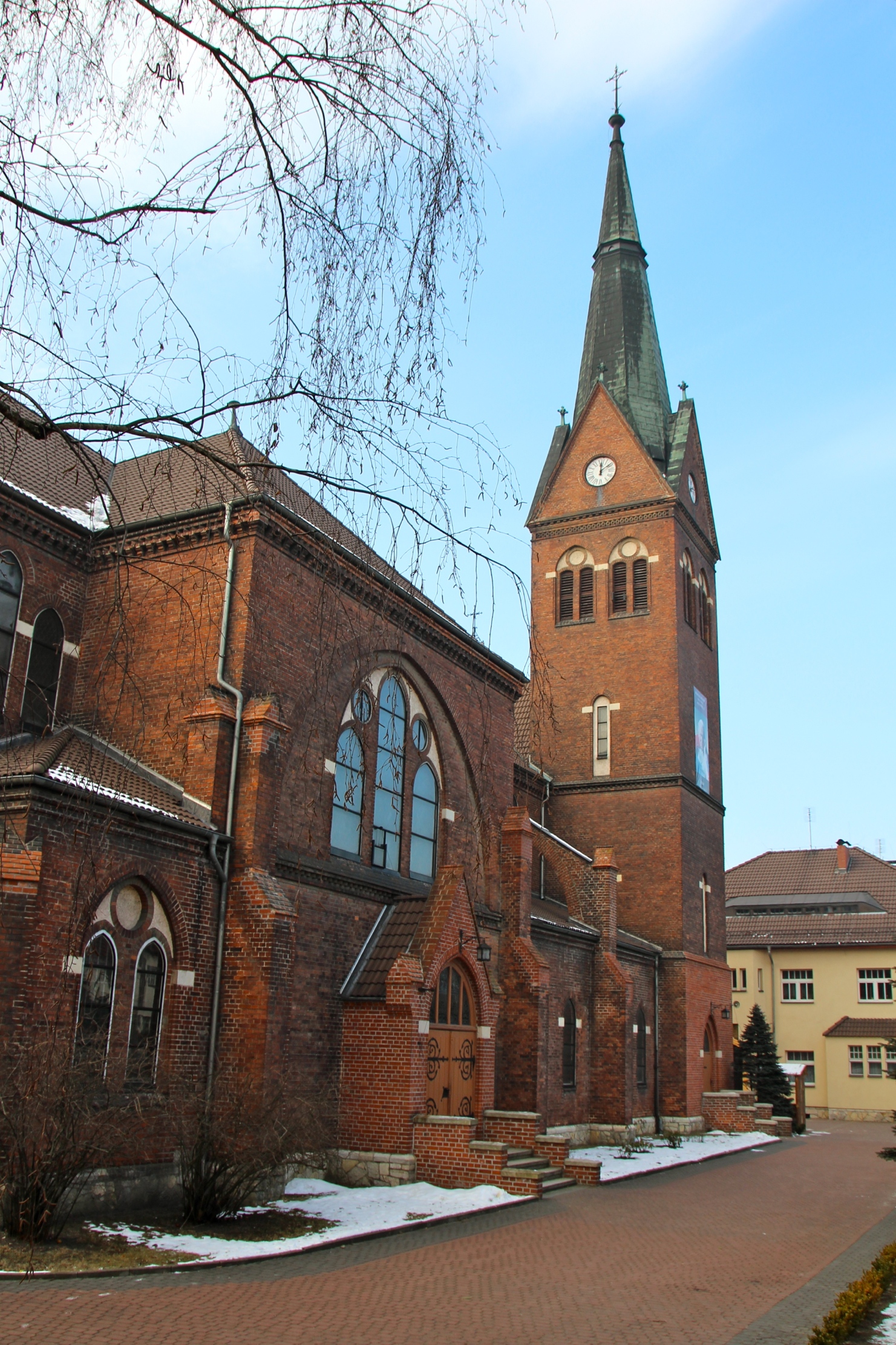
Catholic Sacred Heart church

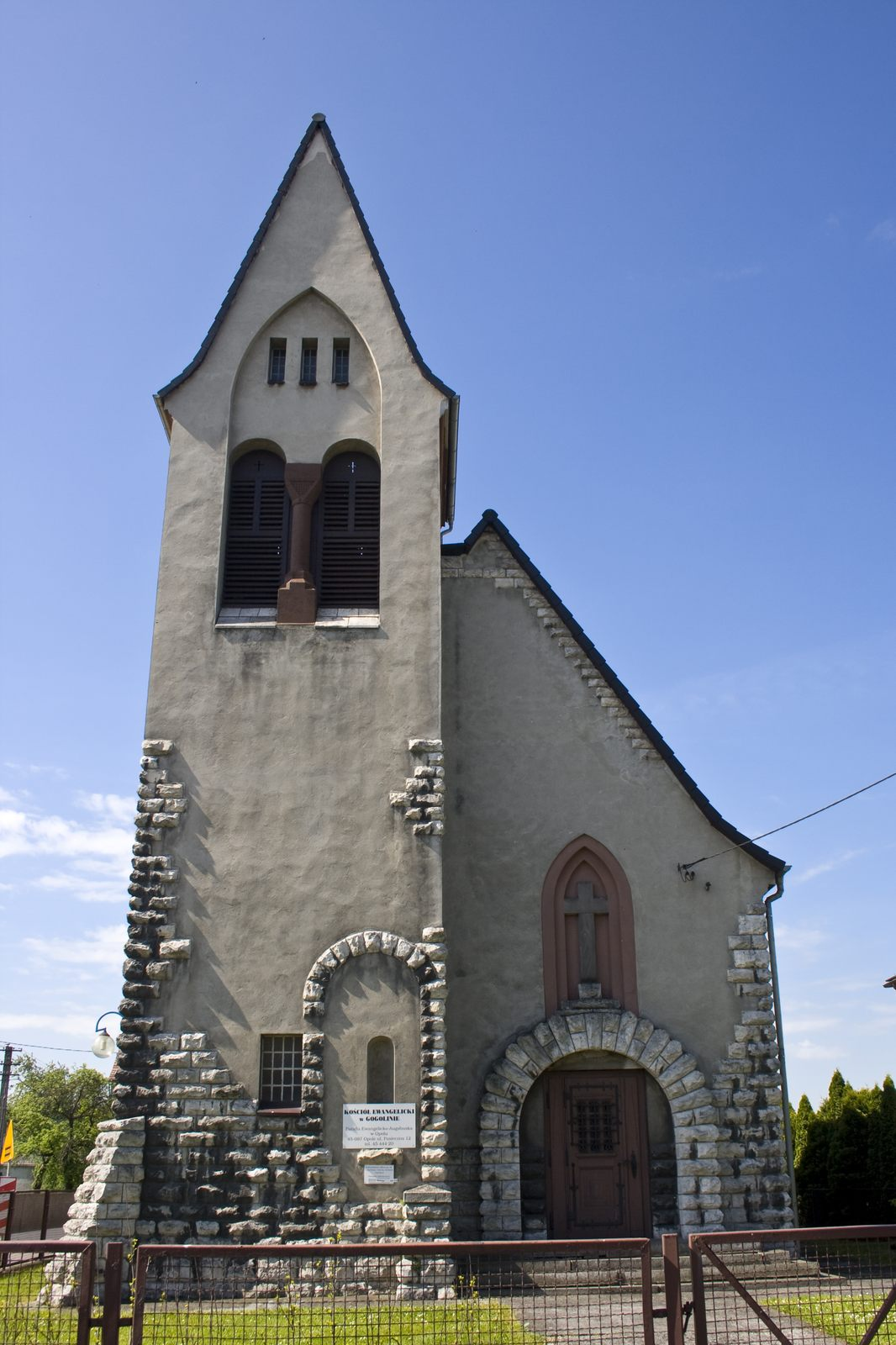
Lutheran Church

The oldest known mention of Gogolin, under its Old Polish name Gogolino, comes from a 1223 document of Wawrzyniec, bishop of Wrocław. It was then part of fragmented Piast-ruled Poland. Later on, it was also part of Bohemia (Czechia), then along with Bohemia it was under Austrian rule, before it was annexed by Prussia in the 18th century, and then became part of the German Empire in 1871. Administratively, Gogolin was located in the Province of Silesia from 1815 until 1919, and then the Province of Upper Silesia until 1945. It was one of the few places whose original Polish name has never been Germanized.

In the 19th century, the exploitation of local limestone deposits began on an industrial scale, and the first lime kilns were built. Also a train station was built, and Gogolin enjoyed railway connections with Opole (then Germanized as Oppeln), Kędzierzyn (Kandrzin), and Prudnik. Heavy fights of the Silesian Uprisings took place nearby in 1921. At the Upper Silesia plebiscite of 20 March 1921, there were 1,262 votes for remaining in Germany and 955 for being reintegrated with Poland which just regained independence. In the event, the town remained in the Weimar Republic. During World War II the Germans established a forced labour camp for Poles and Jews and two labour camps (E131 and E132) of the Stalag VIII-B/344 prisoner-of-war camp for Allied POWs at Łambinowice. About 30 buildings were destroyed in the final stages of the war in 1945.

The Potsdam Conference of 1945 defined the Oder-Neisse line as the border between Poland and newly formed East Germany, pending a peace conference with Germany which never took place, and Gogolin became again part of Poland.

A high school was established in 1948, and in 1967 Gogolin was granted town rights.

The town is known for its old regional folk song Poszła Karolinka do Gogolina, which is a symbol regional Polish traditions. The song's characters of Karolinka and Karlik are depicted in the town's coat of arms, along with a lime kiln, alluding to the town's traditions. There is also a monument of Karolinka and Karlik in the town centre.

== Population ==
Population in 1782–2005.

Year	Population
1783	312
1830	515
1844	790
1855	1,362
1861	1,533
1885	2,789
1900	3,218

Year	Population
1910	3,280
1933	4,132
1939	5,073
1980	6,000
1995	6,635
2000	6,383
2005	6,045

== Twin towns – sister cities ==
See twin towns of Gmina Gogolin.

== Notable people ==
- Bernard Blaut (1940–2007), football player and coach, capped 36 times for the Poland national football team
- Zygfryd Blaut (1943–2005), football player and coach, capped one time for the Poland national football team

== Gallery ==
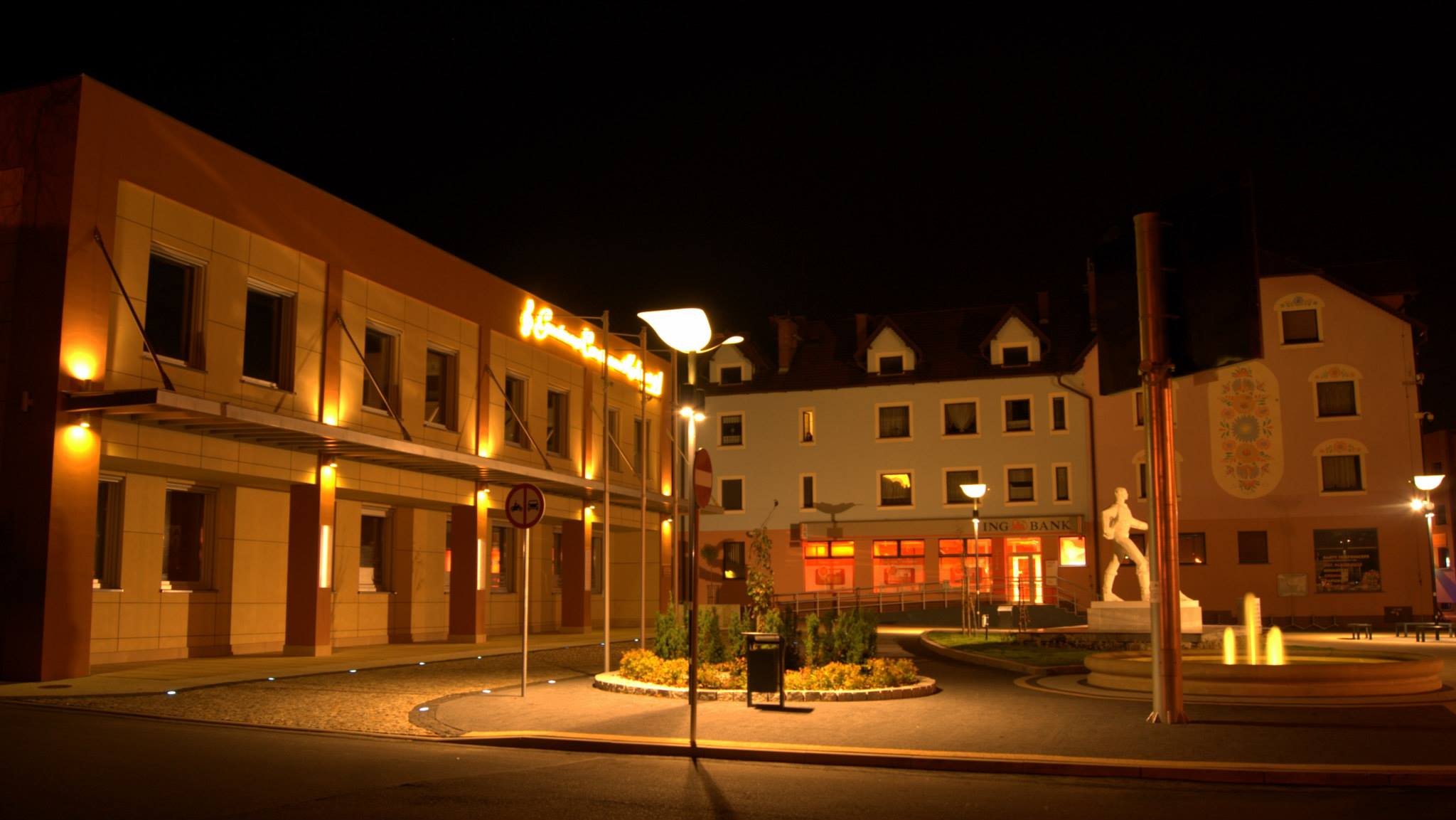
Town center at night with the culture centre on the left

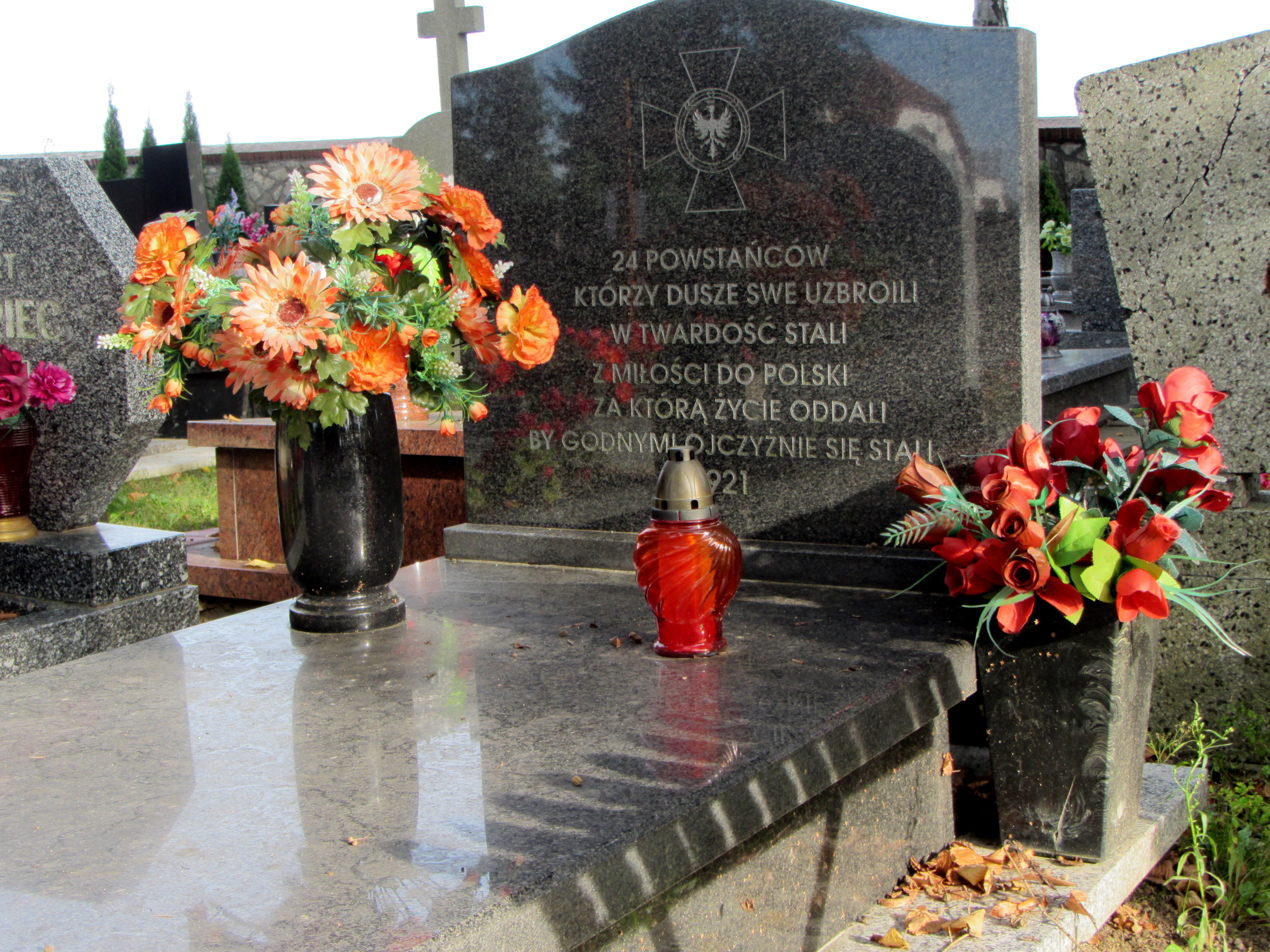
Mass grave of Polish insurgents of 1921

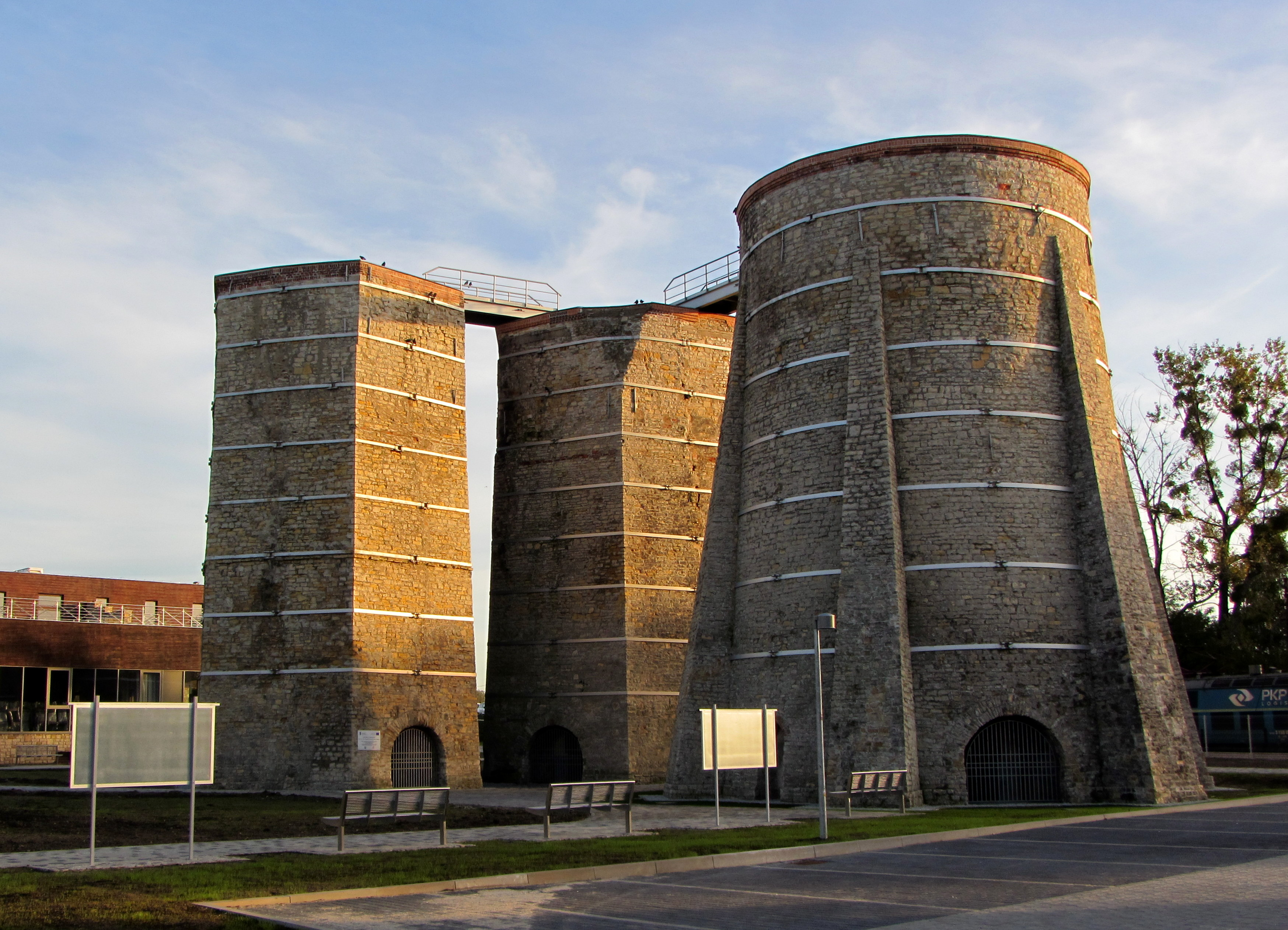
Old lime kilns

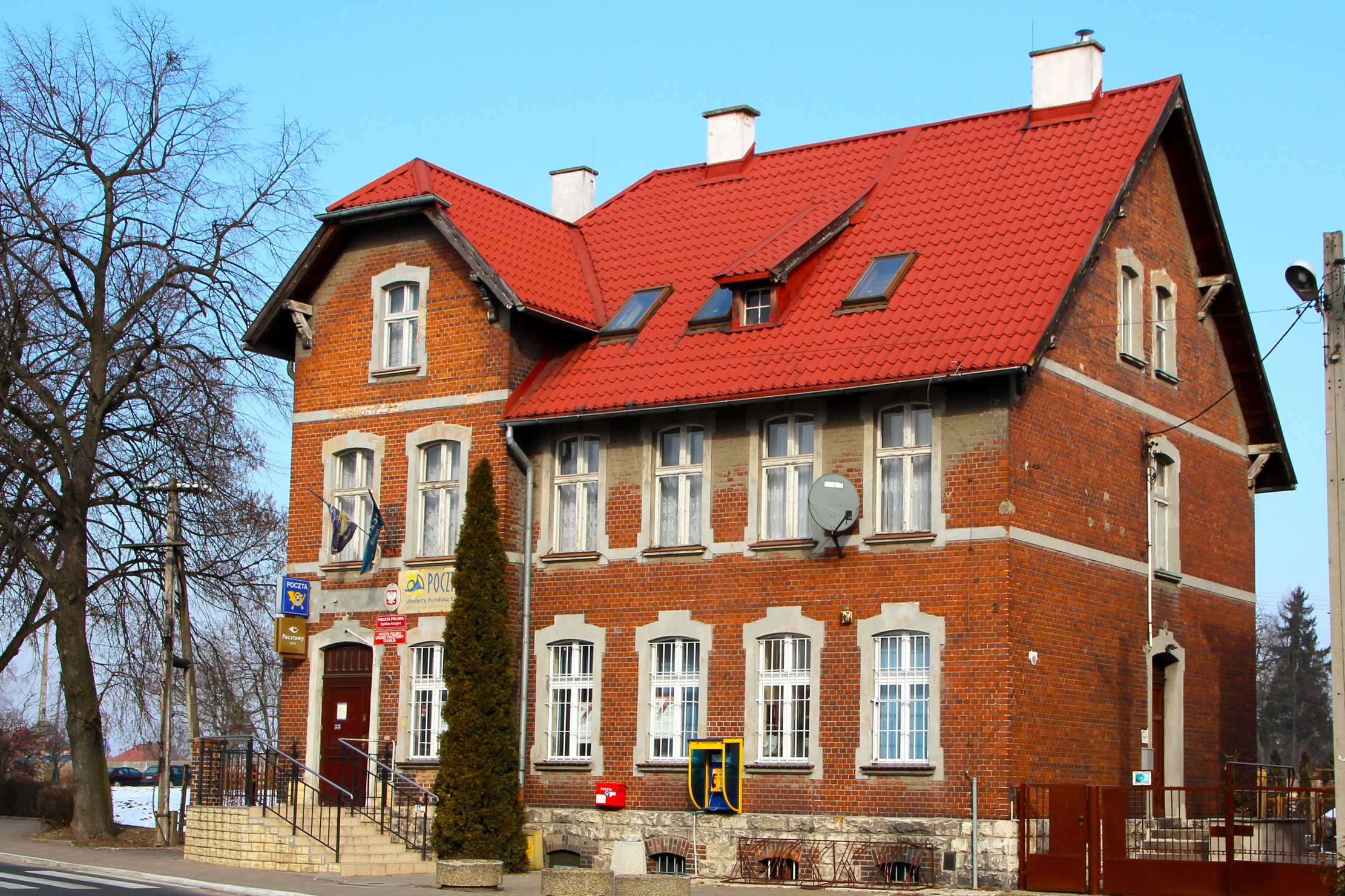
Polish Post office

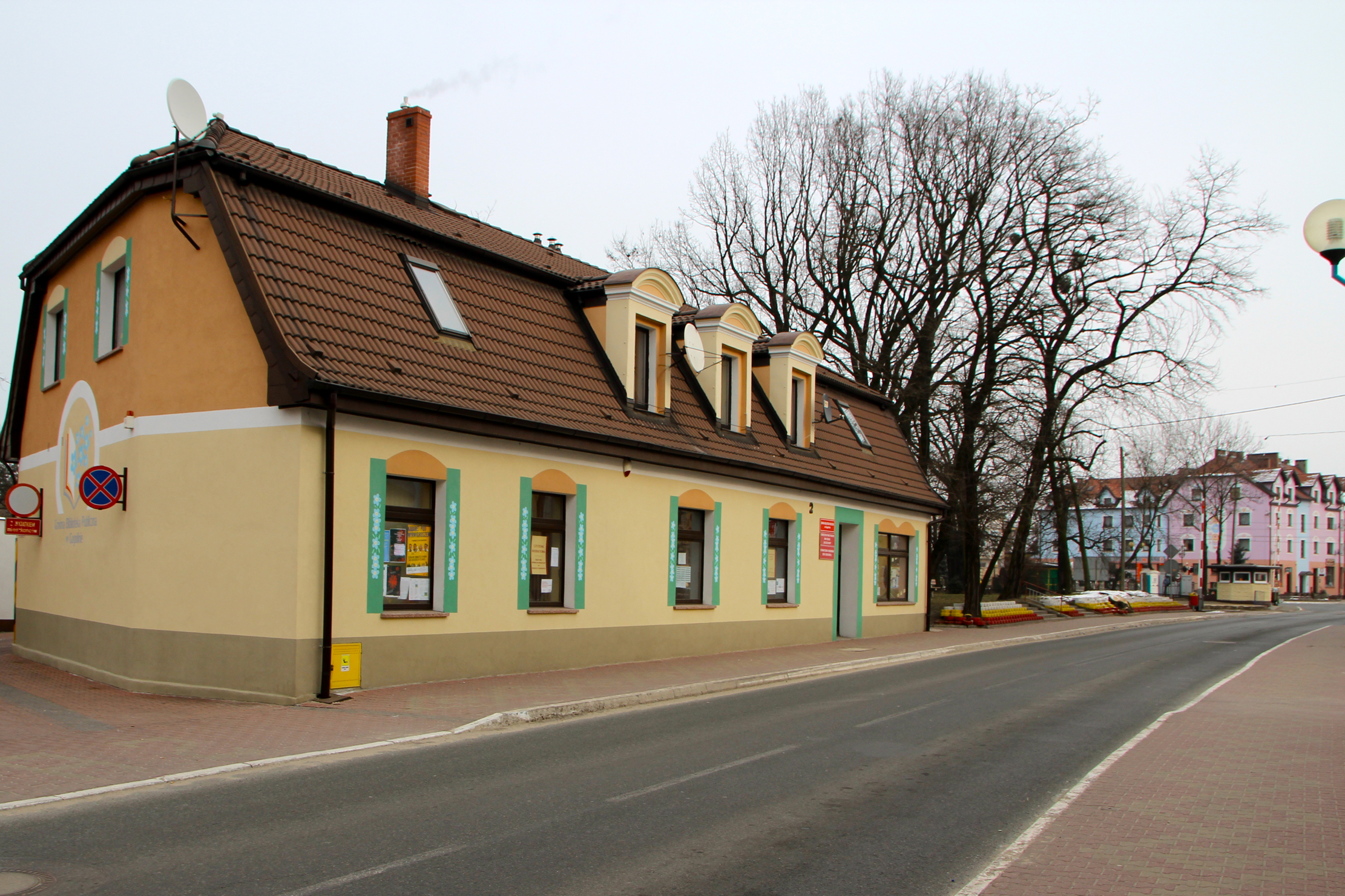
Municipal library

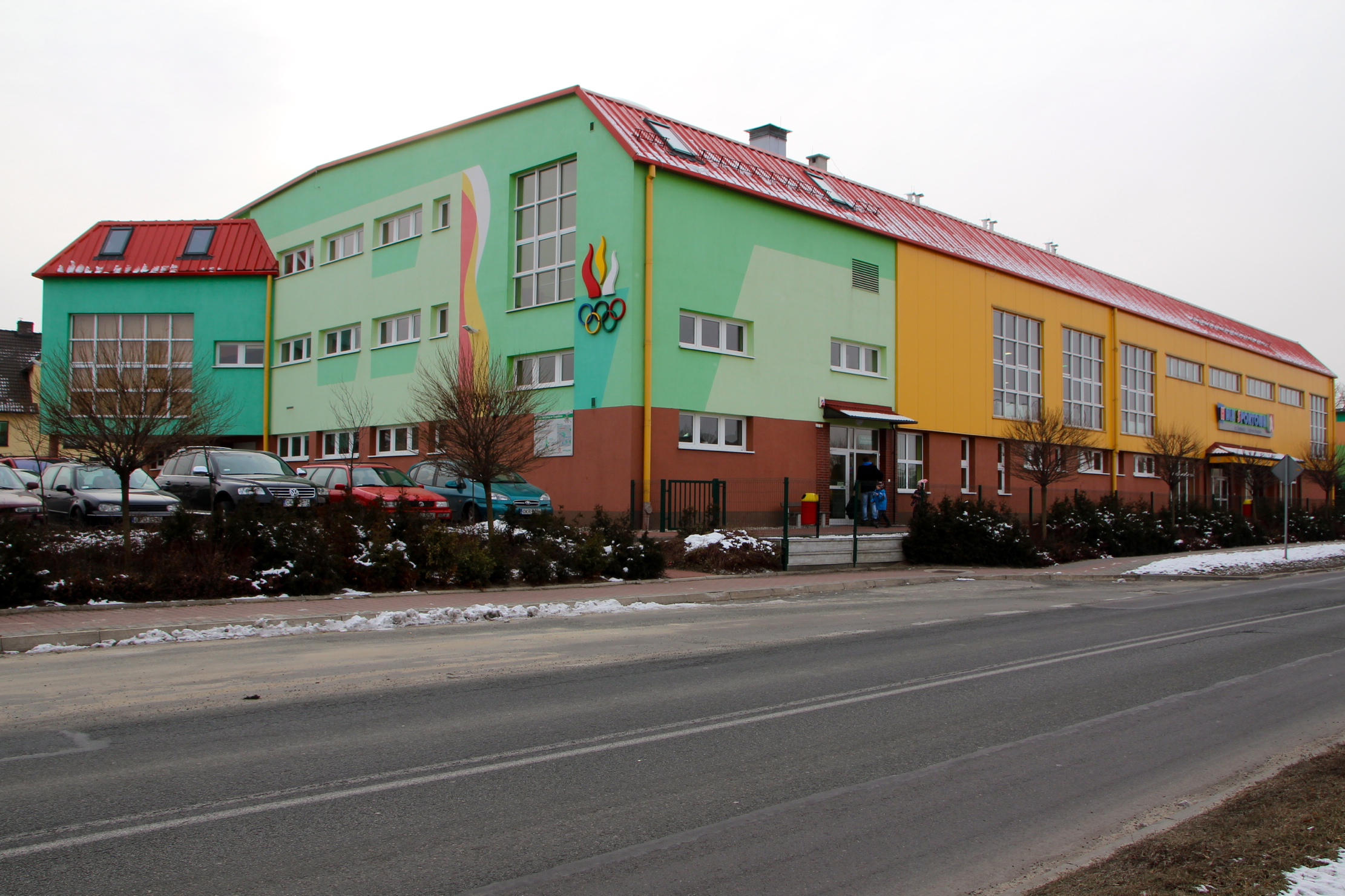
Indoor sports hall
