= Górażdże =

Górażdże Goradze
- Village
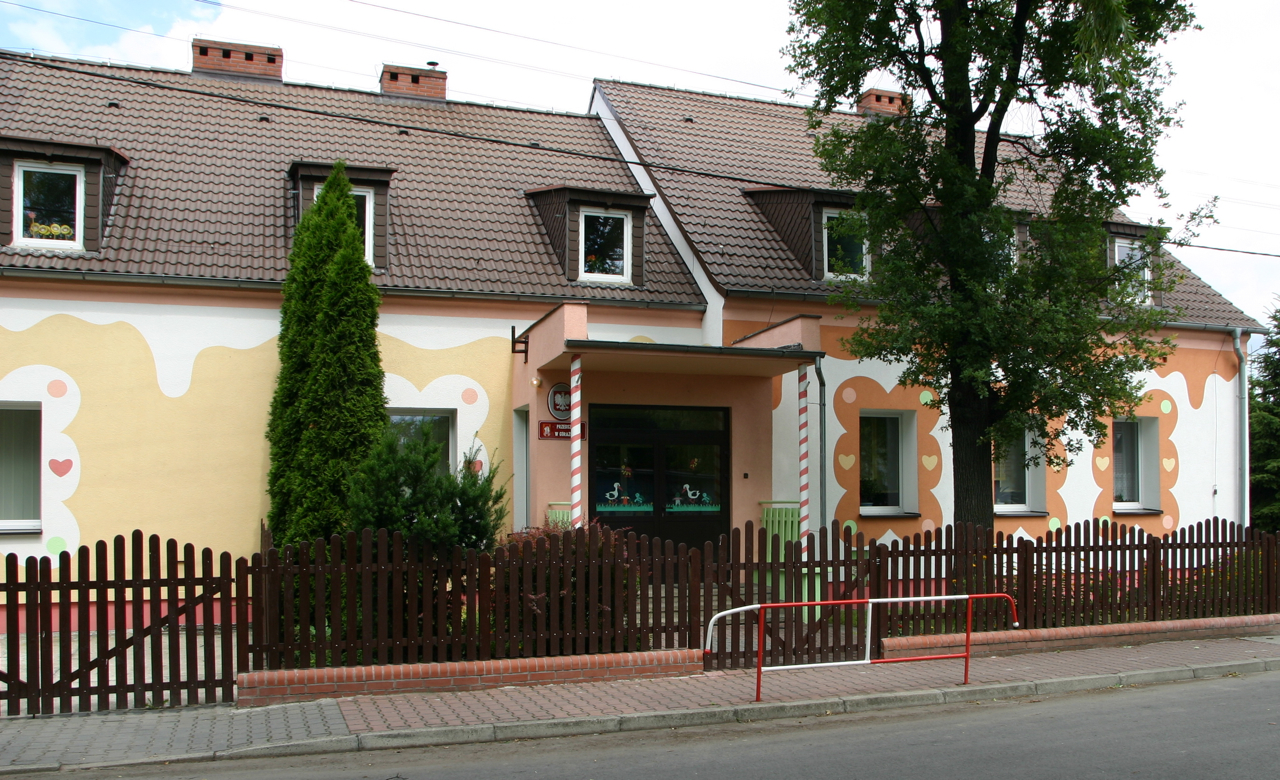
- Preschool in Górażdże

- Location within Poland
- Coordinates: 50°32′N 18°1′E
- Country: Poland
- Voivodeship: Opole
- County: Krapkowice
- Gmina: Gogolin

Population
  - Total: 1,100
- Time zone: UTC+1 (CET)
  - Summer (DST): UTC+2 (CEST)
- Postal code: 47-316
- Vehicle registration: OKR

Górażdże ([ɡuˈraʐd͡ʐɛ], additional name in German: Goradze) is a village in the administrative district of Gmina Gogolin, within Krapkowice County, Opole Voivodeship, in southern Poland.

== History ==
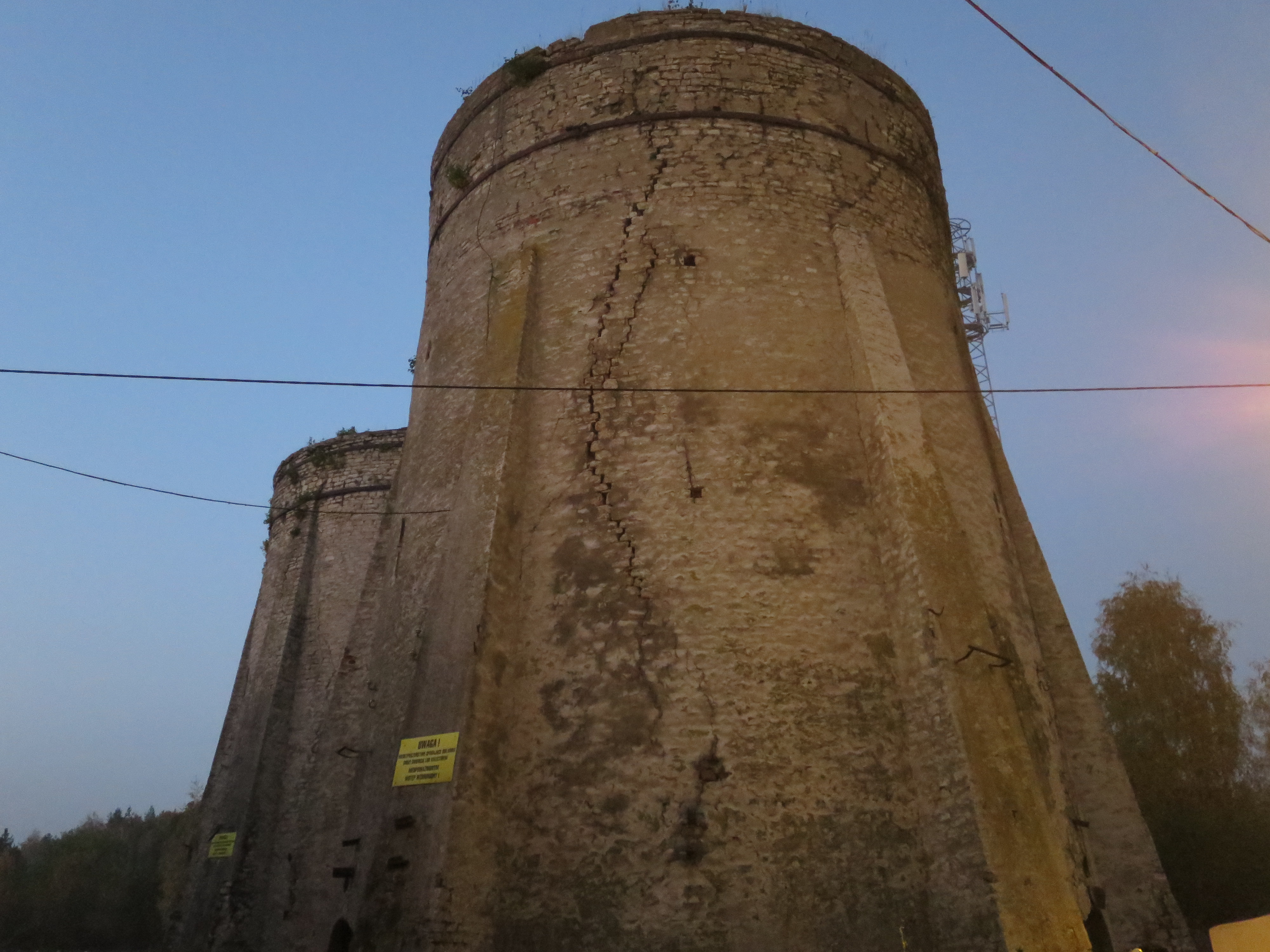
Old lime kilns

In the 10th century the area became part of the emerging Polish state, and later on, it was part of Poland, Bohemia (Czechia), Prussia, and Germany. In 1934, during a massive Nazi campaign of renaming of placenames, the village was renamed to Waldenstein to erase traces of Polish origin. During World War II, the Germans operated the E152 and E372 forced labour subcamps of the Stalag VIII-B/344 prisoner-of-war camp in the village. After the defeat of Germany in the war, in 1945, the village became again part of Poland and its historic name was restored.

In the 1960s the quarries were expanded in the area due to the increase of the lime production and starting a new lime plant in 1966. In of 1973-1977 a new cement plant (the Górażdże Cement Plant) was built in the nearby village of Chorula, which was one of the largest and technologically advanced in Poland at the time. Currently it is still operated and is part of the Górażdże Group S.A. which is the Polish leader in the cement, concrete, and aggregates production.

== Transport ==
There is a train station in the village, and the Polish A4 motorway runs nearby, southwest of the village.

== Notable people ==
- Mateusz Gucman (born 1980), Polish Olympic wrestler
