= Obrowiec, Opole Voivodeship =

Obrowiec Oberwitz
- Village
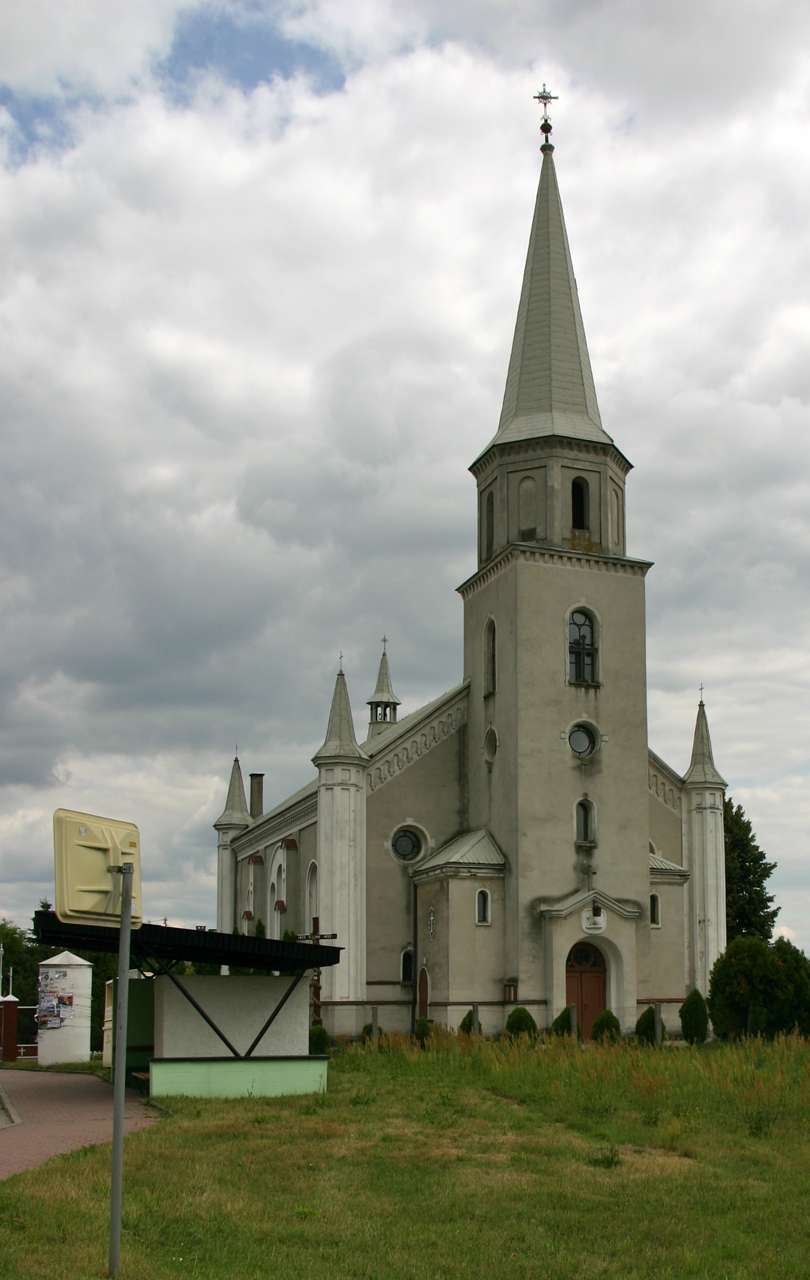
- Church of Saint John the Baptist

- Location within Poland
- Coordinates: 50°27′N 18°1′E
- Country: Poland
- Voivodeship: Opole
- County: Krapkowice
- Gmina: Gogolin
- Postal code: 47-320

Obrowiec ([ɔˈbrɔvjɛt͡s], additional name in German: Oberwitz) is a village in the administrative district of Gmina Gogolin, within Krapkowice County, Opole Voivodeship, in southtern Poland.
