= Kamionek, Opole Voivodeship =

Kamionek Klein Stein
- Village
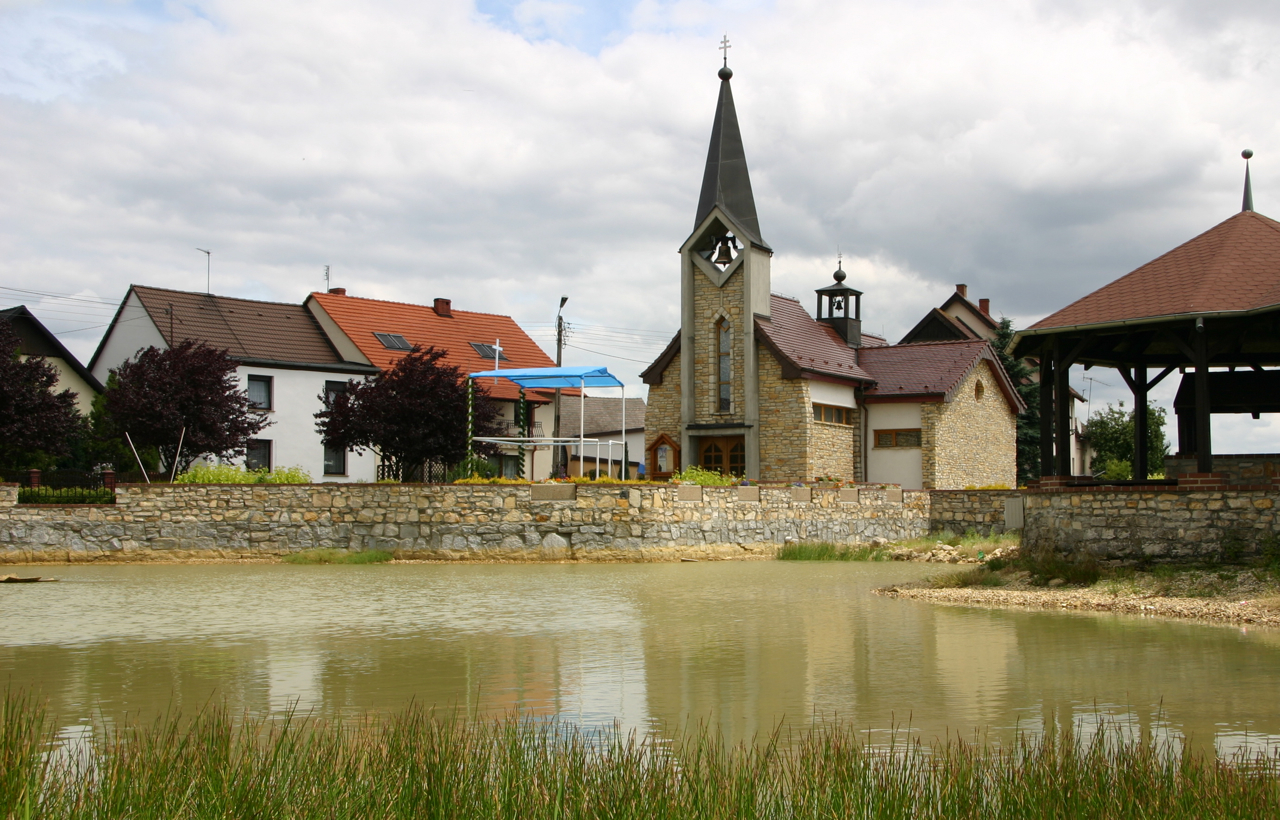

- Location within Poland
- Coordinates: 50°31′38″N 18°3′49″E
- Country: Poland
- Voivodeship: Opole
- County: Krapkowice
- Gmina: Gogolin

Population
  - Total: 664
- Postal code: 47-325
- Website: http://www.kamionek.pl/

Kamionek ([kaˈmjɔnɛk], additional name in German: Klein Stein) is a village in the administrative district of Gmina Gogolin, within Krapkowice County, Opole Voivodeship, in southern Poland.
