= Zakrzów, Krapkowice County =

Zakrzów Sakrau
- Village
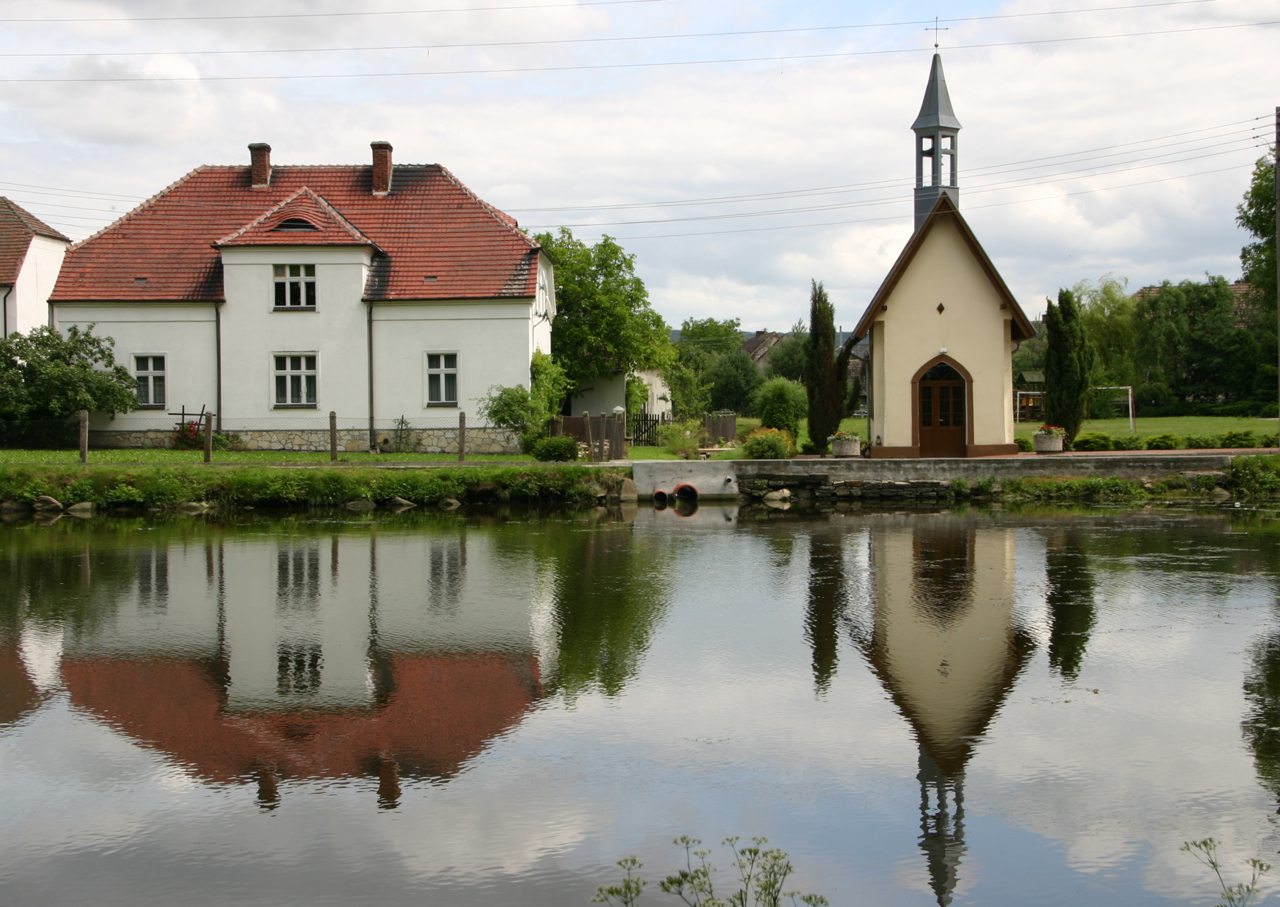

- Location within Poland
- Coordinates: 50°28′52″N 18°05′07″E
- Country: Poland
- Voivodeship: Opole
- County: Krapkowice
- Gmina: Gogolin
- First mentioned: 14th century
- Time zone: UTC+1 (CET)
  - Summer (DST): UTC+2 (CEST)
- Postal code: 47-330
- Vehicle registration: OKR

Zakrzów ([ˈzakʂuf], additional name in German: Sakrau) is a village in the administrative district of Gmina Gogolin, within Krapkowice County, Opole Voivodeship, in southern Poland.

== History ==
The oldest known mention of Zakrzów dates back to the 14th century. Its name is of Polish origin and means "za krzem" ("behind the bush").

From 1871 to 1945 the area was part of Germany. During World War II, the Germans established and operated two forced labour camps for Jews, both men and women, in the village, and two labour camps (E93 and E435) of the Stalag VIII-B/344 prisoner-of-war camp for Allied POWs.
