= Odrowąż, Opole Voivodeship =

Odrowąż Oderwanz
- Village
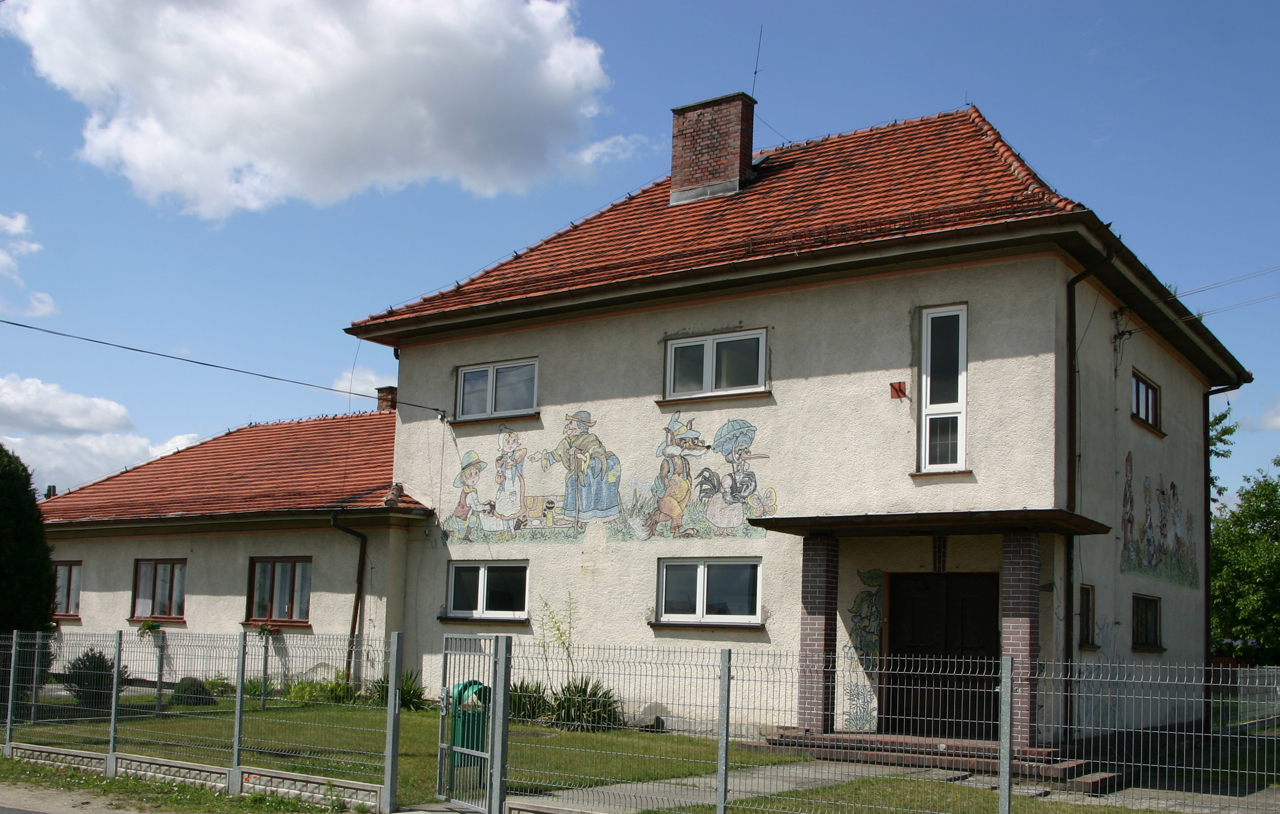
- House

- Location within Poland
- Coordinates: 50°30′N 17°57′E
- Country: Poland
- Voivodeship: Opole
- County: Krapkowice
- Gmina: Gogolin

Population
  - Total: 546
- Postal code: 47-316

Odrowąż ([ɔˈdrɔvɔ̃ʂ], additional name in German: Oderwanz) is a village in the administrative district of Gmina Gogolin, within Krapkowice County, Opole Voivodeship, in southern Poland.

== Gallery ==
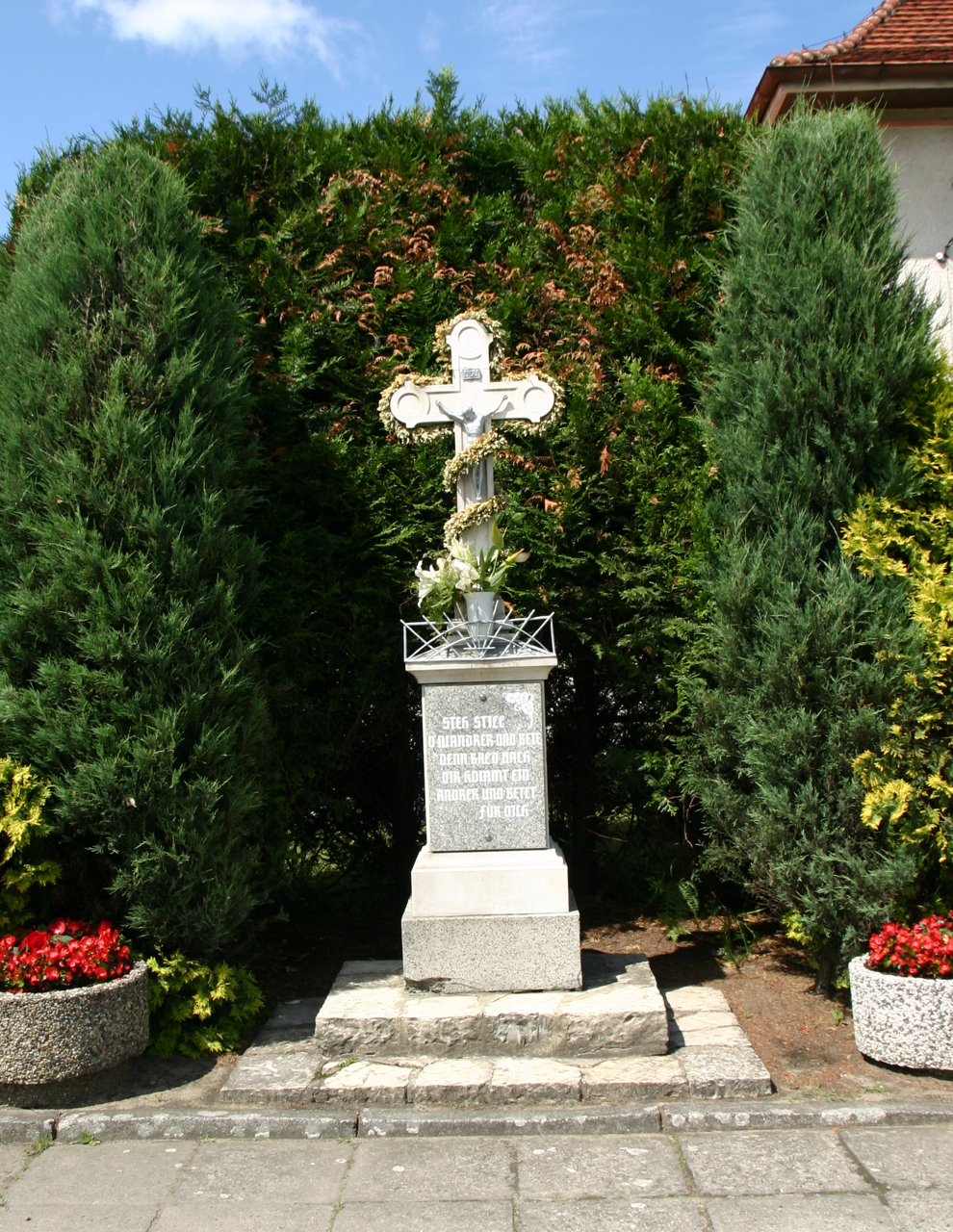
Wayside shrine

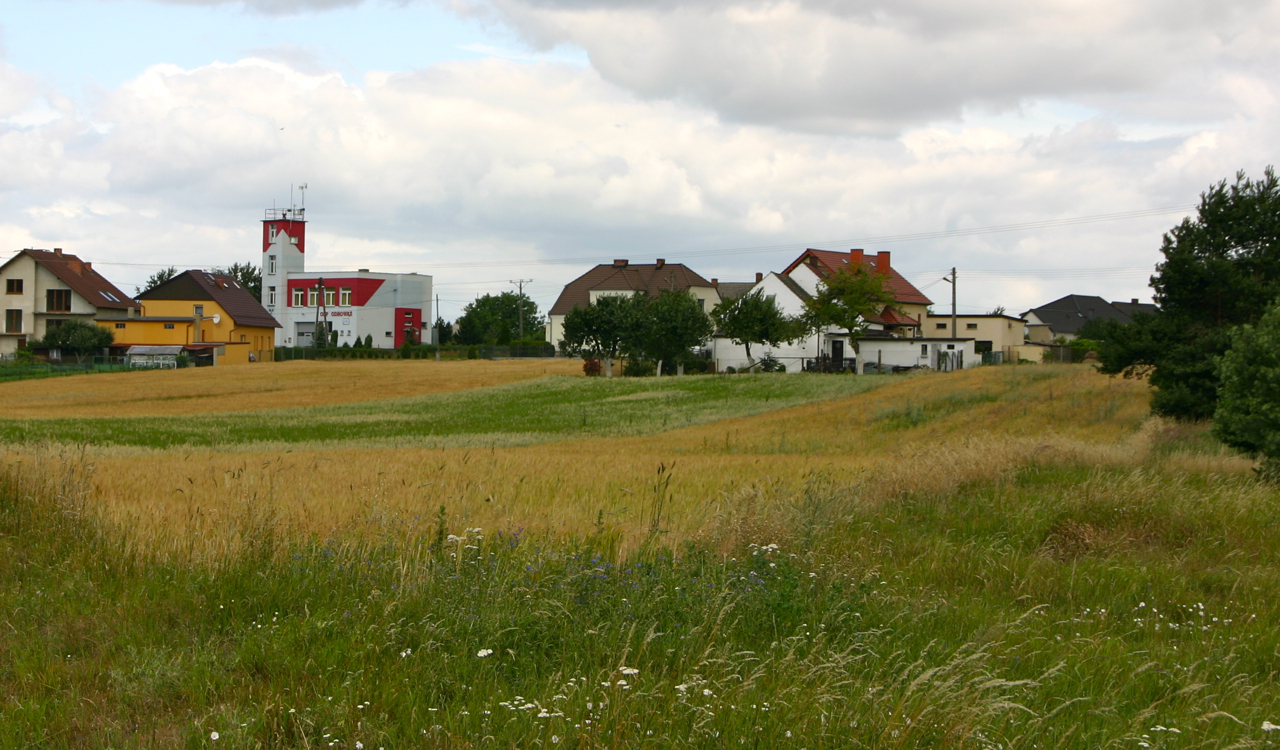
Houses

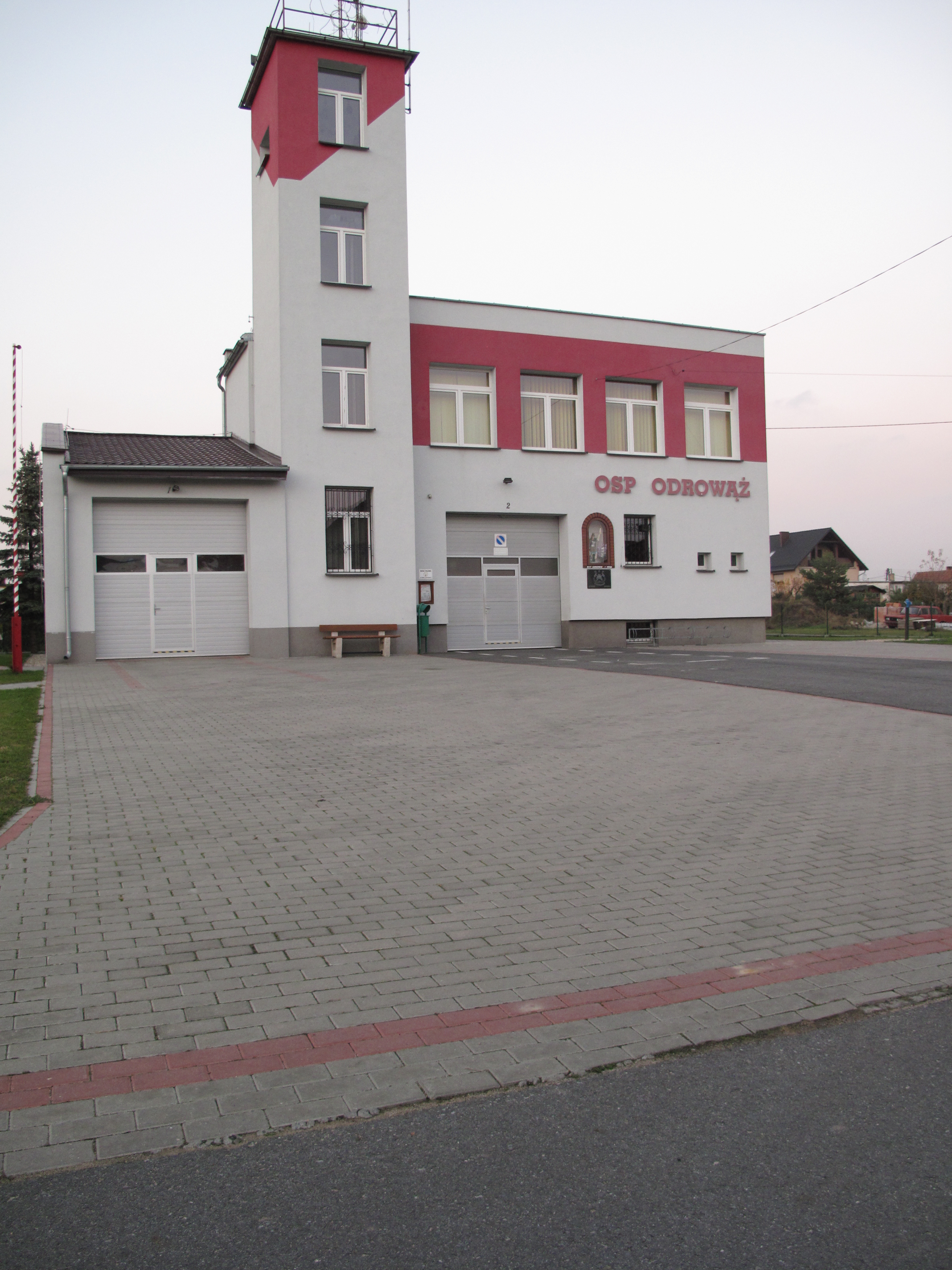
Fire department station
