= Radzikowice =

- Village
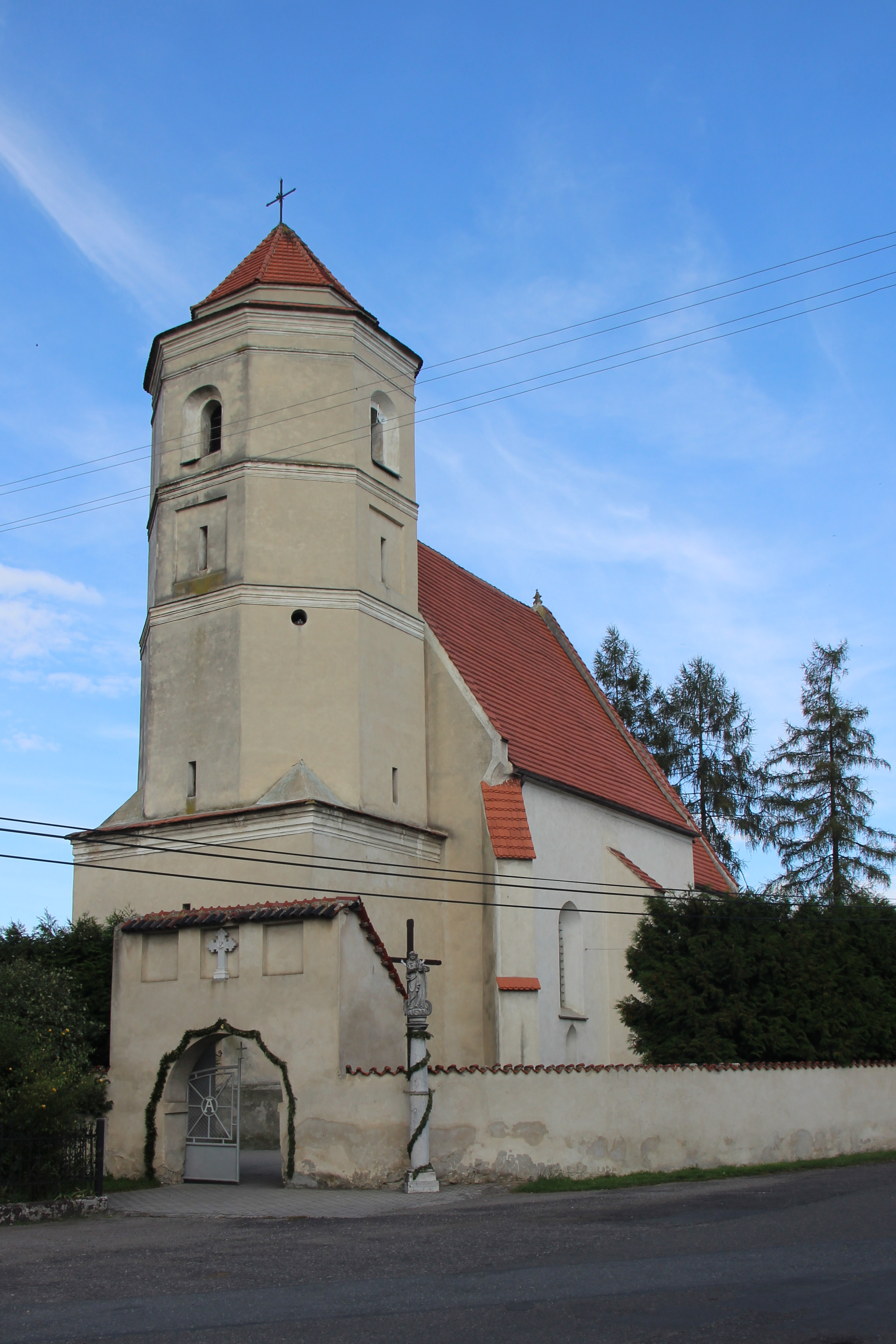
- Saint Bartholomew church in Radzikowice

- Location within Poland
- Coordinates: 50°31′N 17°17′E
- Country: Poland
- Voivodeship: Opole
- County: Nysa
- Gmina: Nysa
- First mentioned: 1291
- Population: 391
- Time zone: UTC+1 (CET)
  - Summer (DST): UTC+2 (CEST)
- Vehicle registration: ONY

Radzikowice [rad͡ʑikɔˈvit͡sɛ] (German: Stephansdorf) is a village in the administrative district of Gmina Nysa, within Nysa County, Opole Voivodeship, in south-western Poland.

== History ==
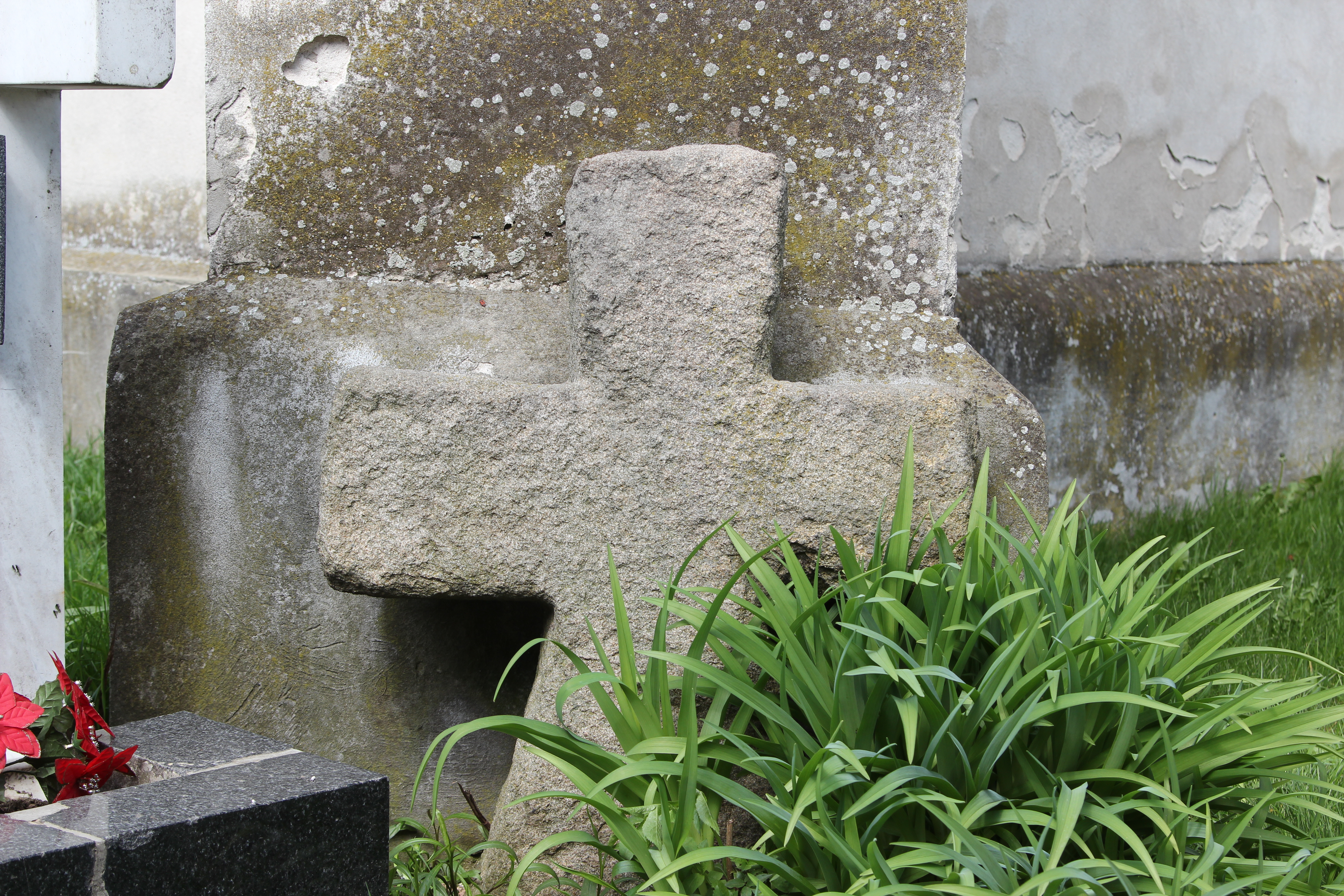
Medieval conciliation cross in Radzikowice

The oldest known mention of the village comes from 1291, although archaeological research has shown that the settlement dates back to the Neolithic period and the Early Middle Ages. In the late 13th-century Liber fundationis episcopatus Vratislaviensis manuscript it was mentioned under the Latinized name Raczikovicz. Its name is of Polish origin and it was part of fragmented Piast-ruled Poland, and afterwards it was also part of Bohemia (Czechia), Prussia and Germany. During World War II, the Germans operated three forced labour subcamps (E291, E532, E628) of the Stalag VIII-B/344 prisoner-of-war camp in the village. The village was restored to Poland after the defeat of Nazi Germany in World War II in 1945.

== Sights ==
The historic structures of Radzikowice include the Gothic-Renaissance Saint Bartholomew church which dates back to the 14th century, two conciliation crosses from the 13th-14th century, and multiple chapels located throughout the village.
