= Gmina Gogolin =

Gmina Gogolin Gogolin Commune
- Gmina
- Flag Coat of arms
- Interactive map of Gmina Gogolin
- Coordinates (Gogolin): 50°29′17″N 18°1′26″E
- Country: Poland
- Voivodeship: Opole
- County: Krapkowice
- Seat: Gogolin

Area
  - Total: 100.51 km^{2} (38.81 sq mi)

Population (2019-06-30)
  - Total: 12,632
  - Density: 125.68/km^{2} (325.51/sq mi)
  - Urban: 6,682
  - Rural: 5,950
- Website: http://www.gogolin.pl/

Gmina Gogolin is an urban-rural gmina (administrative district) in Krapkowice County, Opole Voivodeship, in south-western Poland. Its seat is the town of Gogolin, which lies approximately 5 kilometres (3 mi) north-east of Krapkowice and 21 km (13 mi) south of the regional capital Opole.

The gmina covers an area of 100.51 square kilometres (38.8 sq mi), and as of 2006, its total population was 12,632.

The gmina contains part of the protected area called Góra Świętej Anny Landscape Park.

== Villages ==
Apart from the town of Gogolin, Gmina Gogolin contains the villages and settlements of Chorula, Dąbrówka, Górażdże, Kamień Śląski, Kamionek, Malnia, Obrowiec, Odrowąż and Zakrzów.

== Neighbouring gminas ==
Gmina Gogolin is bordered by the gminas of Izbicko, Krapkowice, Strzelce Opolskie, Strzeleczki, Tarnów Opolski and Zdzieszowice.

== Twin towns – sister cities ==
Gmina Gogolin is twinned with:

- Jablunkov, Czech Republic
- Kysucké Nové Mesto, Slovakia
- Łodygowice, Poland
- Schongau, Germany
- Zwierzyniec, Poland
