= Chorula =

Chorula Chorulla
- Village
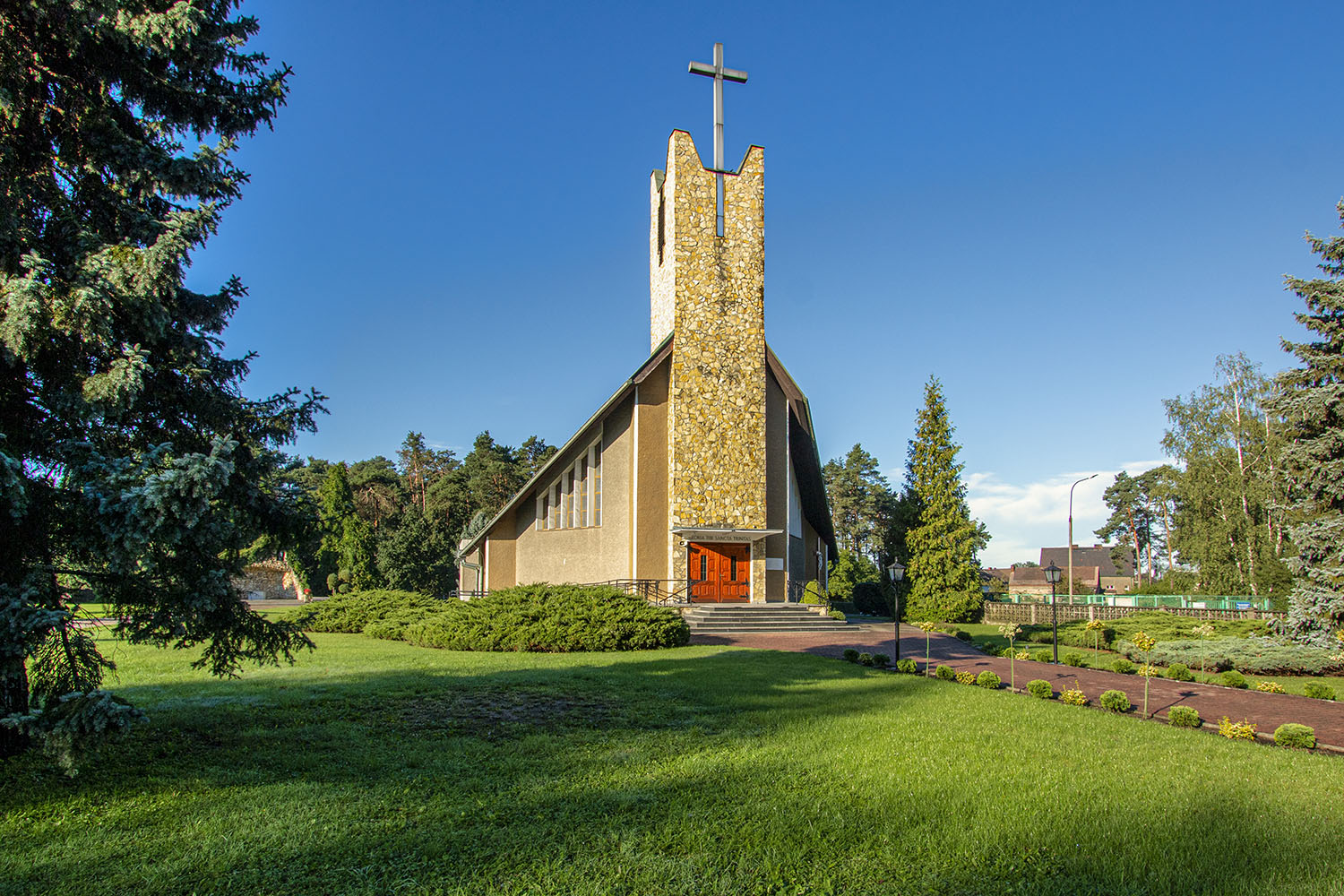
- Holy Trinity church in Chorula

- Location within Poland
- Coordinates: 50°32′N 17°58′E
- Country: Poland
- Voivodeship: Opole
- County: Krapkowice
- Gmina: Gogolin

Population
  - Total: 640
- Postal code: 47-316
- Website: http://www.chorula.pl/

Chorula ([xɔˈrula], additional name in German: Chorulla) is a village in the administrative district of Gmina Gogolin, within Krapkowice County, Opole Voivodeship, in southern Poland.
