= Stalag VIII-B =

WWII German prisoner-of-war camp in Silesia

Stalag VIII-B / Stalag 344 / Stalag Luft VIII-B
- Lamsdorf, Germany (today Łambinowice, Poland)
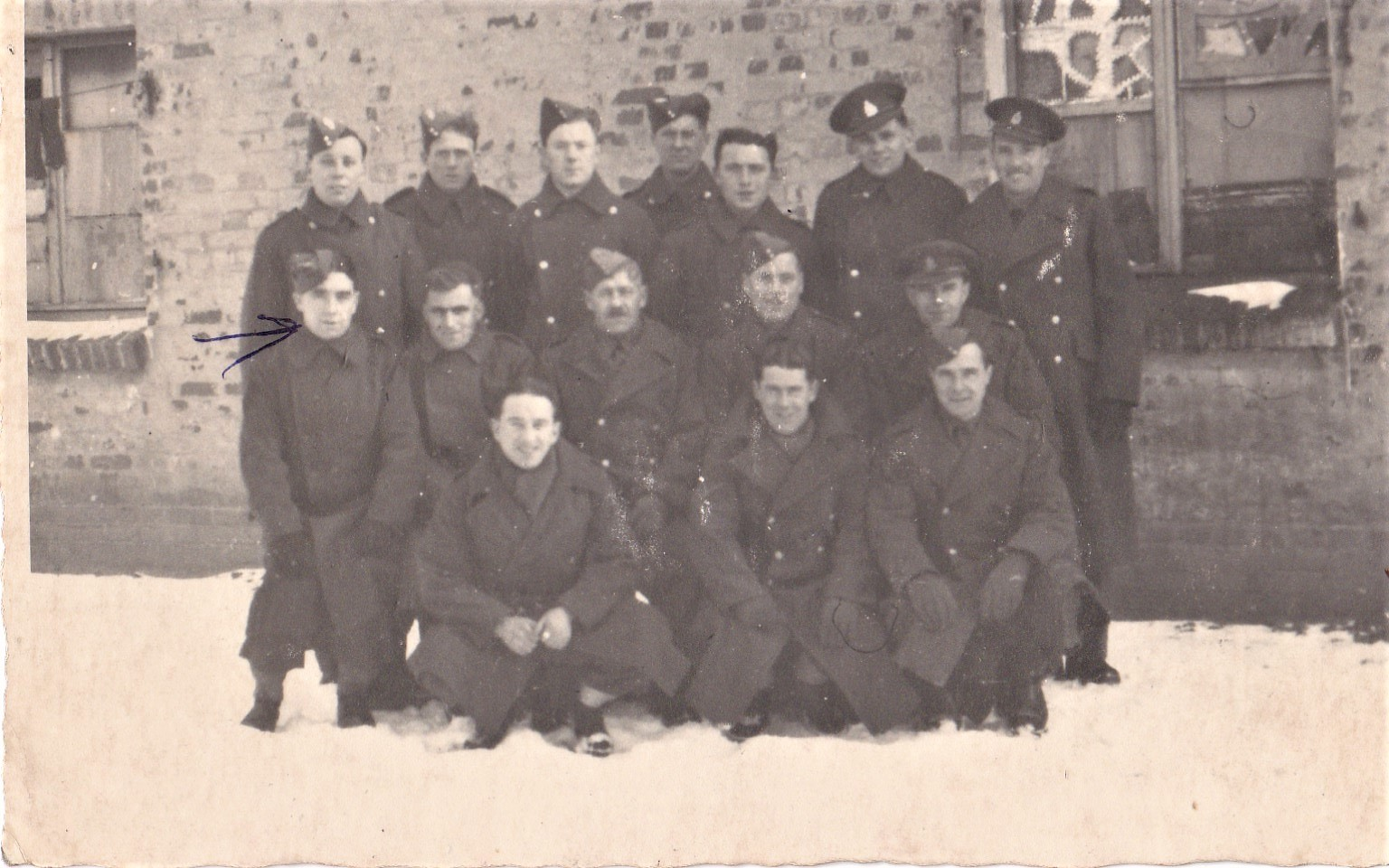
- Prisoners in Stalag VIII-B

Site information
- Type: Prisoner-of-war camp
- Controlled by: Nazi Germany

Location
- (pre-war borders, 1937)
- Location within Poland Location within Germany
- Coordinates: 50.561456°N 17.584125°E

Site history
- In use: 1939–1945
- Battles/wars: World War II

Garrison information
- Occupants: Allied PoW

Stalag VIII-B was most recently a German Army administered POW camp during World War II, later renumbered Stalag-344, located near the village of Lamsdorf (now Łambinowice) in Silesia. The camp contained barracks built to house British and French World War I POWs. The site had housed POWs of the Franco-Prussian War of 1870-71.

== Timeline ==
In the 1860s, the Prussian Army established a training area for artillery at a wooded area near Lamsdorf, a small village connected by rail to Opole and Nysa. During the Franco-Prussian War, a camp for about 3,000 French POWs was established here. During the First World War, a much larger POW camp was established here with some 90,000 soldiers of various nationalities interned here. After the Treaty of Versailles, the camp was decommissioned.

It was recommissioned in 1939 to house Polish prisoners from the German invasion of Poland, which started World War II in September 1939. Later during the war, approximately 100,000 prisoners from Australia, Belgium, British India, British Palestine, Canada, France, Greece, Italy, the Netherlands, New Zealand, Poland, South Africa, the Soviet Union, the United Kingdom, the Isle of Man, the United States and Yugoslavia passed through this camp. In 1941 a separate camp, Stalag VIII-F was set up nearby for Soviet POWs.

In 1943, the Lamsdorf camp population was split up, and many of the prisoners (and Arbeitskommando) were transferred to two new base camps Stalag VIII-C Sagan (modern Żagań) and Stalag VIII-D Teschen (modern Český Těšín). The base camp at Lamsdorf was renumbered Stalag 344.

On 6–7 October, 5,789 Polish insurgents, including women and children of the Warsaw Uprising were brought to the camp. Most were soon moved to other POW camps, including Oflag II-C, Oflag II-D, Oflag VII-A, Stalag XVIII-C, Stalag III-A, Stalag IV-B, Stalag VII-A, Stalag VII-B, Stalag VIII-C, Stalag IX-C, Stalag XIII-D.

The Red Army reached the camp on 17 March 1945.

In 1945-1946, the camp was used by the Soviet-installed Polish Ministry of Public Security to house some 8000-9000 Germans, both POWs and civilians. Polish army personnel being repatriated from POW camps were also processed through Łambinowice and sometimes held there as prisoners for several months. Some were later released, others sent to Gulags in Siberia. About 1000-1500 German prisoners died in the camp due to maltreatment and deprivation: malnutrition, lack of medicine and acts of violence and terror by the Soviet guards. Camp commander Czesław Gęborski would be put on trial for his role in running the camp.

== Stalag Luft VIII-B ==
By 1943 the famous camp for Allied flight personnel in Sagan, Stalag Luft III, was overcrowded. About 1,000 (mostly non-commissioned) flight personnel were transferred to the prison camp at Lamsdorf (now Łambinowice). The flight personnel were housed in what became a camp within a camp when a portion was sectioned off with barbed-wire fencing, and designated Stalag Luft VIII-B. Food continued to be provided from the original camp's army-administered kitchen.

== Medical facilities ==
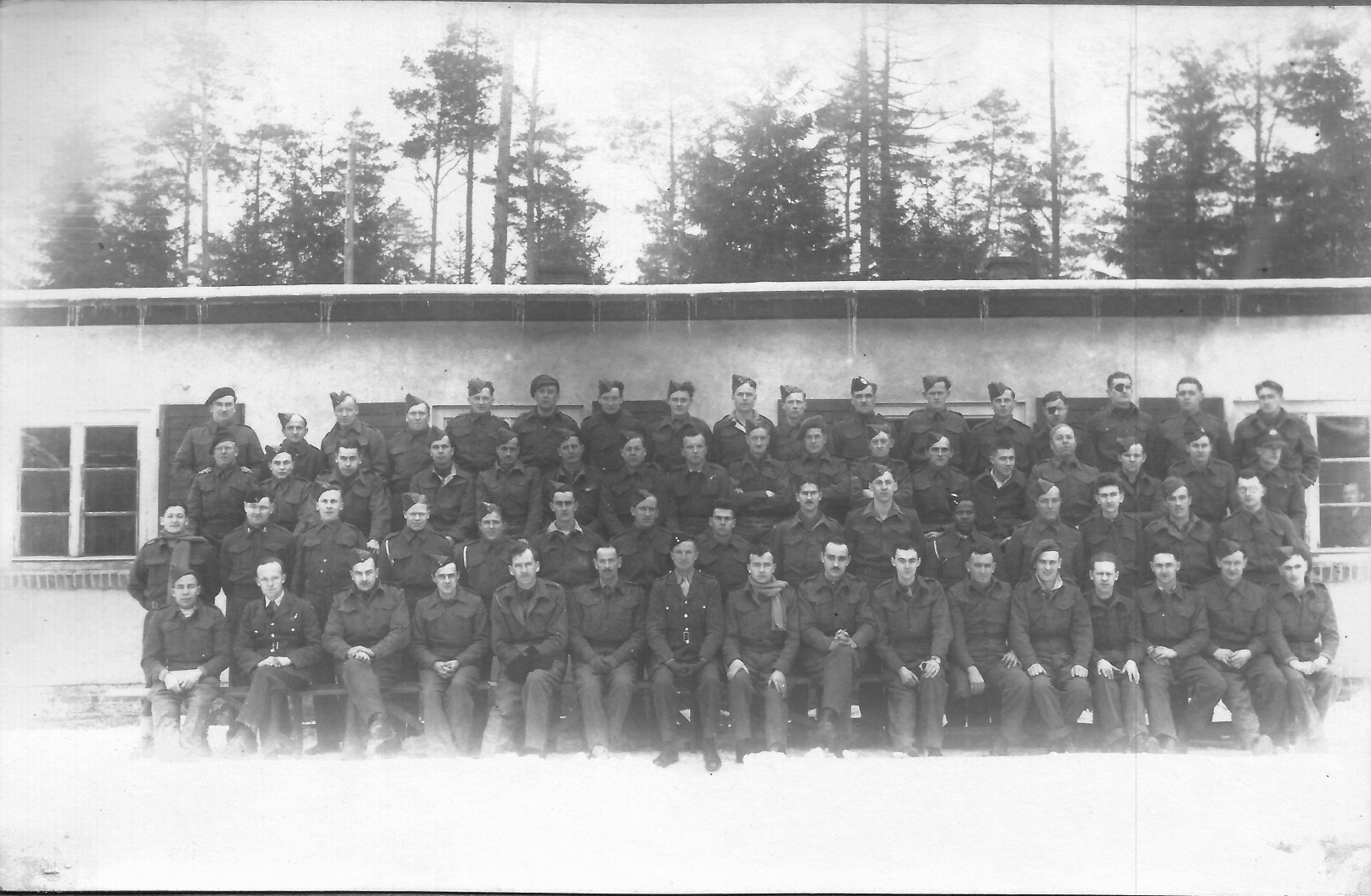
British and Allied surgical patients at prisoner of war camp Stalag 344-E (VIII-B) "Lazarett" Feb 1944

The hospital facilities at Stalag VIII-B were among the best in all the Stalags. The so-called Lazarett was set up on a separate site with eleven concrete buildings. Six of them were self-contained wards, accommodating each about 100 patients. The others served as treatment blocks with operating theaters, X-ray and laboratory facilities, as well as kitchens, a morgue, and accommodations for the medical staff.

The lazarett was headed by a German officer with the title Oberst Arzt ("Colonel Doctor"), but the staff were entirely POWs. They included general physicians and surgeons, even a neurosurgeon, psychiatrist, anesthesiologist and radiologist.

== Forced marches, liberation and repatriation ==
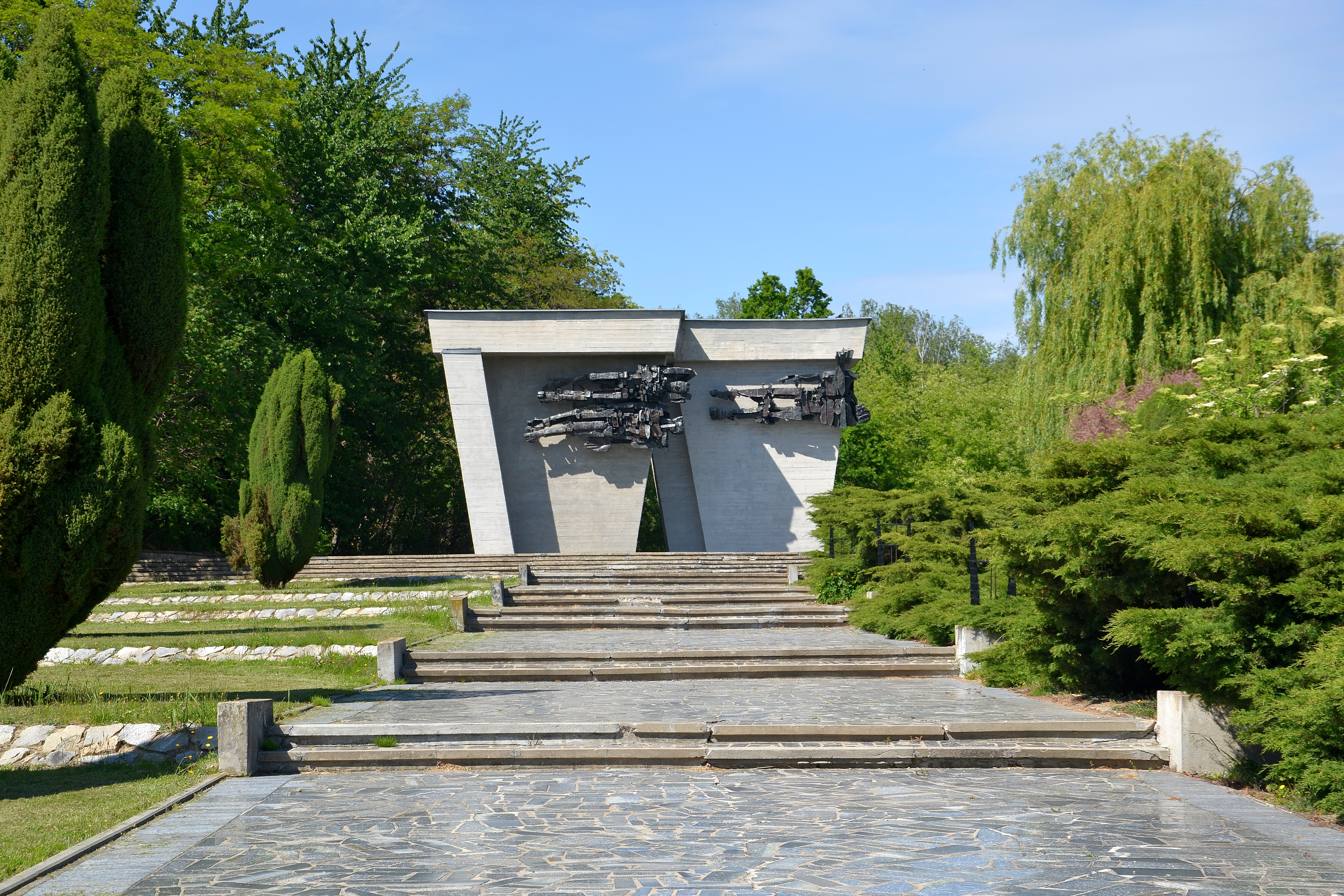
Memorial to the victims

In January 1945, as the Soviet armies advanced into Germany, many of the prisoners were sent on notorious forced marches, westward in groups of 200 to 300. Many deaths resulted from exposure and exhaustion.

Those that encountered western Allies forces were generally repatriated immediately. For those liberated by Soviet forces, repatriation sometimes took several months longer, and often occurred through the port of Odessa, in Ukraine.

== Arbeitskommandos ==
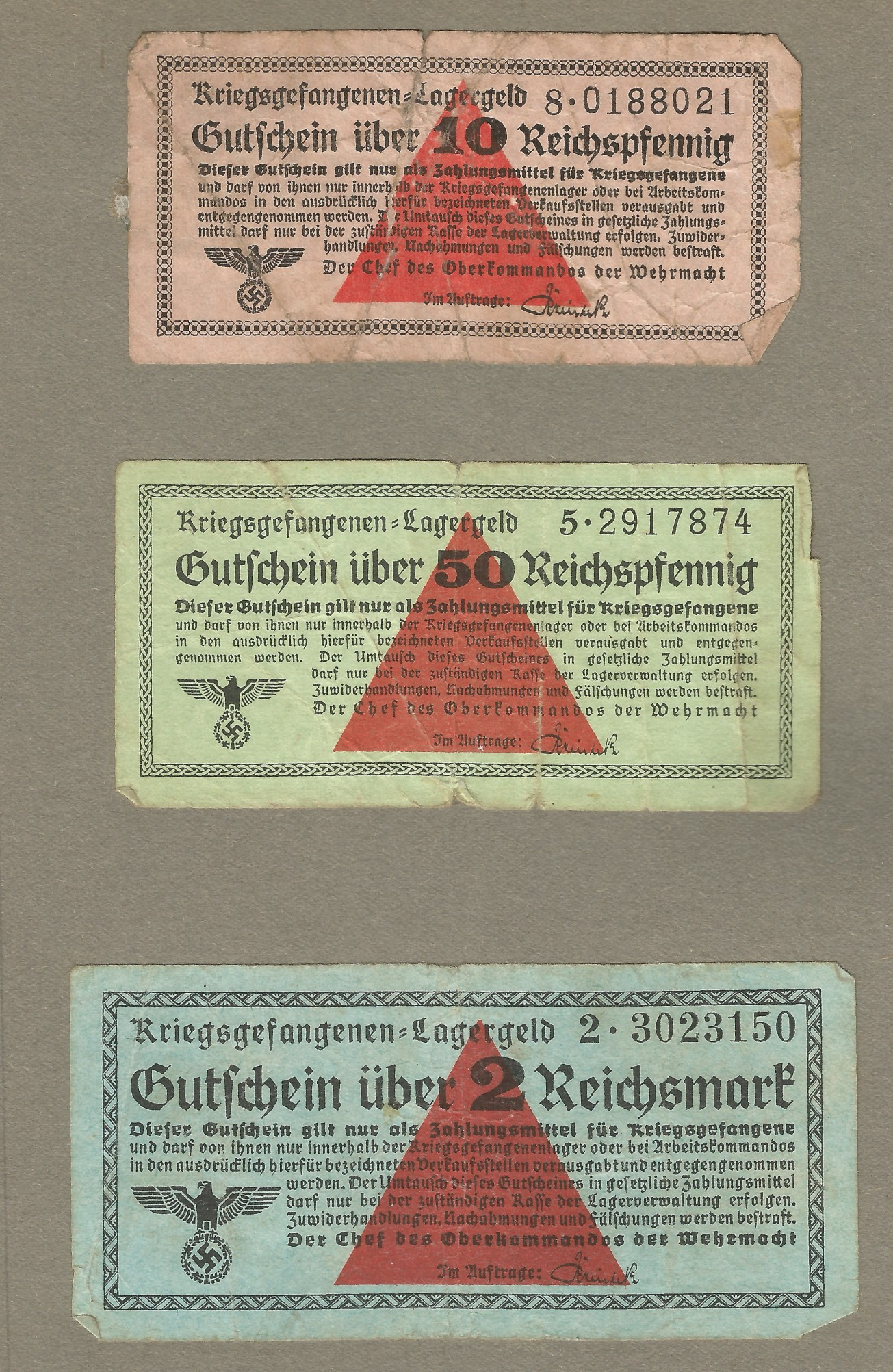
German WWII prison camp money (from Stalag 344/E) 1944

There were more than 700 subsidiary Arbeitskommandos (working parties outside the main camp or labor camps) at various locations in present-day southern Poland and northern Czech Republic. The RC Chaplain Father John Berry said in 1943: "...there are about 600 Working Parties and .... you will be able to guess why so many of you will have not yet had a visit".

Arbeitskommandos were set up to house lower ranks that were working in the coal mines, quarries, factories and on railways. Among them were:

- Siołkowice (Schalkendorf) - work to strengthen the embankments on the Odra River (50/80 POWs)
- Dzierżno (Stauwerder), present-day district of Pyskowice
- E1 in Łabędy (Laband) - (Lager I - Train station) - 1st work at Siemens-Bau-UNION, next at Łabędy (Laband) ironworks (221 POWs) Huta "Łabędy" Gliwice
- E2 in Koźle (Cosel), present day district of Kędzierzyn-Koźle (102 POWs)
- E3 in Blachownia Śląska (Blechhammer), present day district of Kędzierzyn-Koźle at Oberschlesische Hydrierwerke A.G.
- E8 in Krapkowice (Krappitz) at a paper mill run by Natronzellstoff-und Papierfabriken A.G., Werk Krappitz-Zellstof u.Papierfabrik (Fabryka Celulozy i Papieru Natronowego w Krapkowicach) (102 POWs)
- E17 in Opole at a cement factory
- E22 in Gliwice-Sośnica (Gleiwitz-Oehrigen) at Sośnica (Sosnitza) coal mine (290 POWs) (Stalag VIII-B Teschen)
- E25 in Radoszowice (Rauschwalde)
- E27 coal mine
- E30 in Opole-Zakrzów (Oppeln III (Sakrau)) at a cement factory (Oppeln III Portland-Zementwerke/Cementownia "ODRA")
- E31 in Smolarnia (Pechhütte)/Chrzelice (Schelitz)/Łącznik (Lonschnik/Wiesengrund)
- E42 in Rudawa (Rothfest) at a paper mill run by "Rothfest Papierfabrik dr. Albert Spenner GmbH" company (Głuchołaskie Zakłady Papiernicze Zakład Rudawa)
- E51 in Zabrze-Mikulczyce (Hindenburg-Klausberg (Mikultschütz)) at Mikulczyce (Abwehrgrube) coal mine (533 POWs) (Stalag VIII-B Teschen)
- E55 in Zabrze-Biskupice (Hindenburg-Borsig) at Pstrowski (Hedwigs-Wunschgrube) coal mine; Borsig-Koks-Werke
- E62 in Gliwice-Sztygarów (Ligota Zabrska) (Gleiwitz-Steigern (Ellguth-Zabrze)) (23 POWs) (Stalag VIII-B Teschen)
- E71 in Nowa Ruda (Neurode) at the Piast (Rubengrube) coal mine, building gym "Turnhale" and barracks, and in Drogosław (Kunzendorf), present-day district of Nowa Ruda
- E72 in Bytom (Beuthen) at Bytom (Beuthengrube) coal mine (171-204-600 POWs)
- E74 in Domecko (Althaus)
- E75 in Knurów at the Knurów coal mine (262 POWs); 3 POWs were shot while escaping in 1944
- E88 in Wełnowiec (Hohenlohehütte), present-day district of Katowice, at the Król (König) coal mine, "Agnieszka" (Agneschaft) east shaft of the Król mine in Agnieszka (Agneshütte) colony (177 POWs), and in Chorzów (Königshütte) at Prezydent (Königsgrube) coal mine
- E90 in Olszyniec (Erlenbusch) (Nieder Tannhausen)
- E93 in Zakrzów (Sakrau) at a limestone quarry
- E94 in Malnia (Mallnie/Odergrund) - "Emilienhoff" Vorwerk, limestone quarry, "Bata" shoe factory and construction Reichsautobahn motorway; ex-property Malnia "Emilienhof" belonged to Graf von Sponeck
- E110 in Dzierżno (Stauwerder), present-day district of Pyskowice - exploitation of aggregates (39 POWs) (Stalag VIII-B Teschen)
- E114 in Velké Kunětice (Gross Kunzendorf) at a stone quarry and factory
- E115 in Dobra (Burgwasser). Three POWs escaped on 18 August 1941
- E116 in Bělá (Bielau)
- E119 in Mankovice (Mankendorf) at a sawmill
- E126 in Opole-Półwieś (Oppeln-Halbendorf)
- E131 in Gogolin - Tiefbau Pollok - stone quarry
- E138 in Racibórz (Ratibor) - steel works (Schondorff Hegenscheidt Werke Ratibor) (30 POWs), accommodation in a restaurant
- E149 in Rachowice (Buchenlust) - forestry work (68 POWs)
- E150 in Przywory (Oderfest)
- E151 in Zabrze-Maciejów at the Ludwik-Concordia (Concordia-grube) coal mine, Maciej shaft (Westschacht) 1941-42 Gewerkschaft Castellengo-Abwehr A.G.~ Vereinigte Oberschlesische Huttenwerke AG Gleiwitz Werk Donnersmarckhutte
- E152 in Górażdże (Goradze/Waldenstein) at a limestone quarry
- E154 in Golina-Pomianów Dolny (Gollendorf-Nieder Pomsdorf)
- E155 in Koźle-Port (Cosel-Oderhafen) within present-day city limits of Kędzierzyn-Koźle, at the Siemens Papier- und Zellstofwerke Feldmuhle AG (Zakłady Papieru i Celulozy Kędzierzyn-Koźle)
- E159 in Domašov nad Bystřicí (Domstadtl) at a quarry
- E162 in Zdzieszowice (Oderthal/Deschowitz) - Schaffgotsch Benzin Werke GmbH Odertal, POWs held near Odertal-Bahnhof-Hotel building
- E171 in Vápenná - Setzdorf III at Neugebauer limestone quarry (29 POWs)
- E172 in Vápenná - Setzdorf I at a quarry of Alojs Rösner (20 POWs)
- E173 in Vápenná - Setzdorf II at a quarry of Anton Latzel (60 POWs)
- E183 in Bierutów (Bernstadt), probably at a sugar factory (Zuckerfabrik Bernstadt)
- E191 in Steblów (Stöblau)
- E195 in Kopalina (Roding/Kopaline), today part of the village of Ścigów
- E196 Opoleonoora - cement factory
- E198 in Słupiec (Schlegel), present-day district of Nowa Ruda, at the Słupiec (Jan Baptysta/Jan - Nowa Ruda - Johann Baptista-Grube) coal mine
- E199 in Wałbrzych (Waldenburg) at a glass factory in the Biały Kamień district (Weißstein Glashüttenwerk Weihrauch & Zimmer)
- E201 in Dzierżysław (Dirschel) at a gypsum mine
- E203 in Opole, cement works
- E209 in Bobrek, present-day district of Bytom, at the Józef shaft of the Bobrek coal mine (Gräfin Johanna Schacht) (111/141 POWs) (Stalag VIII-B Teschen)
- E211 in Trzebnica (Trebnitz), railway work
- E218 in Pławniowice (Flössingen) - 17 POWs worked the estate of Count von Ballestrem
- E234 in Czerna (Tonhain/Tschirne) at a brickyard
- E243 in Wrocław (Breslau) at municipal gasworks in the Tarnogaj (Dürrgoy) district ("Städtische Gasanstalt Dürrgoy")
- E247 in Głubczyce (Leobschütz)
- E253 in Polska Cerekiew (Neukirch)
- E255 in Twardawa (Hartenau) at a sawmill
- E256 in Zlaté Hory (Zuckmantel)
- E265 in Kolonowskie (Grafenweiler) at "Kartonagenfabrik Colonnowska GmbH"
- E267 in Baborów (Bauerwitz) at a sugar beet factory (64 POWs)
- E268 in Muszczyna (Moschendorf) near Złotoryja (Stalag VIII-A Görlitz)
- E276 in Otmuchów (Ottmachau) at a sugar beet factory
- E283 in Racibórz (Ratibor) at a sugar mill
- E287 in Polska Cerekiew (Neukirch)
- E288 in Baborów (Bauerwitz)
- E291 in Radzikowice (Stephansdorf)
- E294 in Radzikowice (Stephansdorf) at a sugar beet factory
- E297 in Starenhiem Markat Gardening.
- E303 in Pietrzykowice (Petersweiler) at a sugar beet factory
- E324 in Dębieńsko (Gross Dubrnsko), present-day district of Czerwionka-Leszczyny - 25 POWs worked in private estates (Stalag VIII-B Teschen)
- E330 in Tuły (Thule)
- E332 in Rudziniec (Rudgershagen) - 37 POWs worked in private estates; (Stalag VIII-B Teschen)
- E341 in Żyrowa (Zyrowa/Buchenhöh) - 25 POWs
- E354 in Krnov (Jägerndorf) at a saw mill and timber goods factory
- E363 in Kuźnia Raciborska (Ratiborhammer) -1940-43Eng POW(80), "Schondorff-Hegenscheidt Werke" ("RAFAMET") factory making aircraft parts
- E364 in Niemysłowice (Buchelsdorf) at a saw mill
- E365 in Strzelce Opolskie (Gross Strehlitz) at a lime quarry (150 POWs)
- E371 in Głuchołazy (Ziegenhals) at a furniture factory (Pantke und Scheitza)
- E373 in Vlaské (Blaschke), Czech Republic at a sawmill
- E389 in Rudziniec (Rudgershagen) at a sawmill "Sägewerk" (15 POWs) (Stalag VIII-B Teschen)
- E393 in Łaziska Średnie (Mittel-Lazisk), present-day district of Łaziska Górne, at a power station (158 POWs); (Stalag VIII-B Teschen)
- E399 Sudetenland Cardboard Factory
- E406 in Zátor (Seifersdorf) at a brickyard
- E411 in Szombierki (Schönberg), present-day district of Bytom, at the Szombierki Coal Mine (Hohenzollerngrube) (38 POWs), (Stalag VIII-B Teschen)
- E414 in Brzezie (Hohenbirken), present-day district of Racibórz, at a saw mill in Lukasyna/Dębicz (Lukasine)
- E415 in Brzezie (Hohenbirken), present-day district of Racibórz, at a tile factory in Lukasyna/Dębicz (Lukasine)
- E419 in Opole-Groszowice (Oppeln Groschowitz) at a cement factory of the Schlesiche Portland Zement-Industrie A.G. Oppeln company, which in 1941 was taken over by the Verenigte Ost und Mitteldeutsche Zement Aktiengesellschaft company
- E428 in Suchy Bór (Derschau) at a sawmill (2nd owner was Berthold Winkler; 34 POWs)
- E431 in Dolní Teplice (Unter-Weckelsdorf), present-day district of Teplice nad Metují
- E446 in Zlaté Hory (Zuckmantel) - 11 POWs worked at "Śliweczka" sawmill. Accommodation in the sawmill area.
- E456 in Kałków (Kalkau) - fortifications works (60 POWs)
- E460 building railway bridge
- E478 in Toszek (Tost) at a sawmill (20 POWs); Oflag VIII-D Tost; Oflag 6& Ilag A/H POW(1249-military&civilians), buildings hospital -Provinzial–Heil- und Pflegeanstalt (Anstalt)
- E479 in Tarnowskie Góry (Tarnowitz) - 207 POWs railway work
- E484 in Nysa (Neisse) - labouring
- E486 in Nysa (Neisse) - labouring
- E490 in Bytom (Beuthen) - 32 POWs at the railway building (Stalag VIII-B Teschen)
- E494 in Gliwice - 52 POWs railway transport at Gliwice Wschodnie (Sośnica) (Gleiwitz Ost) station, (Stalag VIII-B Teschen)
- E508 in Siemianowice Śląskie (Siemianowitz-Laurahütte) - production of anti-aircraft artillery in the Laura mill (huta "Jedność"; Hütte "Laura" Berghütte Königs- und Bismarckhütte AG Rheinmetall-Borsig)
- E532 in Radzikowice (Stephansdorf)
- E535 in Sosnowiec (Sosnowitz) West - - 500 POWs at the Milowice (Milwitzgrube) coal mine, 6 barracks
- E538 in Sosnowiec-Sielec (Sosnowitz-Sielz) - 526 POWs at the Hrabia Renard coal mine (Grad Renad Grube), barracks on Rzeźnicza street) (Stalag VIII-B Teschen)
- E542 in Łącza (Föhrengrund)
- E543 in Dąbrowa Górnicza (Dombrowa) - 423 POWs at the Paryż (Paris) coal mine, 8 barracks at the wood yard of the Koszelew coal mine (Stalag VIII-B Teschen)
- E548 in Piasek (Sandau)
- E550 in Brzezie (Hohenbirken), present-day district of Racibórz, at a tannery in Lukasyna/Dębicz (Lukasine)
- E552 in Zabrze (Hindenburg) 40 POWs at the firm of Karl Anton at Philipstr
- E560 in Turawa at a sawmill of Graf von Garnier
- E561 in Jaworzno/Tarnowskie Góry (Tarnowitz) at a railway depot loading and unloading trains
- E562 in Libiąż 250 POWS at the Janina Coal Mine (Johanna/Gute Hoffnung)
- E563 in Bory Jeleń-Jaworzno at the Bory (Robertgrube) coal mine (157 POWs); and Jaworzno-Bory at the Sobieski Coal Mine
- E565 in Siersza Wodna, present-day district of Trzebinia, 120 POWS at the Artur (Arthurgrube) coal mine
- E571 in Grudzice (Gruden), present-day district of Opole, at the forestry department
- E578 in Pyskowice (Peiskretscham)
- E579 in Niwka, present-day district of Sosnowiec - 600/1,000 POWs at stalag called "Pawiak", 8 barracks, Modrzejów (Modrowgrube) coal mine ("Theodor Körner" Preussag)
- E580 in Czeladź at the Saturn coal mine, 8 barracks at Węglowa Street, 352 POWs (British paratroopers); (Stalag VIII-B Teschen)
- E585 in Jagerndorf at a brickyard
- E586 in Kazimierz, present-day district of Sosnowiec, at the Kazimierz/Juliusz (Juliusgrube) coal mine, POWs held in a school building at Ligonia 3a street in Pekin-Porąbka
- E587 in Czeladź-Piaski at the Czeladź coal mine (Stalag VIII-B Teschen)
- E593 in Szombierki (Schönberg), present-day district of Bytom - (416 POW at the Szombierki Coal Mine (Hohenzollerngrube) (Stalag VIII-B Teschen)
- E594 in Chorzów (Königshütte Ost) - 197 POWs at a nitrogen plant - Górnośląskie Zakłady Azotowe (Oberschlesische Stickstoffwerke) (Stalag VIII-B Teschen)
- E596 in Jaworzno - Dachs - Piłsudski (Friedrich-August grube) 245/400 POWs at coal mine
- E600 in Głogówek (Oberglogau) at a sugar factory - Cukrownia Głogówek (Hotzenplotzer Zuckerfabrik)
- E603 in Zabrze (Hindenburg) at a rolling mill "Walzmühle-Tänzer" (31 POWs); (Stalag VIII-B Teschen)
- E604 in Bukowo (Georgenwerk) - 10 POWs at forestry work
- E608 in Kaniów (Hirschfelde) - 50 POWs at forestry and agricultural works. In 1942, 2 POWs were shot for refusing to work.
- E701 in Czułów (Czulow), present-day district of Tychy - at a paper factory (Zellulose und Papierfabrik)
- E702 in Klimontów, present-day district of Sosnowiec, at the Klimontów (Bismarck) coal mine,
- E703 in Popielów (Poppelau) at a sawmill
- E704 in Sukowice/Zakrzów (Rosengrund)
- E706 in Zabrze-Biskupice (Hindenburg-Biskupitz) at firm "Borsig-Kokswerke AG" and "Szczęście Ludwika" (Ludwigsglück) coal mine (36 POWs)
- E707 in Sosnowiec (Sosnowitz) - 119 British POWs worked in area of the city (Stalag VIII-B Teschen)
- E708 in Łabędy (Laband), present-day district of Gliwice - construction of railway track (101 POWs); "Baugesellschaft Kahlenbach" (64 POWs), "Vereinigte Deutsche Nickelwerke AG" (37 POWs)
- E711 in Bierawa (Reigersfeld) at a chemical plant of IG Farben company (246 POWs)
- E711A in Kędzierzyn-Koźle at a chemical plant at Heydebreck
- E714 in Blachownia Śląska (Blechhammer), present day district of Kędzierzyn-Koźle - BAB21, BAB48 (Bau Arbeit Bataillon) from 1942 to November 1944 (550/600 POWs), both battalions merged into one battalion in March 1943 (1,100 POWs)
- E715 in Monowice at the IG Farben chemical factory. Set up in September 1943, housed about 1,200 POWs, mostly British.
- E719 in Gliwice-Sztygarów (Ligota Zabrska) (Gleiwitz-Steigern (Ellguth Zabrze)) at Reichswerke Hermann Göring (290 POWs) (Stalag VIII-B Teschen)
- E721 in Kałków-Łąka (Kalkau-Wiesau) at a sugar factory Zuckerfabrik Ottmachau
- E724 in Świętochłowice (Schwientochlowitz) - 198 POWs at smelter "Florian" (Falvahütte)
- E725 in Chorzów at the Batory smelter (Bismarckhütte) - 268 POWs (Stalag VIII-B Teschen)
- E727 in Miechowice (Mechtal), present-day district of Bytom - 346 POWs at a power station (Stalag VIII-B Teschen)
- E728 in Nový Bohumín (Neu Oderberg), present-day part of Bohumín
- E732 in Szczakowa (Schakowa), present-day district of Jaworzno - 152 POWs working on railway embankments
- E734 in Szopienice (Schoppintiz), present-day district of Katowice
- E737 in Fosowskie (Vosswalde), present-day district of Kolonowskie - Chemische Fabrik Vosswalde produced charcoal, which was bagged and sent out by rail, and its by-product of wood alcohol.
- E738 in Trzebinia at a refinery managed by Erdöl Raffinerie Gmbh - 200-300 POWs, (Stalag VIII-B Teschen). The refinery was bombed and destroyed by the Allied air force on 7 August 1944
- E739 in Zielona (Grunkolonie), present-day district of Dąbrowa Górnicza, at Bankowa (Bankhütte) Steel and Ironworks at Zielona Street (152 POWs) (Stalag VIII-B Teschen)
- E740 in Kobiór (Kobier) - 84 POWs at an ammunition depot (Stalag VIII-B Teschen)
- E742 in Łaziska Górne (Ober Lazisk) - 124/150 POWs at Electrowerke factory, 2 barracks in the Kopania colony in Łaziska Górne
- E744 in Kazimierz Górniczy, present-day district of Sosnowiec, at the Kazimierz-Juliusz (Kasimir-Julius/Kasimirgrube) coal mine (497/800 POWs), barracks near Brunona Jasieńskiego street.
- E746 in Chorzów (Königshütte) - 601 POWs work in construction (Stalag VIII-B Teschen)
- E748 in Bobrek, present-day district of Bytom - 48 POWs at the railway (XII - 1943 - Stalag VIII-B Teschen)
- E749 in Pyskowice (Peiskretscham) 187 POWs at the railway (Stalag VIII-B Teschen)
- E750 in Katowice (Kattowitz) - 66 POWs at Huta Baildon (Baildonhütte)
- E753 in Sierakowice (Graumannsdorf/Schierakowitz) - 21 POWs work in forestry
- E754 in Czeladź - 252 POWs at Mars coal mine (Stalag VIII-B Teschen)
- E755 in Wojkowice Komorne (Wojkowitz Komorne), now Wojkowice, at the Jupiter coal mine, Saturn cement mill (UK RAF, French and Italian POWs). Stalag was located in the area of today's Wojkowice prison.
- E756 in Radzionków (Radzionkau) - (155 POWs at Radzionków coal mine (Radzionkaugrube), barracks located at the mine (Stalag VIII-B Teschen)
- E757 in Kalety (Stahlhammer) - 60 POWs at a paper factory (Zellstoff und Papierfabrik Natronag AG/Fabryka Celulozy i Papieru Natronag S.A.), the building of the factory nursery served as a POW camp; in Chebzie (Morgenroth), present-day district of Ruda Śląska at a zinc smelter, and in Janów, present-day district of Katowice at a coal mine (Jutrzenka/Wieczorek?)
- E758 in Knurów - 169 POWs at Dworcowa street, 2 buildings)
- E759 in Gliwice (Gleiwitz) - 49 POWs worked in public transport (Stalag VIII-B Teschen)
- E760 in Bobrek, present-day district of Bytom - 58 POWs work for the Narrow-Gauge Railway Authority (XII - 1943 Stalag VIII-B Teschen)
- E761 in Bobrek, present-day district of Bytom - 17 POWs transport (XII - 1943 Stalag VIII-B Teschen)
- E762 in Bobrek, present-day district of Bytom - 10 POWs at a concrete factory (Beton u.Monierbetrieb) (XII - 1943 Stalag VIII-B Teschen)
- E770 in Otmęt (Ottmuth), present-day district of Krapkowice, at the Bata shoe factory (OTA – Schlesische Schuhwerke Ottmuth A.G./Śląskie Zakłady Przemysłu Skórzanego „Otmęt”)
- E778 in Skorogoszcz (Schurgast) - POW works in a field hospital "SS LAZARET"
- E782 in Kuźnia Raciborska (Ratiborhammer), est. 11 July 1944
- E794 in Kędzierzyn (Heydebreck), present-day district of Kędzierzyn-Koźle - BAB20, BAB40 (Bau Arbeit Bataillon) from 1942 to November 1944 (550/600 POWs), both battalions merged into one battalion in March 1943 (1,100/1,180 POWs)
- E795 in Burgrabice (Borkendorf) at Landesflussbauamt Neisse/Krajowy Urząd Robót Wodnych "Nysa"
- E798 in Grodziec (Friedrichsgrätz) - forestry work (Stalag VIII-B Teschen/Czeski Cieszyn)
- E799 in Krasiejów (Schönhorst) - forestry work
- E800 in Kłodnica (Klodnitz), present-day district of Kędzierzyn-Koźle - work in forestry
- E902 in Zabrze (Hindenburg) - 460 POWs at the Makoszowy coal mine (Delbrückschachte) (Stalag VIII-B Teschen)
- E902 coal mine
- E22050 gas works transport

=== British POWs at Auschwitz ===
E715 was a POW camp for British prisoners which was administered and guarded by soldiers from Wehrmacht because it was a subcamp of Stalag VIII-B camp. However, as it was attached to the Monowitz concentration camp (codenamed Buna after the synthetic rubber it made) which was one of the 28 sub-camps under the control of Auschwitz III, the SS had effective control. E715 was next to the I.G. Farben chemical plant just a few hundred meters away from the entrance to Monowitz.

The first 200 British POWs arrived at Auschwitz in September 1943 but over the winter of 1943 another 1,400 British POWs (mostly captured in North Africa) were transported to E715. Between February and March 1944, 800 were transferred to camps at Blechhammer and Heydebreck-Cosel in Germany. After that, British POWs numbers remained approximately 600 for the remainder of the war. Most POWs were put to work in machine shops making pipes and repairing chemical plant equipment. POWs regularly bore witness to the atrocities occurring at Monowitz because the SS made no attempt to conceal their brutality; the Allied POWs routinely saw inmates from the Arbeitslagers being hanged, pushed off buildings, fatally beaten and shot. Some POWs made contact with concentration camp inmates and passed on information about the war's progress that had been acquired using secret radios in the POW camp. Sergeant Charles Coward even managed to pass intelligence about the atrocities occurring at Monowitz through letters to the British War Office. This led to representatives from the Red Cross making two visits to E715 in the summer 1944.

With the start of the Soviet Vistula–Oder Offensive in January 1945, Auschwitz was evacuated by the SS. The Wehrmacht closed POW camp E715 on January 21, 1945 forcing the British POWs to undertake a forced march to Stalag VII-A at Moosburg in Germany. Three days earlier, the inmates of Monowitz had been sent on their own death march to Gleiwitz near the Czech border where they boarded trains to Buchenwald in Germany and Mauthausen in Austria. Although the British POWs received better treatment than the concentration camp prisoners, they only received slightly more food. In April 1945, the British POWs at Auschwitz were liberated by the U.S. Army at Stalag VII A in Moosburg.

Sgt. Charles Coward testified about what he saw at Monowitz at the IG Farben Trial during the Nuremberg trials:

I made it a point to get one of the guards to take me to town under the pretense of buying new razor blades and stuff for our boys. For a few cigarettes he pointed out to me the various places where they had the gas chambers and the places where they took them down to be cremated. Everyone to whom I spoke gave the same story - the people in the city of Auschwitz, the SS men, concentration camp inmates, foreign workers - everyone said that thousands of people were being gassed and cremated at Auschwitz, and that the inmates who worked with us and who were unable to continue working because of their physical condition and were suddenly missing, had been sent to the gas chambers. The inmates who were selected to be gassed went through the procedure of preparing for a bath, they stripped their clothes off, and walked into the bathing room. Instead of showers, there was gas. All the camp knew it. All the civilian population knew it. I mixed with the civilian population at Auschwitz. I was at Auschwitz nearly every day ... Nobody could live in Auschwitz and work in the plant, or even come down to the plant without knowing what was common knowledge to everybody.

Even while still at Auschwitz we got radio broadcasts from the outside speaking about the gassings and burnings at Auschwitz. I recall one of these broadcasts was by Anthony Eden himself. Also, there were pamphlets dropped in Auschwitz and the surrounding territory, one of which I personally read, which related what was going on in the camp at Auschwitz. These leaflets were scattered all over the countryside and must have been dropped from planes. They were in Polish and German. Under those circumstances, nobody could be at or near Auschwitz without knowing what was going on.

In 1998, Arthur Dodd, a former British POW from Camp E715, published Spectator In Hell, a book about his time imprisoned at Monowitz.
