= Micritisation =

Micritisation (or Micritization) is the activity of certain organisms in the clasts of carbonate sediments, whereby the organisms retract nutrients from the carbonate. Micritisation is a process that falls under diagenesis of a sediment.

The organisms can be algae, fungi or bacteria. These organisms bore small "tunnels" in the original crystals that the clasts were built from. When the micritisation goes on long enough the process can form micritisation envelopes around the clast, especially with larger clast (such as shell fragments).

Micritisation disrupts the original crystal structure, chemical composition and structure of the clasts in the sediment.
