= Zygfryd Blaut =

Polish footballer (1943–2005)

Personal information
- Full name: Zygfryd Ewald Blaut
- Date of birth: 2 March 1943
- Place of birth: Gogolin, Nazi Germany
- Date of death: 20 April 2005 (aged 62)
- Place of death: Opole, Poland
- Height: 1.73 m (5 ft 8 in)
- Position: Defender

Youth career
- 1957–1959: Budowlani Gogolin

Senior career*
Years	Team	Apps	(Gls)
1959–1963	Odra Opole		
1963–1964	Śląsk Wrocław		
1964–1965	Odra Opole		
1965–1968	Śląsk Wrocław		
1968–1974	Legia Warsaw		
1974	Polonia Warsaw		

International career
1970	Poland	1	(0)

Managerial career
- 1996–1997: Odra Opole
- MKS Gogolin
- 2004–2005: Odra Opole
- * Club domestic league appearances and goals

Zygfryd Ewald Blaut (2 March 1943 – 20 April 2005) was a Polish footballer who played as a Defender. He also played in one international match for Poland against Iraq.

Blaut was born in Gogolin on 2 March 1943. He died on 20 April 2005, His older brother, a fellow footballer Bernard, died on 19 May 2007.

He had his most successful spell with Legia Warsaw between 1969 and 1973, winning two national titles and the Polish Cup. During a tour of Spain and South America in 1971–72, he sustained an injury which severely hampered his progress.

== Honours ==
Legia Warsaw

- Ekstraklasa: 1968–69, 1969–70
- Polish Cup: 1972–73
