= Bernard Blaut =

Polish footballer (1940–2007)

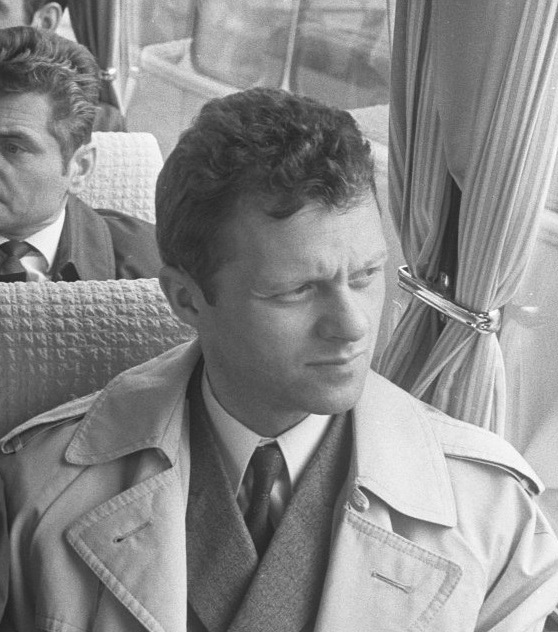

Personal information
- Full name: Bernard Adolf Blaut
- Date of birth: 3 January 1940
- Place of birth: Krappitz, Nazi Germany
- Date of death: 19 May 2007 (aged 67)
- Place of death: Warsaw, Poland
- Height: 1.85 m (6 ft 1 in)
- Position: Midfielder

Senior career*
Years	Team	Apps	(Gls)
1958–1962	Odra Opole	48	(2)
1962–1972	Legia Warsaw	236	(30)
1972–1974	FC Metz	42	(1)

International career
1960–1971	Poland	36	(3)

Managerial career
- 1972: Hutnik Warsaw
- 1981–1982: COT
- 1986–1988: COT
- 1990: United Arab Emirates
- 1993–1994: Club Africain
- 1998: COT
- 2000: COT
- 2001: COT
- 2004: COT
- * Club domestic league appearances and goals

Bernard Adolf Blaut (3 January 1940 – 19 May 2007) was a Polish footballer and manager. He is most famous for his 1960s performances in both Legia Warsaw and the Poland national team.

Between 1960 and 1971 he was capped 36 times for Poland, scoring three goals. In 1972, he moved to France, where he played for FC Metz till 1974.

His younger brother Zygrfryd was also a footballer. He died on 19 May 2007 in Warsaw.

== Honours ==
=== Player ===
Legia Warsaw

- Ekstraklasa: 1968–69, 1969–70
- Polish Cup: 1963–64, 1965–66
