= Turawskie Lake =

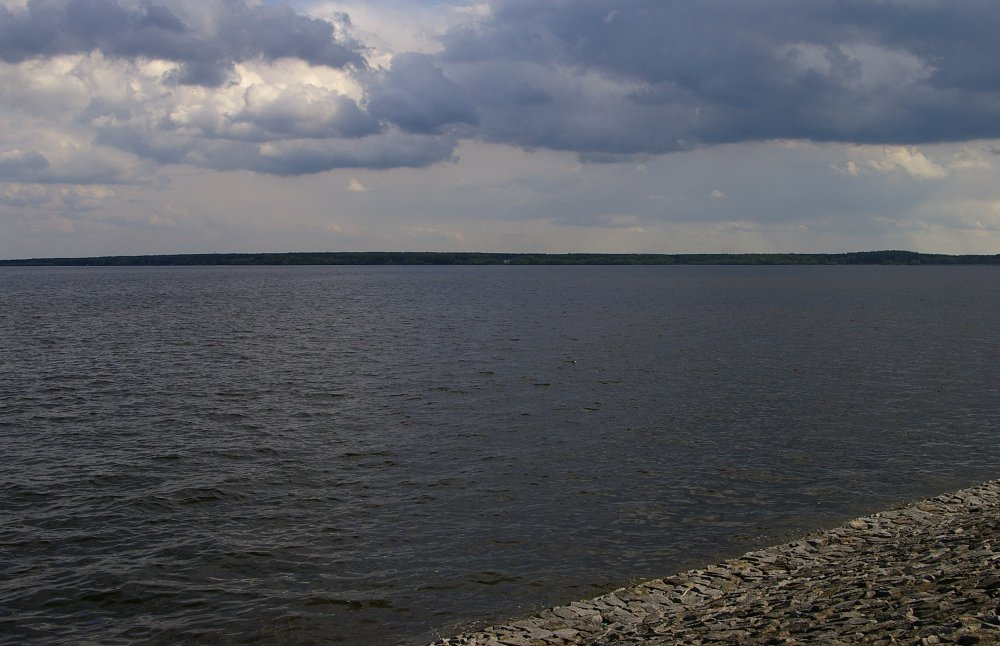
- Turawskie Lake

- Location within Opole Voivodeship
- Coordinates: 50°43′19″N 18°07′48″E
- Type: lake
- Primary outflows: Mała Panew, Libawa
- Basin countries: Poland
- Surface area: 24 km^{2} (9.3 sq mi)
- Average depth: 5 m (16 ft)
- Max. depth: 13 m (43 ft)
- Water volume: 108×10^{6} m^{3} (88,000 acre⋅ft)
- Settlements: Kotórz Wielki, Turawa, Szczedrzyk

Turawskie Lake is a retention reservoir in the flow of the river Mała Panew with an area of 24 km^{2}, with a 13 metres high dam, with a maximum depth of 13 metres and a maximum full capacity of 108 mln m^{3}.

The reservoir was built between the years 1933 to 1939 with the name Turawa Stausee, to regulate the height of the water in the river Oder and for recreational purposes. Due to this the settlements of Zamoście (German Hinterbrueck), Krzyślina (German Krysline), the hamlet of Łuk, Pustków and Szczedrzyk were destroyed and new villages were built around the reservoir to serve for tourist purposes; the hamlet Szczedrzyk had been rebuilt around the South of the reservoir with the road Opolska connecting and circulating around the reservoir. Several families were relocated and given compensation or have been offered houses in the nearby Ligota Turawska.

In addition to the river Mała Panew a smaller river Libawa leaves the reservoir. At the outflow from the reservoir there is a hydroelectric plant with the power of 1.2 MW. Northern and southern parts of the reservoir have beaches which are surrounded by pine forests with many holiday resorts. The reservoir is also popular with water sports.

Near the reservoir are other lakes. Lake Średnie and Małe (both are to the South of reservoir) which are the result of gravel extraction sites used in the construction of the dam at the reservoir. Srebrne Lake (other names include Osowiec, Zielone or Szmaragdowe) is located in the forest near the village of Osowiec Śląski and Turawa and is around 2 km from the reservoir. The lake covers an area of 12 hectares, and the depth is up to 17 metres. The lake was created on the site of a big flooded pit.
