= Bziniczka =

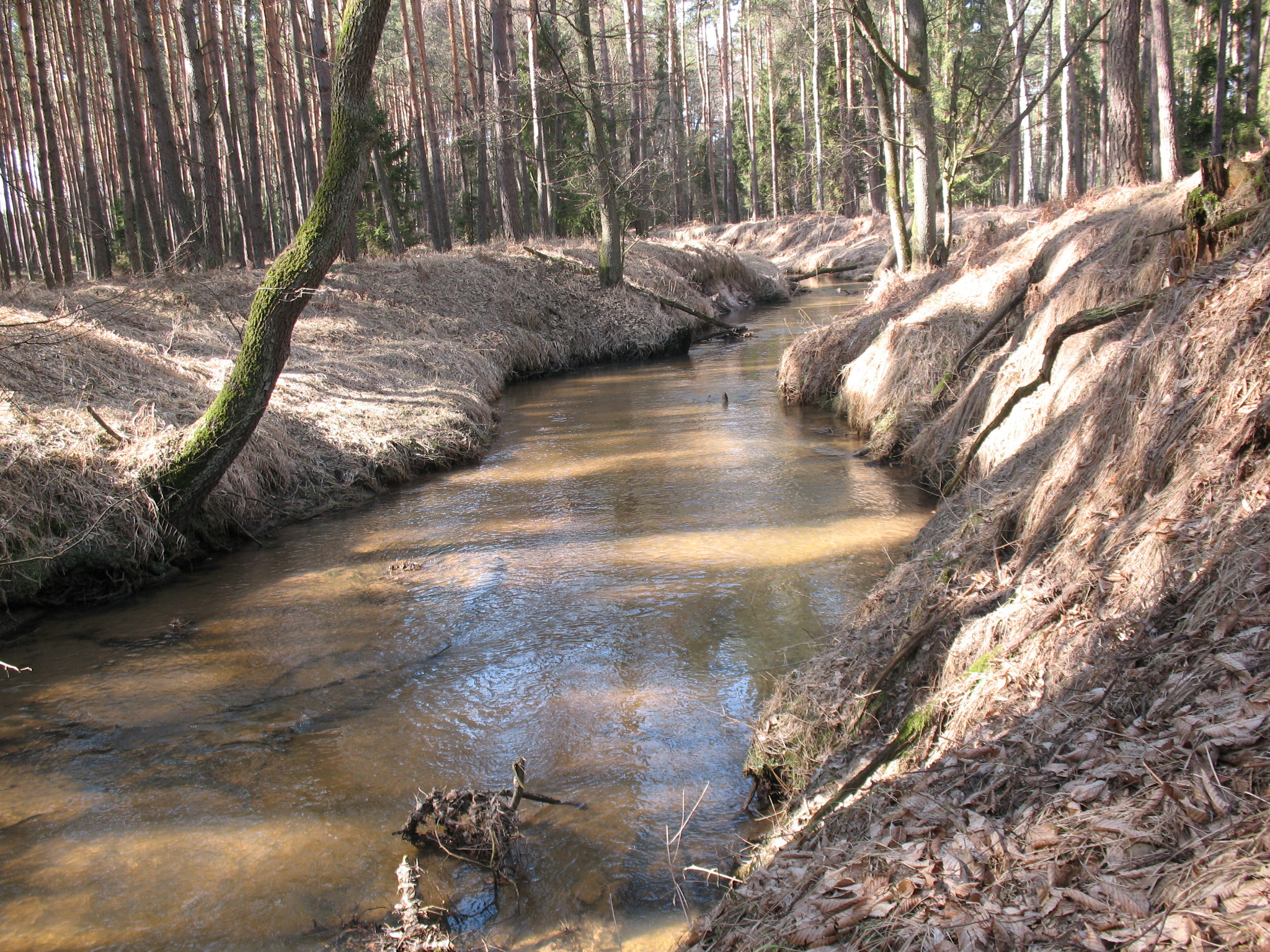
- Bziniczka near Kolonowskie

Location
- Country: Poland
- Voivodeships: Silesian, Opole

Physical characteristics
- Source
  - location: near Gwoździany
  - coordinates: 50°43′06.7″N 18°30′34.3″E
  - elevation: 270 m (890 ft)
- Mouth: Mała Panew
  - location: near Kolonowskie
  - coordinates: 50°39′17″N 18°21′41″E
  - elevation: 190 m (620 ft)
- Length: 15.75 km (9.79 mi)

Basin features
- Progression: Mała Panew→ Oder→ Baltic Sea

The Bziniczka is a river of Poland. It is a right tributary of the Mała Panew near Kolonowskie.
