= Fosowskie =

- District of Kolonowskie
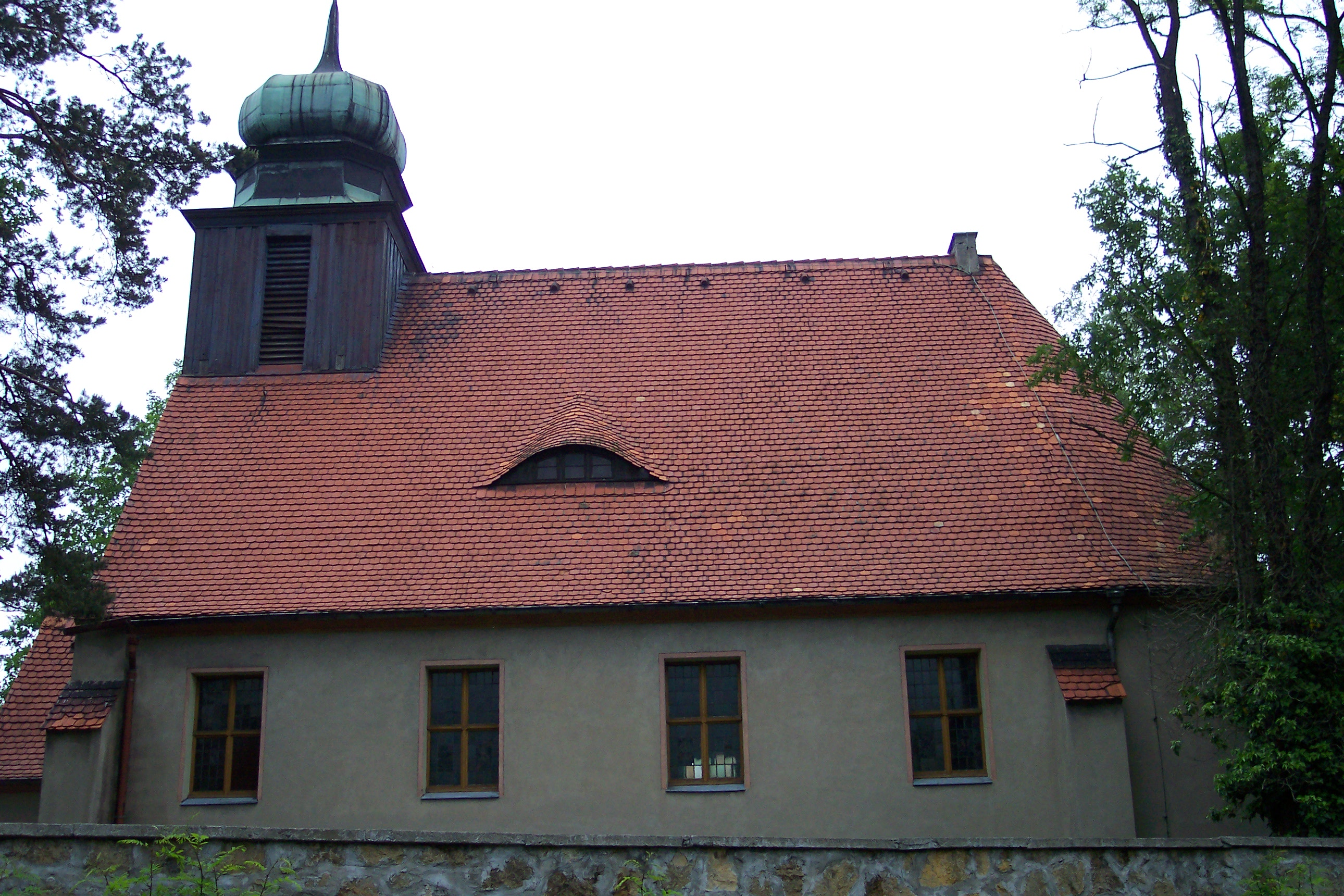
- Evangelical church in Fosowskie
- Interactive map of Fosowskie
- Coordinates: 50.670°N 18.372°E
- Country: Poland
- Voivodeship: Silesian
- County: Strzelce
- Gmina: Kolonowskie
- Town: Kolonowskie
- Established: 18th century
- Within town limits: 1973
- Time zone: UTC+1 (CET)
  - Summer (DST): UTC+2 (CEST)
- Vehicle registration: OST

Fosowskie (German: Vossowska, 1936-45: Vosswalde), also called Wosowska between 1945 and 1948, is a district of the southern Polish town of Kolonowskie, Strzelce County, Opole Voivodeship, located at the Mała Panew river.

== History ==
Fosowskie was for most of its history a separate village. It quickly developed in the 19th century, due to steelworks, constructed there in 1790.

The original name Vossowska comes from engineer Arnold Heinrich Voss (1753–1838), who, upon order of Prussian count Filip Colonna, designed both the steelworks and a settlement for the workers. In the second half of the 19th century, the village became a major railroad junction, with several lines crossing there. In 1858 the Opole–Tarnowskie Góry connection was completed. In 1868 the line Fosowskie–Kluczbork–Wrocław was added, in 1894: Fosowskie–Lubliniec–Herby, in 1912: Fosowskie–Strzelce Opolskie and finally in 1913: Fosowskie–Dobrodzień.

During World War II, the Germans operated the E260 and E737 forced labour subcamps of the Stalag VIII-B/344 prisoner-of-war camp for Allied POWs in the settlement.

Fosowskie became part of the town of Kolonowskie in 1973.
