= Srebrne Lake =

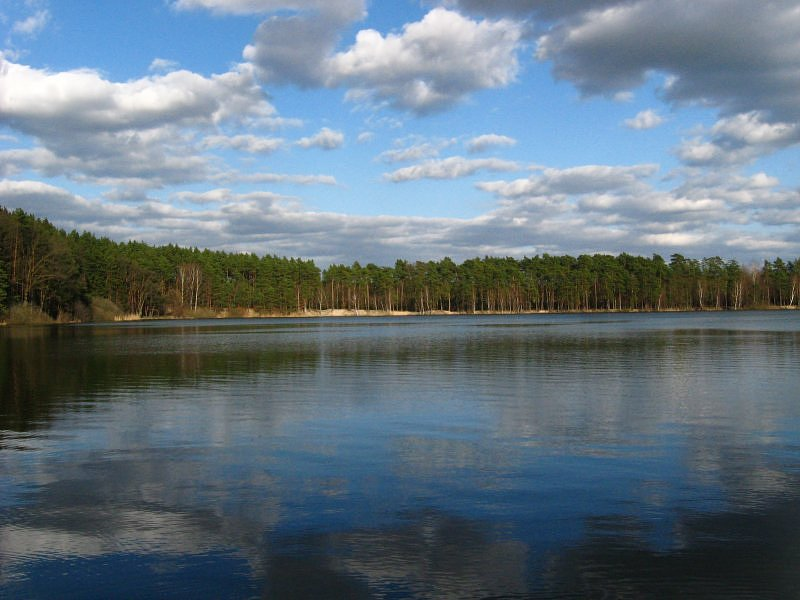
- Srebrne Lake

- Location within Opole Voivodeship
- Coordinates: 50°45′27″N 18°04′32″E
- Type: lake
- Basin countries: Poland
- Surface area: 12 ha (30 acres)
- Average depth: 9 m (30 ft)
- Max. depth: 17 m (56 ft)
- Water volume: 3,519,191 m^{3} (2,853.055 acre⋅ft)

Srebrne Lake (Polish: Jezioro Srebrne, also known as Jezioro Szmaragdowe) is an artificial lake formed by the flooding of a former extraction pit and is used for recreation. It has an area of about 12 ha (30 acres) and a maximum depth of about 17 m (56 ft). The lake lies in a pine forest about 2 km (1.2 mi) from Turawskie Lake, near the settlement of Marszałki.

Although much smaller than Turawskie Lake, Srebrne Lake is popular with tourists due to its sheltered location, facilities and high water quality; its distinctive emerald colour has given rise to the alternative name Szmaragdowe (“Emerald”).
