= Turawa =

- Village
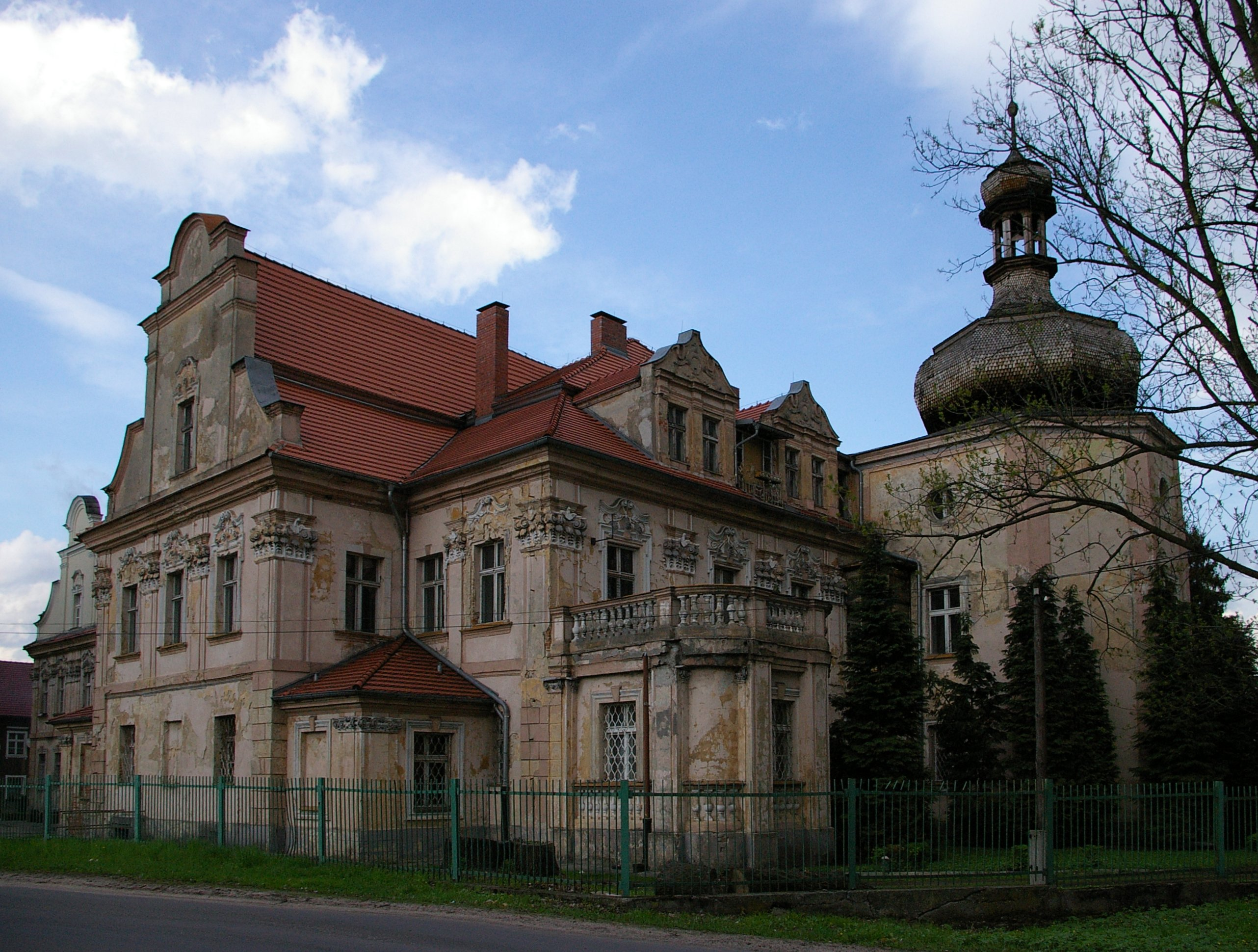
- Turawa Palace

- Location within Poland
- Coordinates: 50°45′N 18°4′E
- Country: Poland
- Voivodeship: Opole
- County: Opole
- Gmina: Turawa
- Population (approx.): 900
- Time zone: UTC+1 (CET)
  - Summer (DST): UTC+2 (CEST)
- Vehicle registration: OPO

Turawa [tuˈrava] is a village in Opole County, Opole Voivodeship, in southern Poland. It is the seat of the gmina (administrative district) of Gmina Turawa.

== History ==
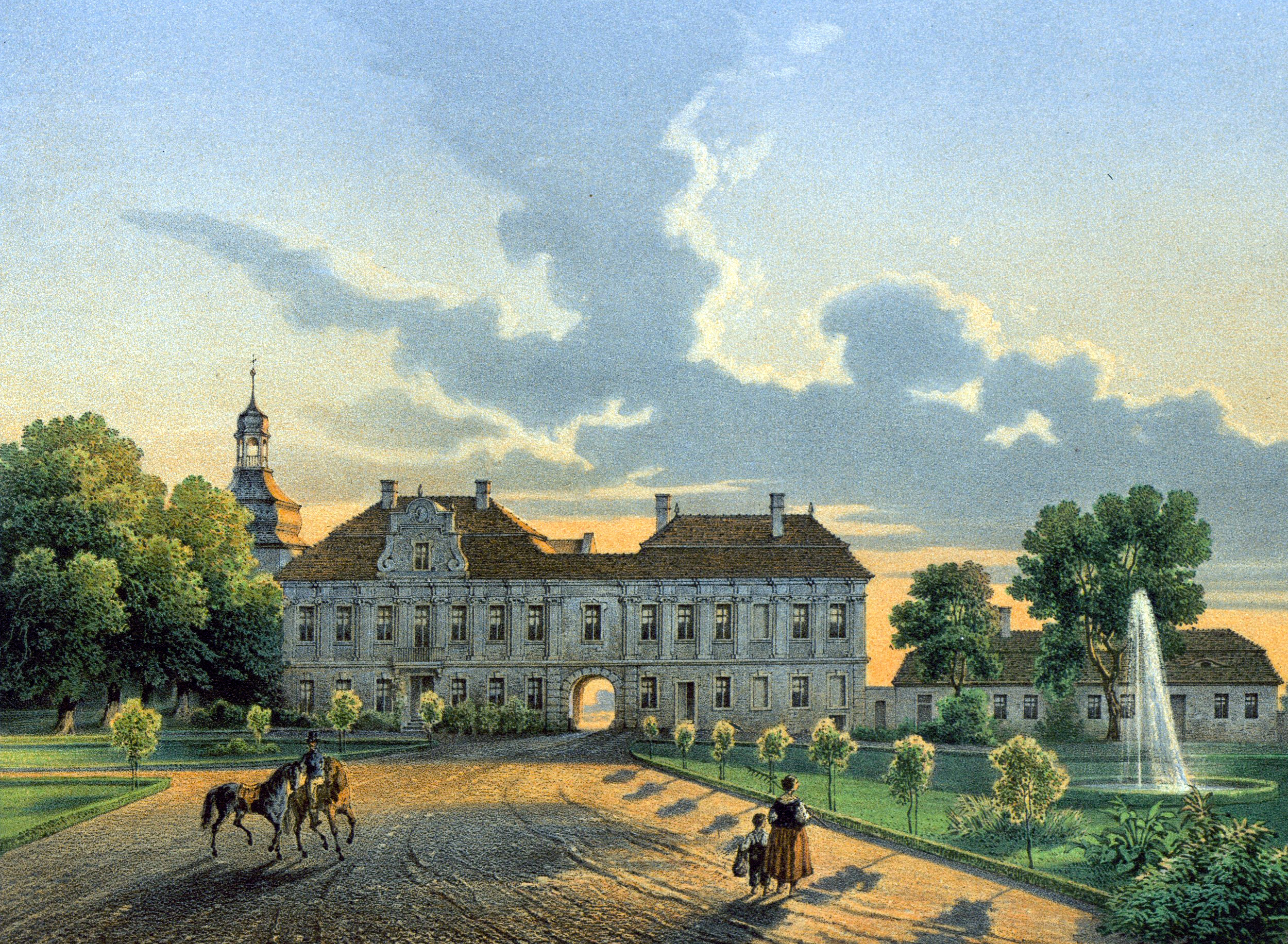
19th-century view of the palace

Though the village's origins are not known, local legend states that the rich forests around the village were used as a hunting ground by the Dukes of Opole of the Polish Piast dynasty. According to linguist Heinrich Adamy, the name comes from the Polish word tur, meaning "aurochs", who built a hunting lodge in the area. The first documents that mention Turawa are from the beginning of the 16th century, and mention two estates, both named Kuchar, belonging to the village of Kotorz Wielki. One of them was Turawa, while the second was on a site now flooded by the Turawa Reservoir. The name was probably given around 1562 by Georg von Königsfeld, the owner of the manor the settlement was located on. The settlement, along with its hamlets of Marszałki and Łyczyna continued to belong to the village of Kotorz Wielki until the eighteenth century. In 1712, the settlement and the surrounding property was sold by Franz Karl von Blankovsky to Martin Scholtz von Löwencron of Kamieniec and Wieszowa, who began construction of the present palace. The village was annexed by Prussia following the Silesian Wars, and from 1871 to 1945 it was also part of Germany. Martin Scholtz's son, Joseph, died childless in 1759 and his widow, Anna Barbara von Garnier, remarried Franz Adam Count von Gaschin. After her death in 1804, Turawa was owned for years by a brother, Franz Xavier von Garnier. From then until the end of World War II the village was owned by the von Garnier family, who in 1841 received the title of count (with the name Count von Garnier-Turawa.) In those times Turawa had 581 inhabitants. The last owner of Turawa was Hubertus Count von Garnier-Turawa, a German nationalist member of the Prussian Landtag (1925-1932), who called for the revision of the interwar Polish-German border either peacefully or by force. He died in 1952 in Unterwössen in Bavaria.

At the end of the nineteenth century, a chapel and cemetery were built on Bald Hill near the village, which came to be considered one of the most beautiful religious buildings in Turawa. However, after 1945 the building was systematically devastated as part of the Communist government's anti-German campaign. In 1965 the chapel was blown up, and in 1976 the ruins were removed.

In the 1930s, a project came up for consideration in Opole (then Oppeln) for the construction of an artificial reservoir to protect the city against flooding. Hubertus von Garnier offered his own lands west of Turawa for the project. In 1933 the project was submitted to the German government, receiving the personal approval of Adolf Hitler. Construction on the 22 km^{2} (8.5 sq mi) reservoir finished in 1938. As a result of the project, several small villages were flooded, and many of their citizens were relocated to Turawa.

During World War II, the Germans operated the E394 and E560 forced labour subcamps of the Stalag VIII-B/344 prisoner-of-war camp in the village. After Germany's defeat in the war, in 1945, the village became again part of Poland, although with a Soviet-installed communist regime, which stayed in power until the Fall of Communism in the 1980s. Since 1945, Turawa became the seat of the municipality (gmina), with its first wójt, Roch Stotko.

== Palace ==
Construction on the current palace in Turawa began in 1730 at the behest of Martin Scholtz von Löwenckron to plans by the Opole-based architect Adam Tentschert. In 1751 his son, Joseph, expanded the palace, adding a chapel with bell tower. It was again expanded in 1761 with the construction of the north wing and entrance gate. In 1847 Karl Count von Garnier completely refurbished the somewhat neglected palace. In 1937, the family von Garnier gave the palace to be used as an orphanage. After the Second World War, in 1949, the palace was given to the Children's Home of Turawa. After a fire in the offices of the district council building, it also housed temporarily the municipal offices. Between 1964 and 1965 the palace was remodeled to better suit the needs of the orphans. To this day, it preserves a mixture of Baroque, neo-Renaissance, and neo-Rococo architecture, including marble fireplaces, Baroque bookshelves, gilded wall deceptions and stucco, and a grand ballroom. The park surrounding the palace is filled with interesting old trees, including white oak, ash, and linden.
