= Magda =

Magda may refer to:

- Magda (given name), a feminine given name (including a list of persons with the name)
- Marinko Magda (born 1963), Serbian mass murderer
- Magda, Opole Voivodeship, a village in Poland
- Magda, São Paulo, Brazil, a municipality
- Heimat (play), commonly known as Magda, an 1893 play by Hermann Sudermann
- Magda (1917 film), an American film by Emile Chautard, based on Heimat
- Magda (2004 film), an animated short film by Chel White
