= Kadłub Turawski =

Kadłub Turawski Kadlub Turawa
- Village
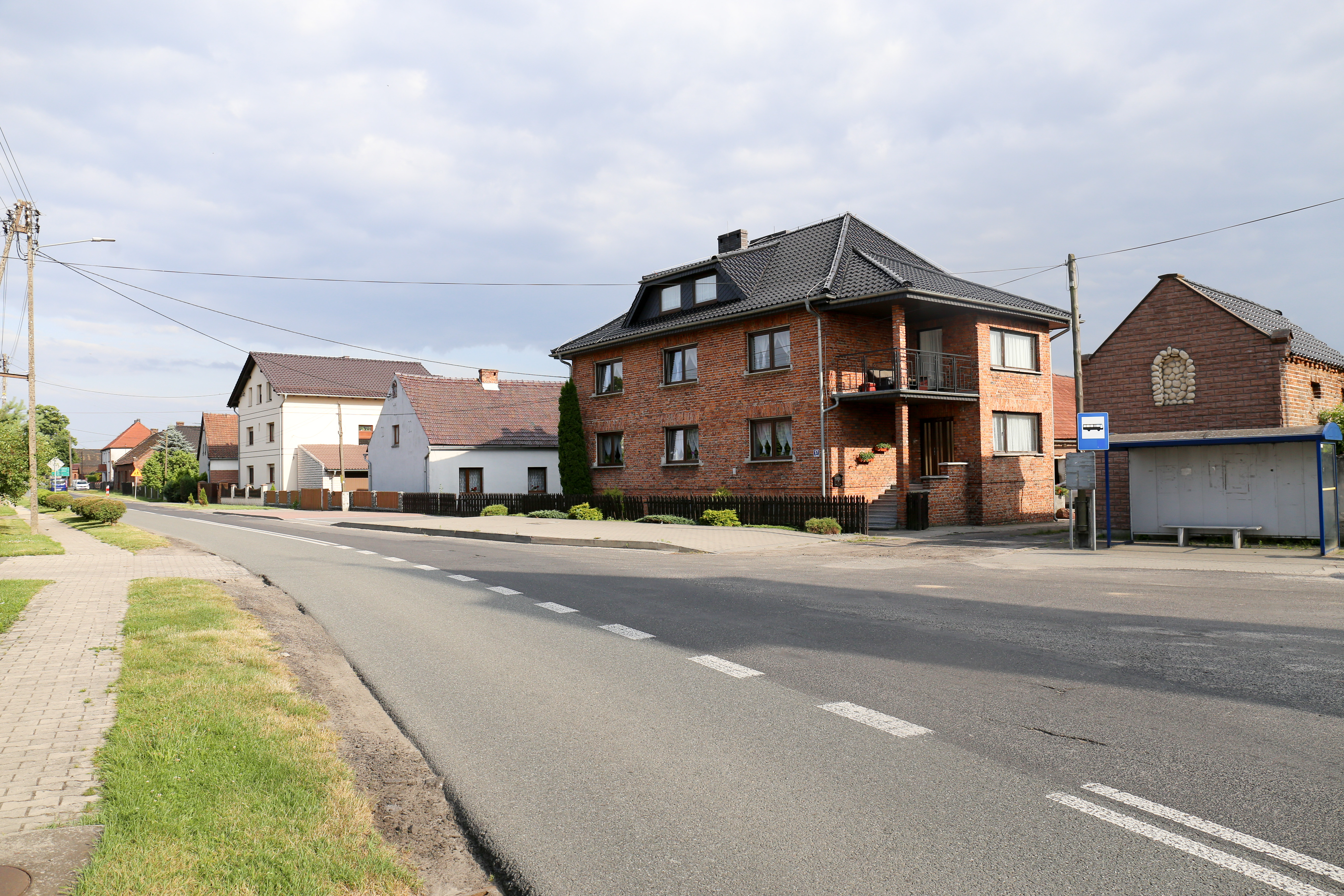

- Location within Poland
- Coordinates: 50°46′N 18°12′E
- Country: Poland
- Voivodeship: Opole
- County: Opole
- Gmina: Turawa
- Time zone: UTC+1 (CET)
  - Summer (DST): UTC+2 (CEST)
- Vehicle registration: OPO

Kadłub Turawski ([ˈkadwup tuˈrafski], additional name in German: Kadlub Turawa) is a village in the administrative district of Gmina Turawa, within Opole County, Opole Voivodeship, in south-western Poland.
