= Adolf Zábranský =

Czech illustrator, painter and graphic artist

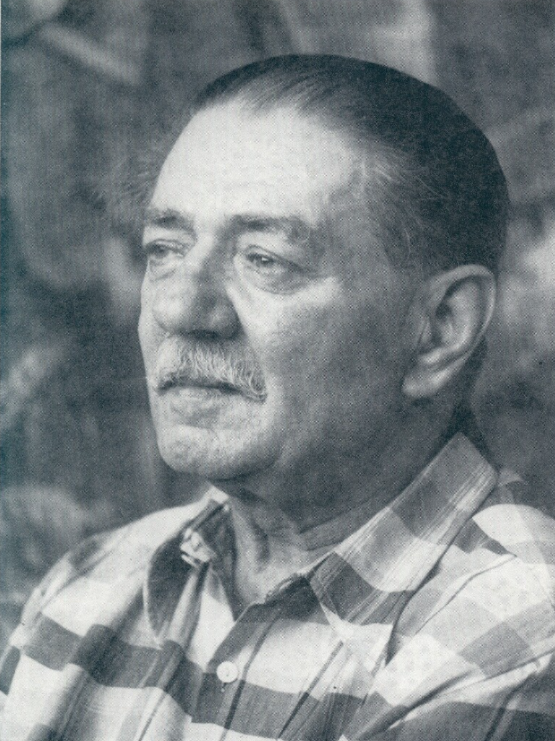
- Zábranský in c. 1970
- Born: 29 November 1909; Rybí, Bohemia, Austria-Hungary
- Died: 9 August 1981 (aged 71); Prague, Czechoslovakia
- Resting place: Vyšehrad Cemetery, Prague
- Education: Academy of Arts, Architecture and Design in Prague; Academy of Fine Arts in Prague

Signature
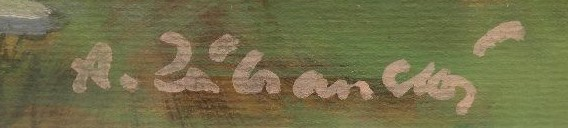

Adolf Zábranský (29 November 1909 – 9 August 1981) was a Czech illustrator, painter and graphic artist. He is best known for illustrating children's books.

== Life ==
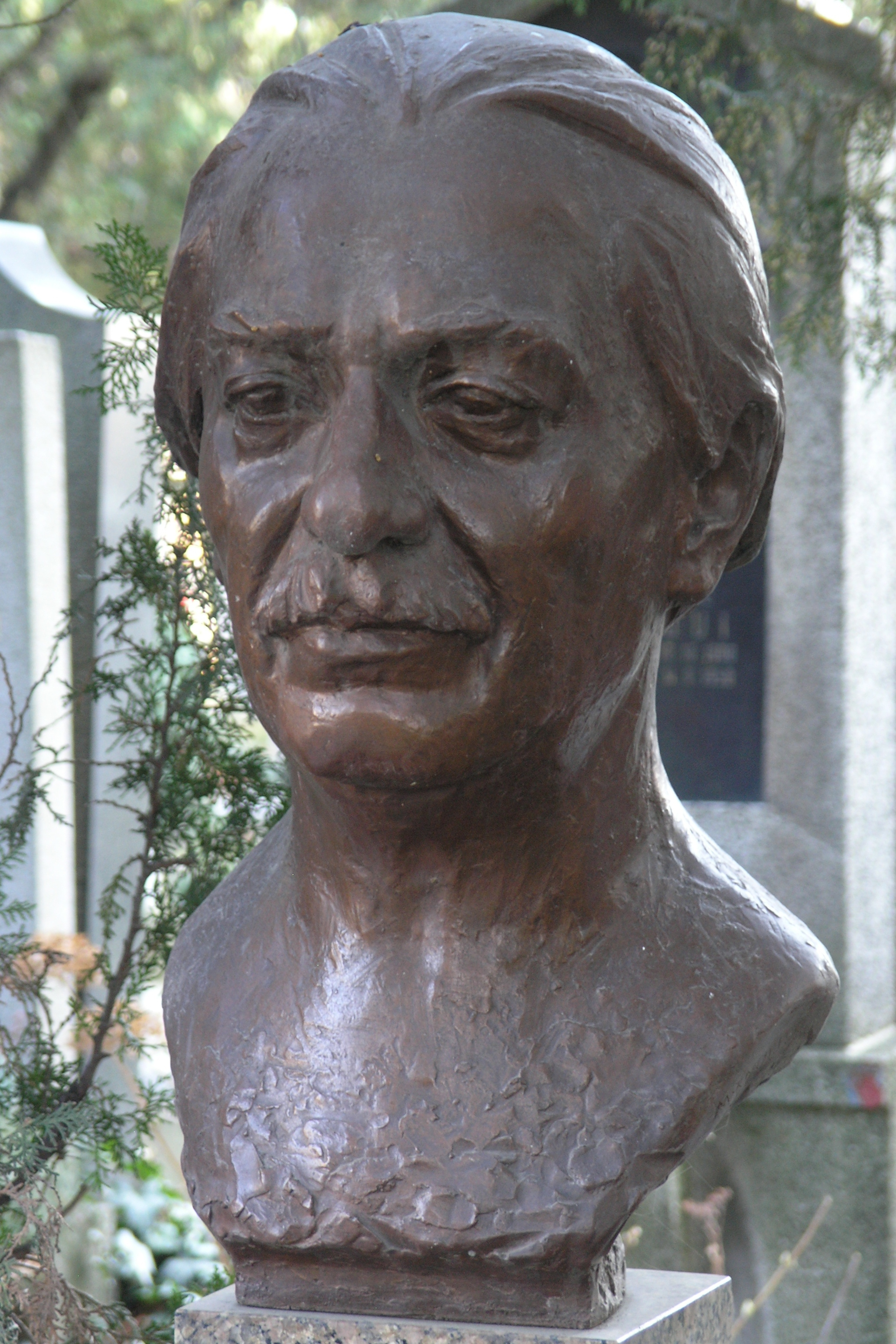
Bust of Adolf Zábranský on his grave

Adolf Zábranský was born on 29 November 1909 in Rybí, into a teacher's family. He graduated from a gymnasium in Valašské Meziříčí. He then studied at the Faculty of Arts, Charles University in Prague, but after a year, he moved to the Academy of Arts, Architecture and Design in Prague (1929–1932). He graduated in general drawing there and then continued his studies at the Academy of Fine Arts in Prague.

Zábranský died on 9 August 1981 in Prague, at the age of 71. He was buried at the Vyšehrad Cemetery in Prague.

== Work ==
The historical motifs of Mikoláš Aleš and Josef Mánes became the model for Zábranský's work. In 1943, he became a member of the Mánes Union of Fine Arts, and from 1949 he was a member of the Union of Czechoslovak Artists. He is best known for his book illustrations. Among the notable books illustrated by Zábranský are the children's books Hanýžka a Martínek and Když se čerti rojili by Jindřich Šimon Baar, Je nám dobře na světě by František Hrubín, Ze starých letopisů by Ivan Olbracht and Národní pohádky a pověsti by Václav Beneš Třebízský.

Zábranský also designed posters (especially after 1950) and painted. He was involved in designs for sgraffito of a monumental decorative nature with elements of socialist realism. He had four solo exhibitions during his lifetime (1943, 1963, 1978, 1980) and several more solo exhibitions posthumously. His work can be found in many important Czech galleries, including National Gallery Prague.

== Honours ==
Zábranský's illustrations have received international recognition. In 1972 he received the Hans Christian Andersen Award.

In 1970, he was awarded by the Czechoslovak State with the title of National Artist. In 1979, he received the Order of Victorious February (awarded for exceptional services to the communist and socialist ideals of the state).

There is a commemorative plaque on Zábranský's birthplace in Rybí (now serving as a primary school).

== See also ==
- List of Czech painters
