= Węgry, Opole Voivodeship =

Węgry Wengern
- Village
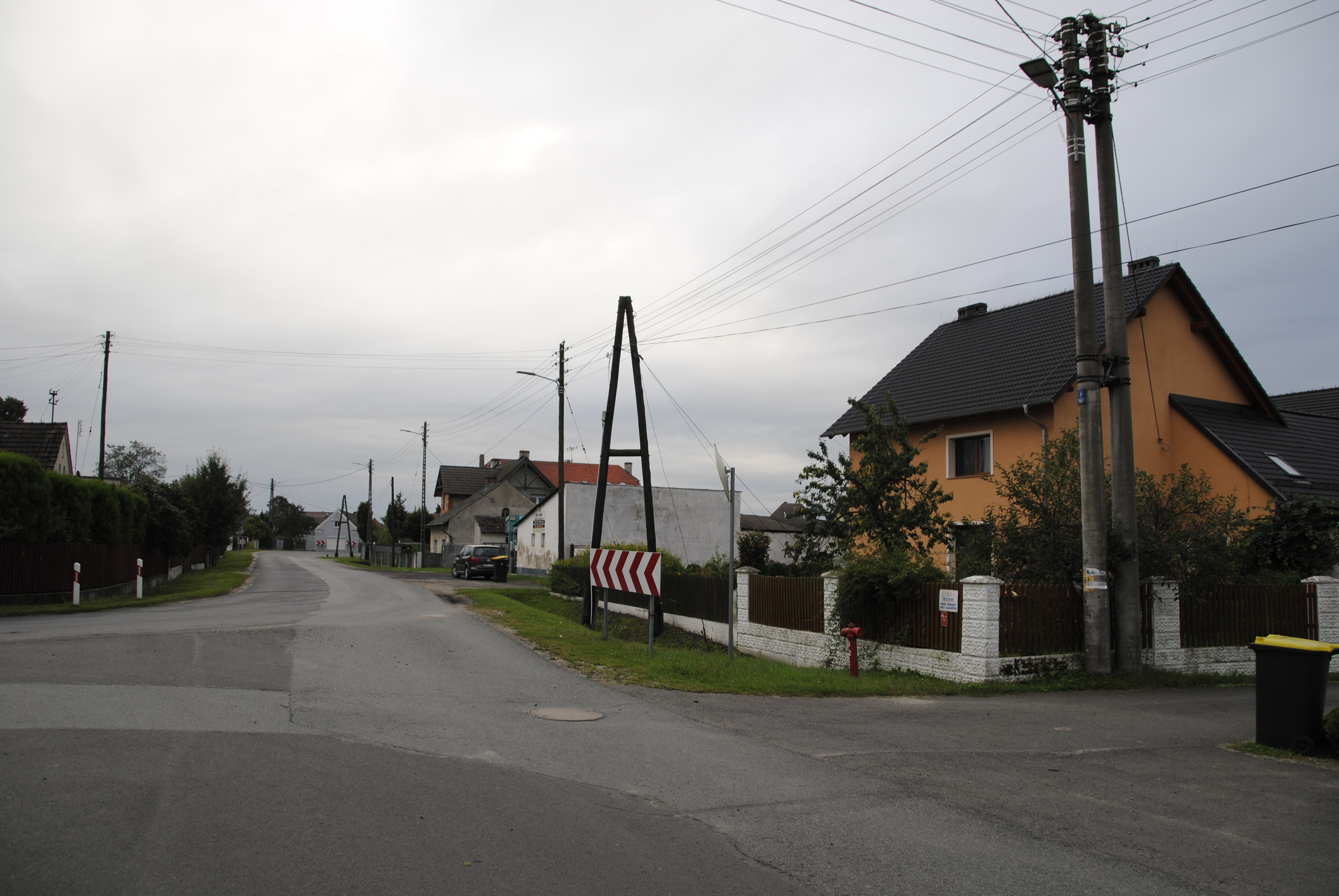

- Location within Poland
- Coordinates: 50°44′35″N 18°1′8″E
- Country: Poland
- Voivodeship: Opole
- County: Opole
- Gmina: Turawa

Population (approx.)
  - Total: 800
- Time zone: UTC+1 (CET)
  - Summer (DST): UTC+2 (CEST)
- Vehicle registration: OPO
- Website: http://wegry.w.interia.pl

Węgry ([ˈvɛnɡrɨ], additional name in German: Wengern) is a village in the administrative district of Gmina Turawa, within Opole County, Opole Voivodeship, in south-western Poland.
