= Kolonowskie =

Kolonowskie Colonnowska
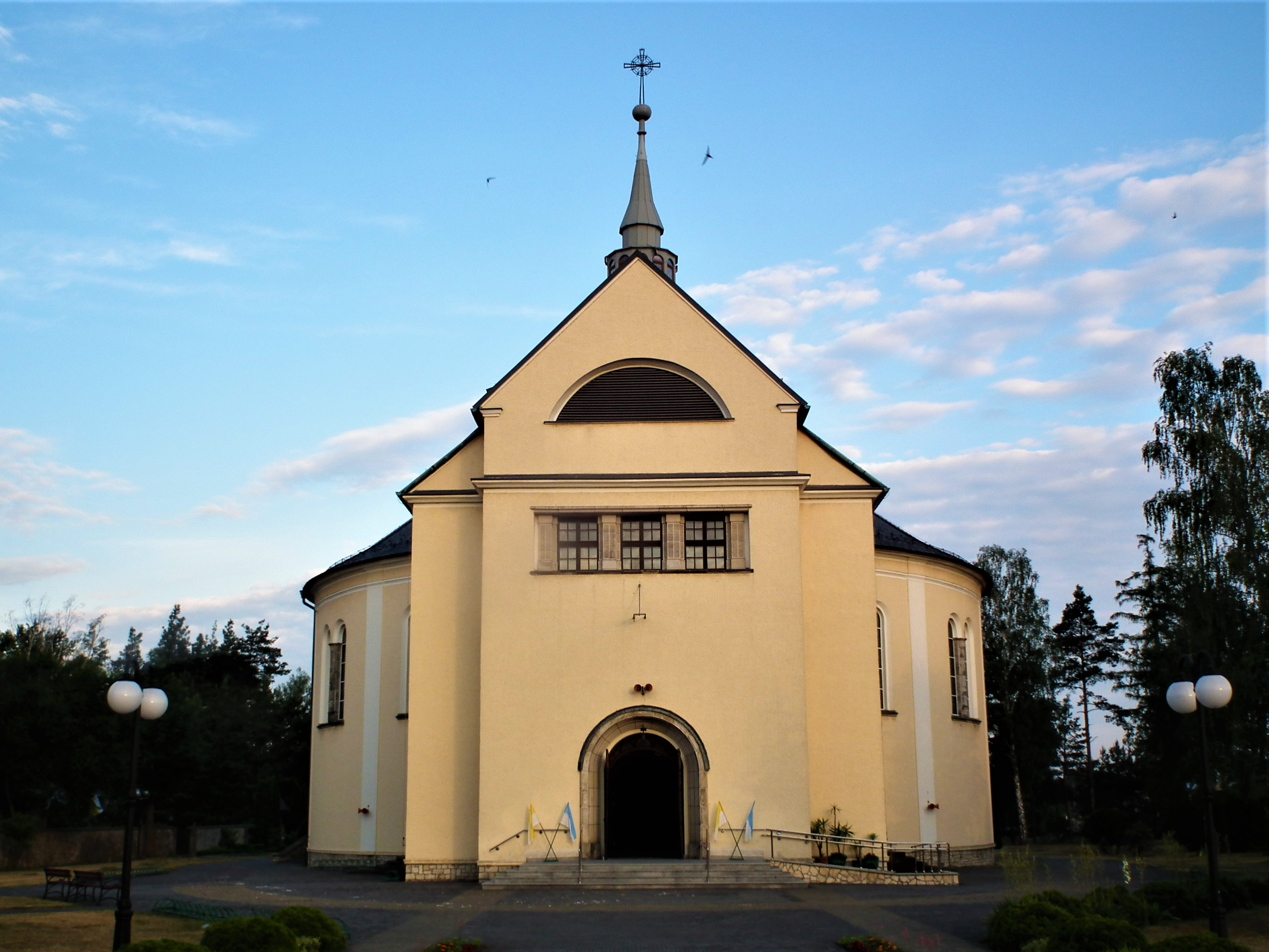
- Church of the Immaculate Heart of Mary in Kolonowskie

- Coat of arms

- Location within Poland
- Coordinates: 50°39′12″N 18°23′03″E
- Country: Poland
- Voivodeship: Opole
- County: Strzelce
- Gmina: Kolonowskie

Area
  - Total: 55.84 km^{2} (21.56 sq mi)

Population (2019-06-30)
  - Total: 3,309
  - Density: 59.26/km^{2} (153.5/sq mi)
- Time zone: UTC+1 (CET)
  - Summer (DST): UTC+2 (CEST)
- Postal code: 47-110
- Vehicle registration: OST
- Website: http://www.kolonowskie.pl

Kolonowskie [kɔlɔˈnɔfskʲɛ] (German: Colonnowska, sometimes Kolonnowska, 1936–1945 Grafenweiler; Silesian: Kolōnowske) is a town in Strzelce County, Opole Voivodeship, Poland, with 3,309 inhabitants (2019). It is the seat of Gmina Kolonowskie which has been officially bilingual in Polish and German since 2006.

It is situated on the Mała Panew River.

== History ==
In 1910, 1,587 Poles lived in the town.

During World War II, Nazi Germans operated the E265 forced labour subcamp of the Stalag VIII-B/344 prisoner-of-war camp in the town, and the E260 and E737 subcamps in the present-day district of Fosowskie.

== Twin towns – sister cities ==
See twin towns of Gmina Kolonowskie.
