= D48 motorway =

Road in the Czech Republic

D48 Motorway
- Dálnice D48

Route information
- Part of E462
- Length: 65.4 km (40.6 mi) Planned: 70 km (43 mi)

Major junctions
- From: D1 near Bělotín
- D56 near Frýdek-Místek
- To: Polish border near Český Těšín

Location
- Country: Czech Republic
- Regions: Olomouc, Moravian-Silesian
- Major cities: Bělotín, Nový Jičín, Frýdek-Místek, Český Těšín

Highway system
- Highways in the Czech Republic
← D46	→ D49

D48 motorway (Czech: Dálnice D48), formerly until December 2015 Expressway R48 (Czech: Rychlostní silnice R48) is a motorway in eastern Czech Republic.

The D48 will connect Bělotín, Nový Jičín, Frýdek-Místek and Český Těšín after its completion. with the Polish S52 expressway. It is part of the European route E462 on the Vienna - Brno - Kraków corridor, and the Chotěbuz border crossing is the busiest border crossing to Poland.

As of December 2024, 65.4 km (40.6 mi) of highway is in operation. Another 3.7 km (2.3 mi) of the motorway is under construction.

== Chronology ==
Expressway sections between Bělotín and few kilometres east of Nový Jičín were built in the 1970s and 1980s, but only as a four-lane main road, so they are too narrow to have expressway parameters.

On Tuesday 15 December 2020, the 11.5 kilometres (7.1 mi) long section between Rybí and Rychaltice was put into operation.

On 2 September 2022, the first part of the Frýdek-Místek bypass was put into operation, including the connection to the D56 motorway. On 22 December 2022, the second part of the bypass was opened in half profile. The entire construction of Phase II of the bypass was completed in April 2023.

In December 2023, the 1st section of the Bělotín - Rybí segment was put into operation.

=== Future development ===
A 3.7 kilometres (2.3 mi) section Dub - Palačov is under construction, since June 2023, planned to be put into operation around 2026.

New junction is also in preparation for a 2028 opening, between Frýdek-Místek and Český Těšín, in the village of Nosovice. A total of 1.2 kilometres (0.75 mi) of the D48 will be reconstructed.

== Images ==
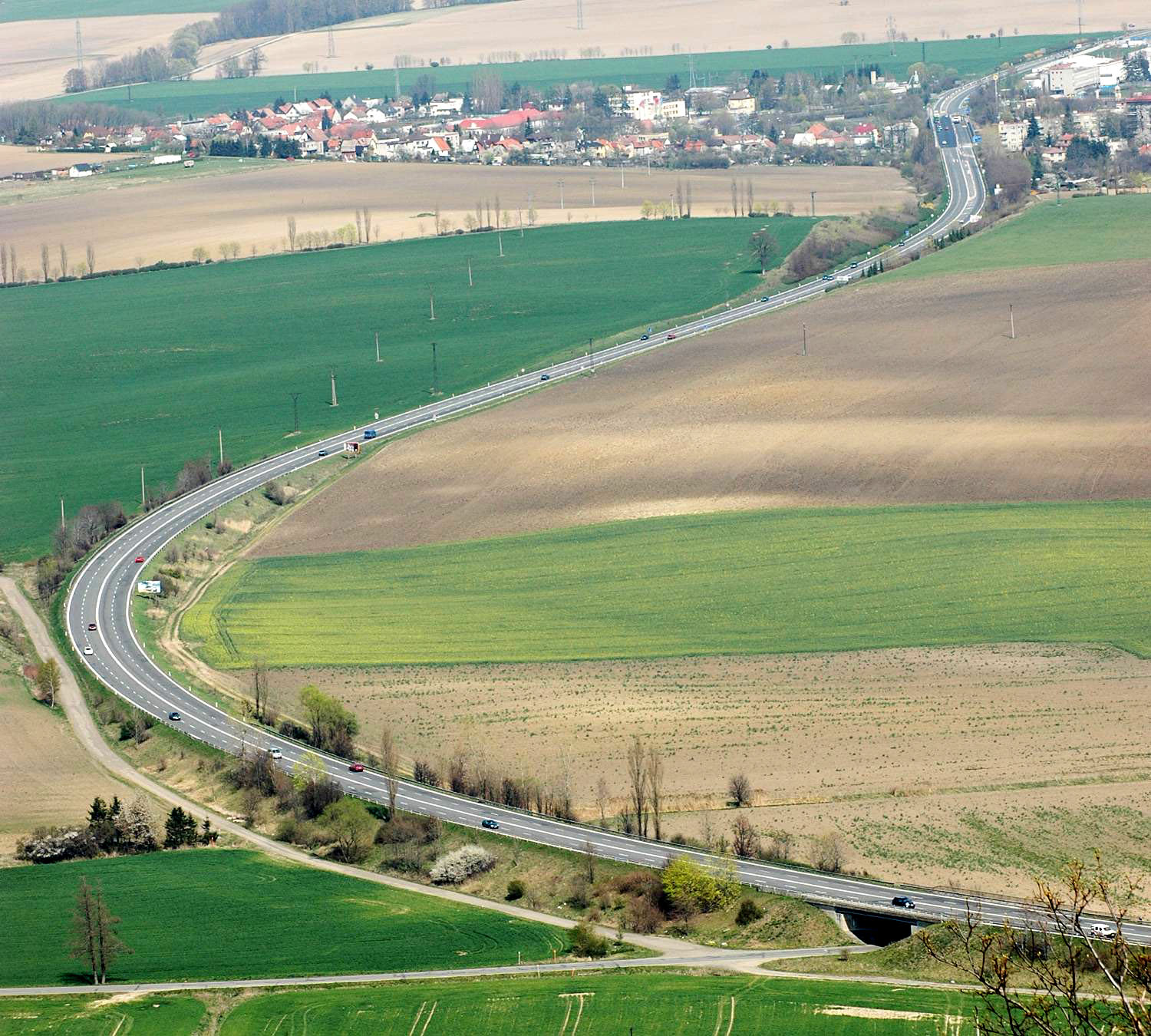
Highway D48 near Nový Jičín.

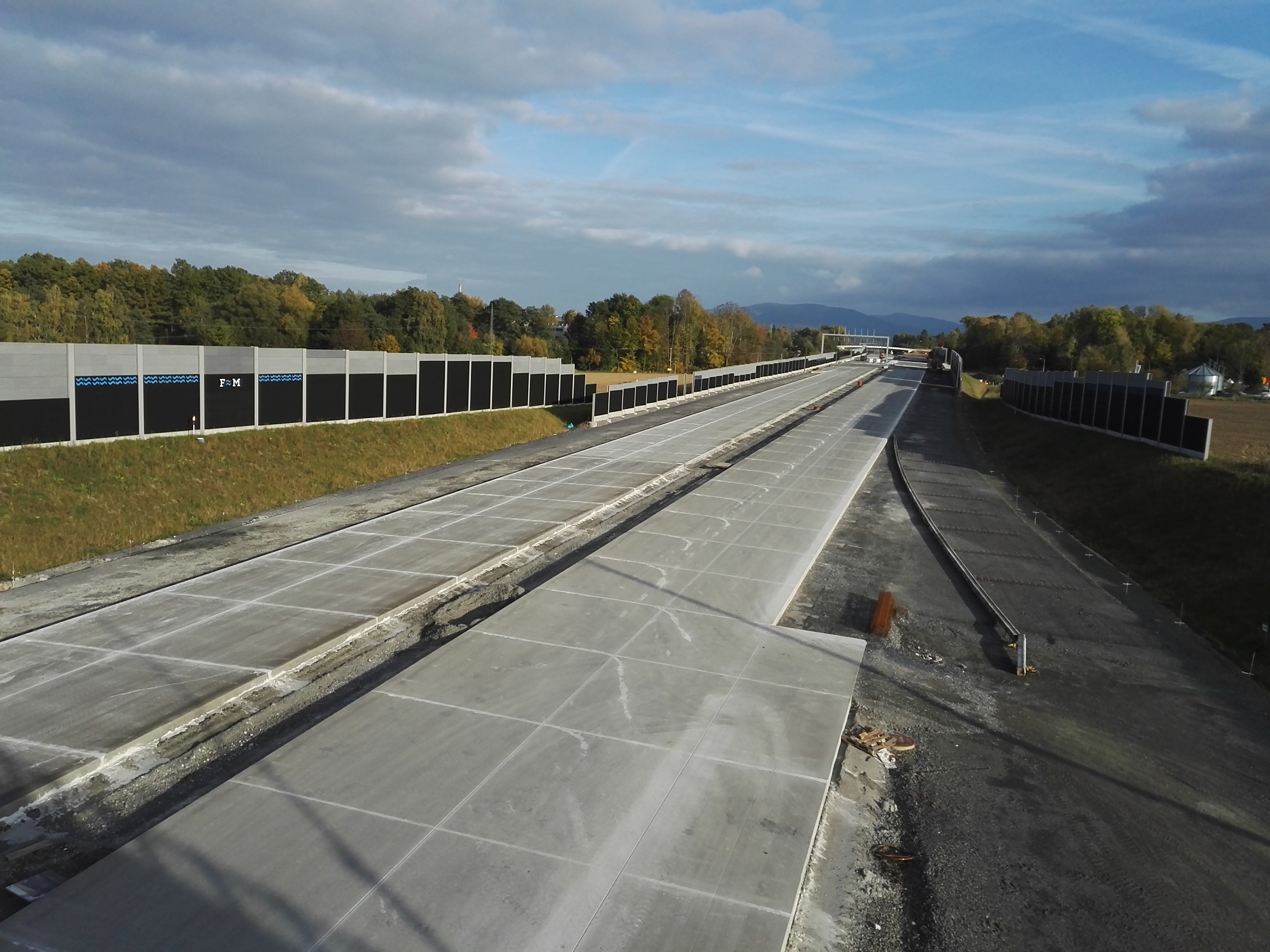
Construction of D48 highway.
