= Rybí =

- Municipality
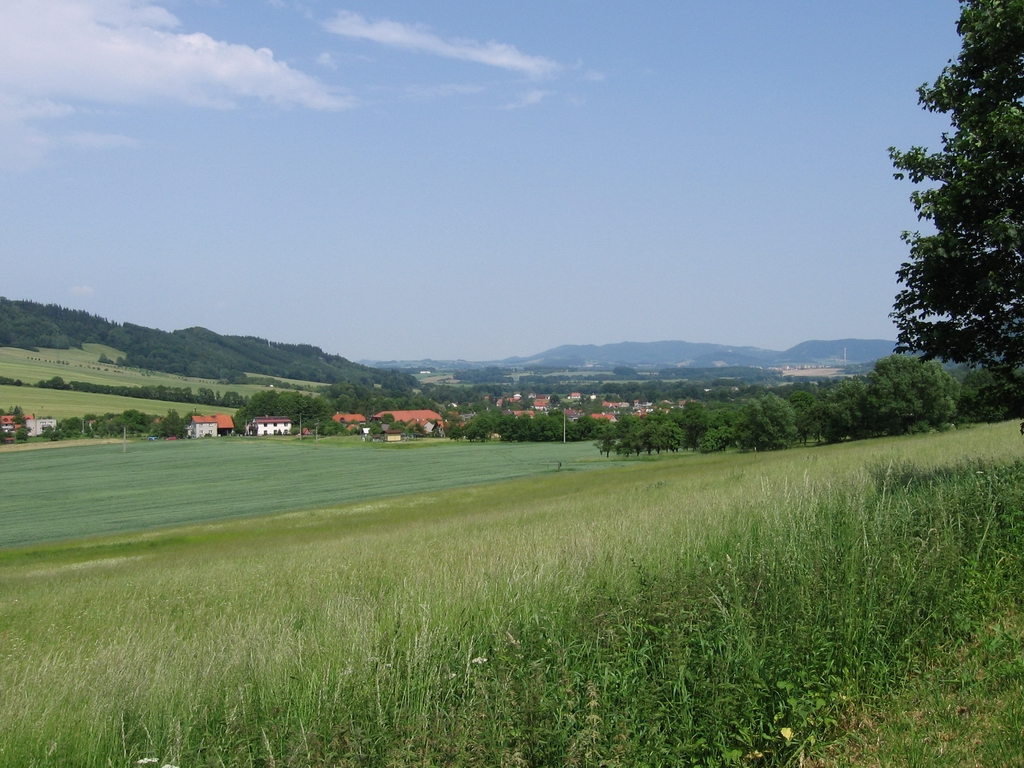
- View of Rybí from Holivák

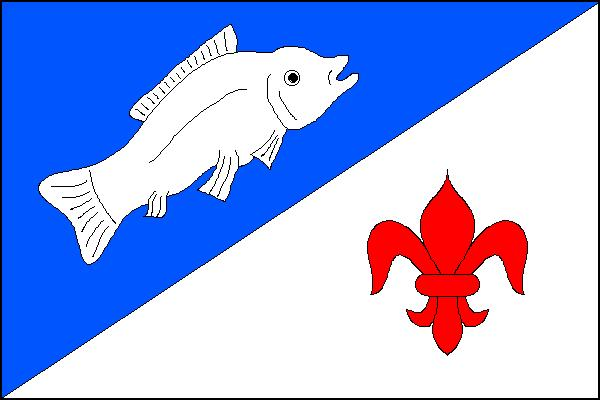
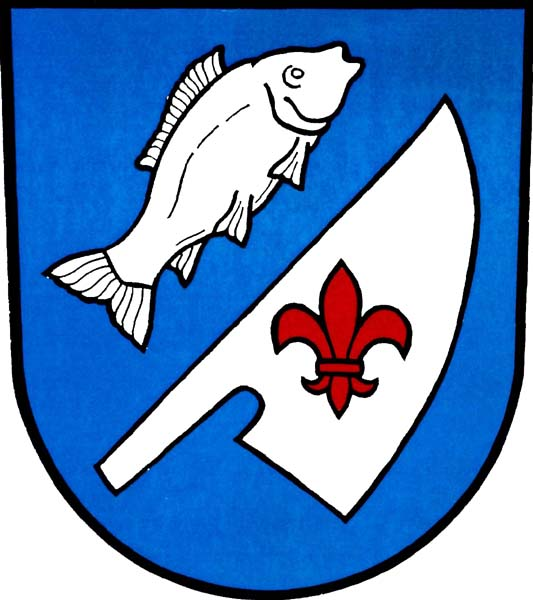
- Flag Coat of arms

- Location in the Czech Republic
- Coordinates: 49°36′3″N 18°4′33″E
- Country: Czech Republic
- Region: Moravian-Silesian
- District: Nový Jičín
- Founded: 1397

Area
  - Total: 9.01 km^{2} (3.48 sq mi)
- Elevation: 326 m (1,070 ft)

Population (2026-01-01)
  - Total: 1,263
  - Density: 140/km^{2} (363/sq mi)
- Time zone: UTC+1 (CET)
  - Summer (DST): UTC+2 (CEST)
- Postal code: 742 65
- Website: www.rybi.cz

Rybí (German: Reimlich) is a municipality and village in Nový Jičín District in the Moravian-Silesian Region of the Czech Republic. It has about 1,300 inhabitants.

== Etymology ==
The name is derived from the watercourse Rybí potok (literally 'fish stream'), which is today called Rybský potok.

== Geography ==
Rybí is located about 5 kilometres (3 mi) east of Nový Jičín and 25 km (16 mi) southwest of Ostrava. It lies in the Moravian-Silesian Foothills. The highest point is the hill Libhošťská hůrka at 494 m (1,621 ft) above sea level. The stream Rybský potok flows through the municipality.

== History ==
Rybí was founded in 1397. According to local legends, Rybí existed already in 1241, but was destroyed by a Tatar raid.

== Demographics ==
Historical population

Year	Pop.	±%
1869	788	—
1880	817	+3.7%
1890	890	+8.9%
1900	905	+1.7%
1910	1,005	+11.0%

Year	Pop.	±%
1921	1,046	+4.1%
1930	1,140	+9.0%
1950	1,096	−3.9%
1961	1,232	+12.4%
1970	1,122	−8.9%

Year	Pop.	±%
1980	1,065	−5.1%
1991	1,092	+2.5%
2001	1,062	−2.7%
2011	1,136	+7.0%
2021	1,182	+4.0%

Source: Censuses

== Transport ==
The D48 motorway (the section from Nový Jičín to Frýdek-Místek) runs along the northern municipal border.

== Sport ==
Rybí is suitable for skiing in the winter season. There is a small ski resort with two platter ski lifts, one 200 m long and the other 450 m long.

== Sights ==
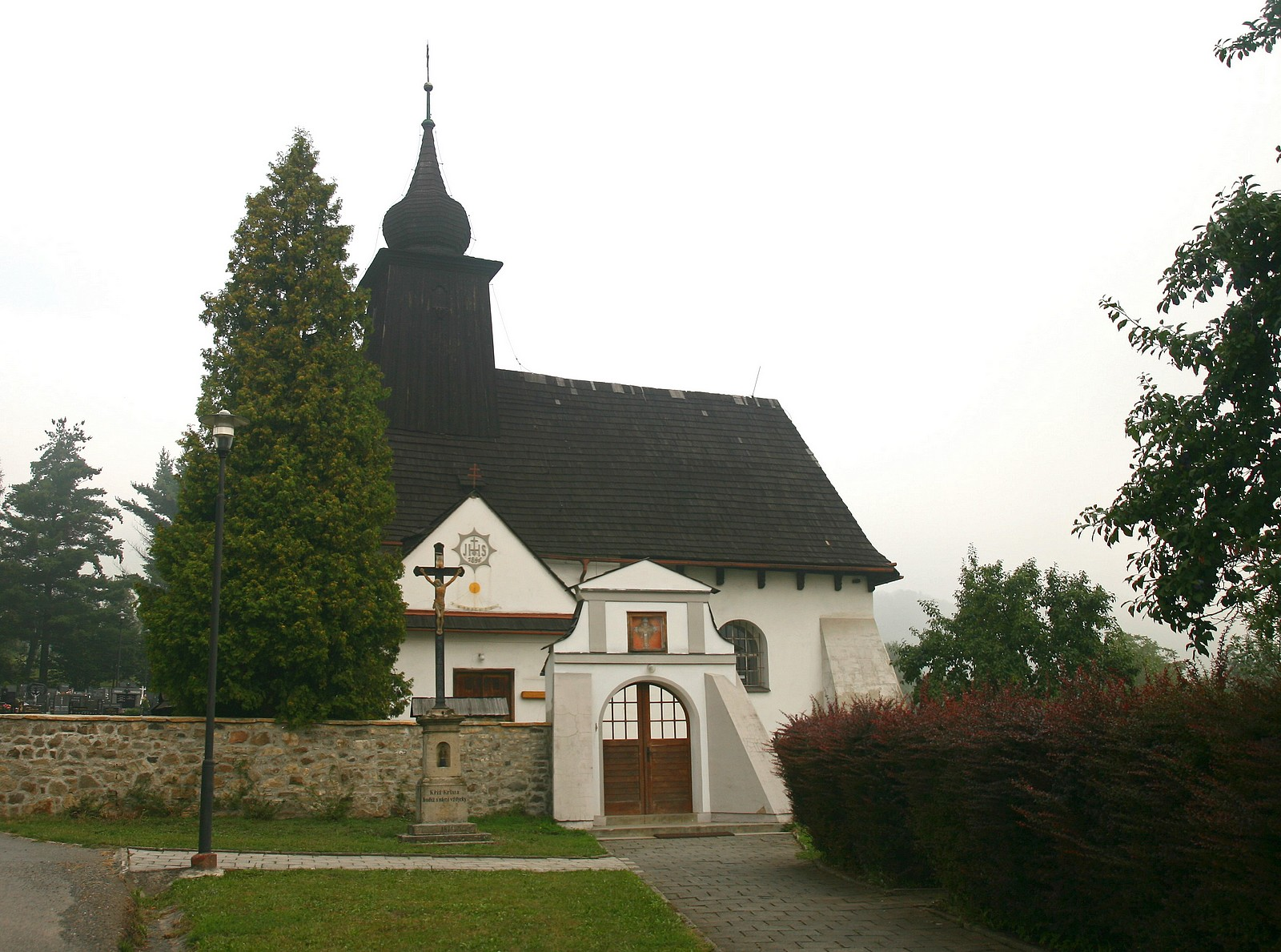
Church of the Finding of the Holy Cross

The most important monument is the Church of the Finding of the Holy Cross. Other sights include two chapels that commemorate the former massive pilgrimage procession of the faithful, and glacial erratics.

== Notable people ==
- Adolf Zábranský (1909–1981), painter and illustrator
