= Staniszcze Wielkie =

Staniszcze Wielkie Groß Stanisch
- Village
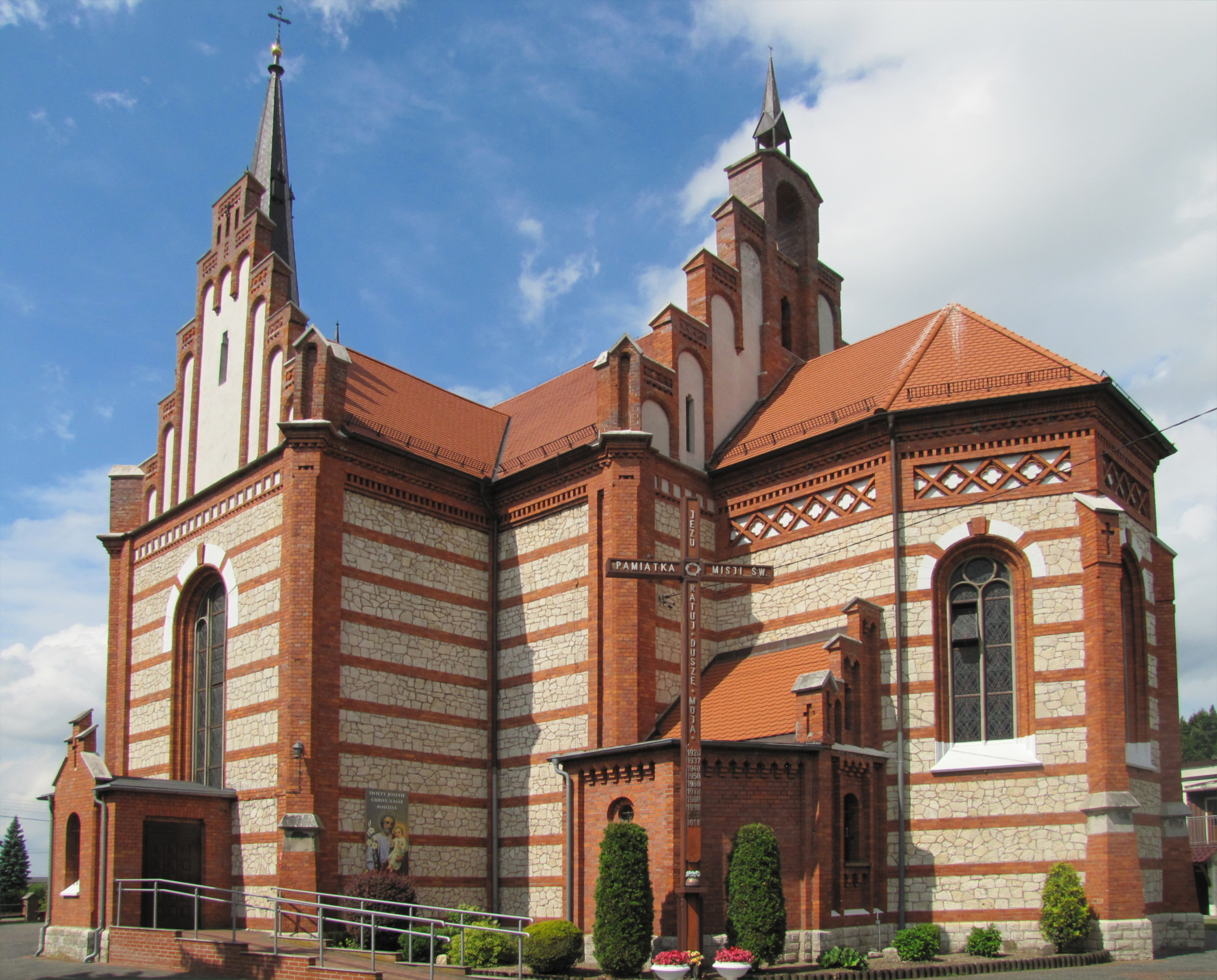
- Church of Saint Charles Borromeo

- Location within Poland
- Coordinates: 50°38′56″N 18°20′56″E
- Country: Poland
- Voivodeship: Opole
- County: Strzelce
- Gmina: Kolonowskie

Population
  - Total: 1,169
- Time zone: UTC+1 (CET)
  - Summer (DST): UTC+2 (CEST)
- Vehicle registration: OST

Staniszcze Wielkie ([staˈniʂt͡ʂɛ ˈvjɛlkʲɛ], additional name in German: Groß Stanisch) is a village in the administrative district of Gmina Kolonowskie, within Strzelce County, Opole Voivodeship, in southern Poland.
