= Zawada, Gmina Turawa =

Zawada Sowade
- Village
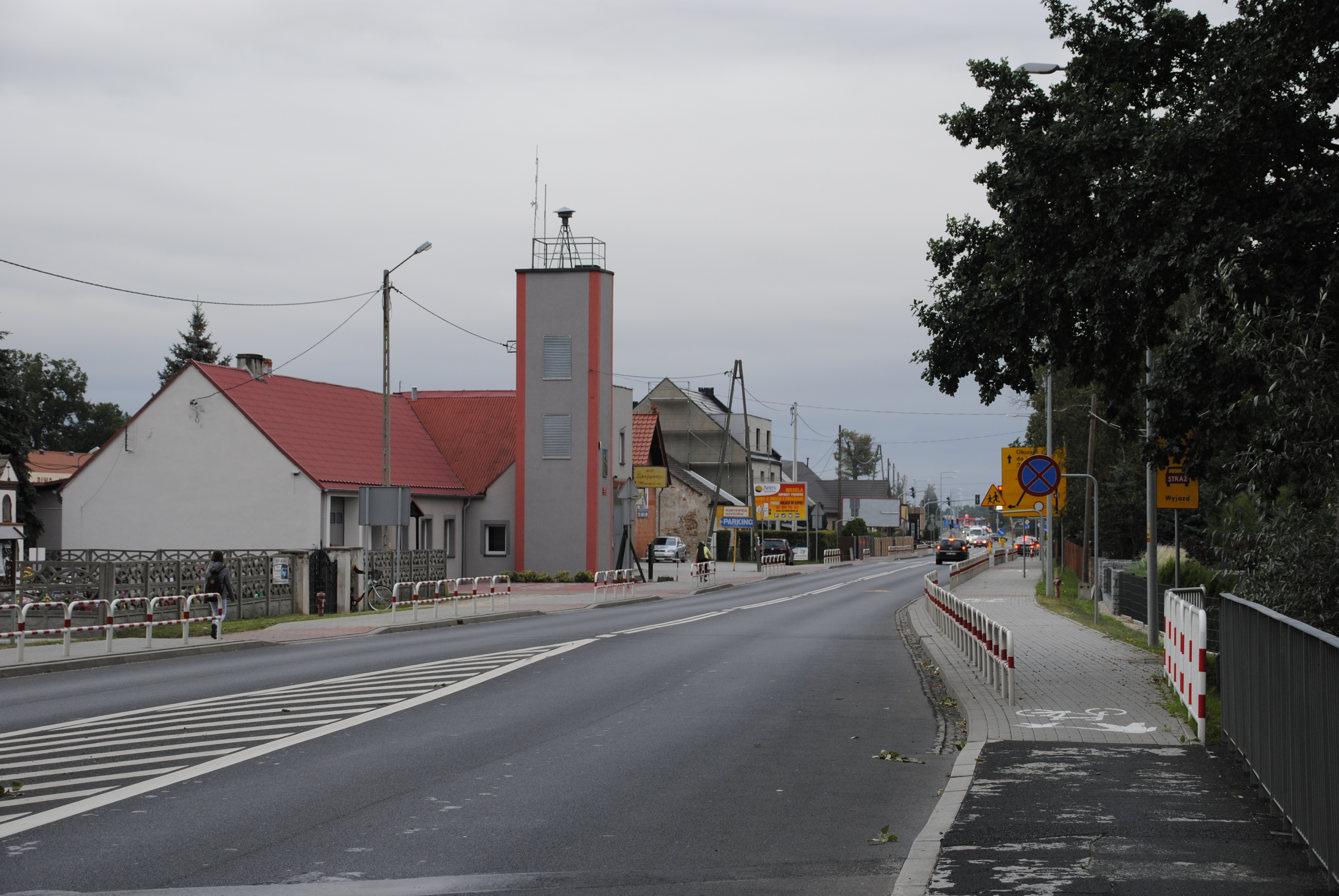

- Location within Poland
- Coordinates: 50°42′49″N 17°59′37″E
- Country: Poland
- Voivodeship: Opole
- County: Opole
- Gmina: Turawa

Population
  - Total: 1,200
- Time zone: UTC+1 (CET)
  - Summer (DST): UTC+2 (CEST)
- Vehicle registration: OPO

Zawada ([zaˈvada], additional name in German: Sowade) is a village in the administrative district of Gmina Turawa, within Opole County, Opole Voivodeship, in south-western Poland.
