= Gmina Turawa =

Gmina Turawa Gemeinde Turawa Turawa Commune
- Gmina
- Coat of arms
- Interactive map of Gmina Turawa
- Coordinates (Turawa): 50°45′N 18°4′E
- Country: Poland
- Voivodeship: Opole
- County: Opole
- Seat: Turawa

Area
  - Total: 171.46 km^{2} (66.20 sq mi)

Population (2019-06-30)
  - Total: 9,990
  - Density: 58.3/km^{2} (151/sq mi)
- Time zone: UTC+1 (CET)
  - Summer (DST): UTC+2 (CEST)
- Vehicle registration: OPO
- Website: http://turawa.pl/

Gmina Turawa (German: Gemeinde Turawa) is a rural gmina (administrative district) in Opole County, Opole Voivodeship, in south-western Poland. Its seat is the village of Turawa, which lies approximately 14 kilometres (9 mi) north-east of the regional capital Opole.

The gmina covers an area of 171.46 square kilometres (66.2 sq mi), and as of 2019 its total population is 9,990.

== Villages ==
The commune contains the villages and settlements of:

- Turawa
- Bierdzany
- Borek
- Kadłub Turawski
- Kotórz Mały
- Kotórz Wielki
- Ligota Turawska
- Marszałki
- Osowiec Śląski
- Rzędzów
- Trzęsina
- Węgry
- Zakrzów Turawski
- Zawada

== Demographics ==
As of 31 December 2010, the commune had 9,595 inhabitants. At the time of the census of 2002, the commune had 9,609 inhabitants. Of these, 5,673 (59%) declared the Polish nationality; 2,028 persons (21.1%) declared the German nationality; and 671 (7%) with the non-recognized Silesian nationality. 1,223 inhabitants (12.7%) declared no nationality.

== Neighbouring gminas ==
Gmina Turawa is bordered by the city of Opole and by the gminas of Chrząstowice, Lasowice Wielkie, Łubniany, Ozimek and Zębowice.

== Notable people ==
- Joachim Prinz (1902–1988), Rabbi

== Twin towns – sister cities ==
Gmina Turawa is twinned with:

- Dřevohostice, Czech Republic
- Saalfelder Höhe (Saalfeld), Germany
- Wetter, Germany
