= Borek, Gmina Turawa =

Borek
- Village
- Location within Poland
- Coordinates: 50°43′12″N 18°0′32″E
- Country: Poland
- Voivodeship: Opole
- County: Opole
- Gmina: Turawa

Borek [ˈbɔrɛk] is a village in the administrative district of Gmina Turawa, within Opole County, Opole Voivodeship, in south-western Poland.
