= Spórok =

Spórok Carmerau
- Village
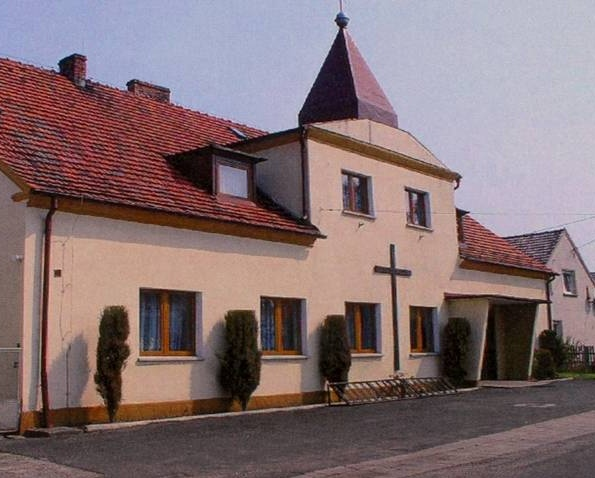
- Church of Saint Florian

- Location within Poland
- Coordinates: 50°38′N 18°17′E
- Country: Poland
- Voivodeship: Opole
- County: Strzelce
- Gmina: Kolonowskie
- Founded: 1776

Population
  - Total: 667
- Time zone: UTC+1 (CET)
  - Summer (DST): UTC+2 (CEST)
- Vehicle registration: OST

Spórok ([ˈspurɔk], additional name in German: Carmerau) is a village in the administrative district of Gmina Kolonowskie, within Strzelce County, Opole Voivodeship, in southern Poland.

As of 31 December 2021, the village's population numbered 586 inhabitants. A significant portion of them belongs to the German minority in Poland.

== Etymology ==
The name Carmerau was derived from the name Carmer. In Topographisches Handbuch von Oberschlesien, published in 1865, Felix Triest noted the village's Polish name as Sporók.

Following the Second World War, the Polish name Sporok was introduced by the Commission for the Determination of Place Names. However, the name was not adopted by the local population, who instead called the village Spórok. As Gmina Kolonowskie gained the bilingual status on 14 November 2008, the government introduced an additional German name for the village: Carmerau.

== History ==
The village was established in 1776 by a man named Carmer. The colony of Spórok was initially divided between two counties: Strzelce and Opole.
