= Kotórz Mały =

Kotórz Mały Klein Kottorz
- Village
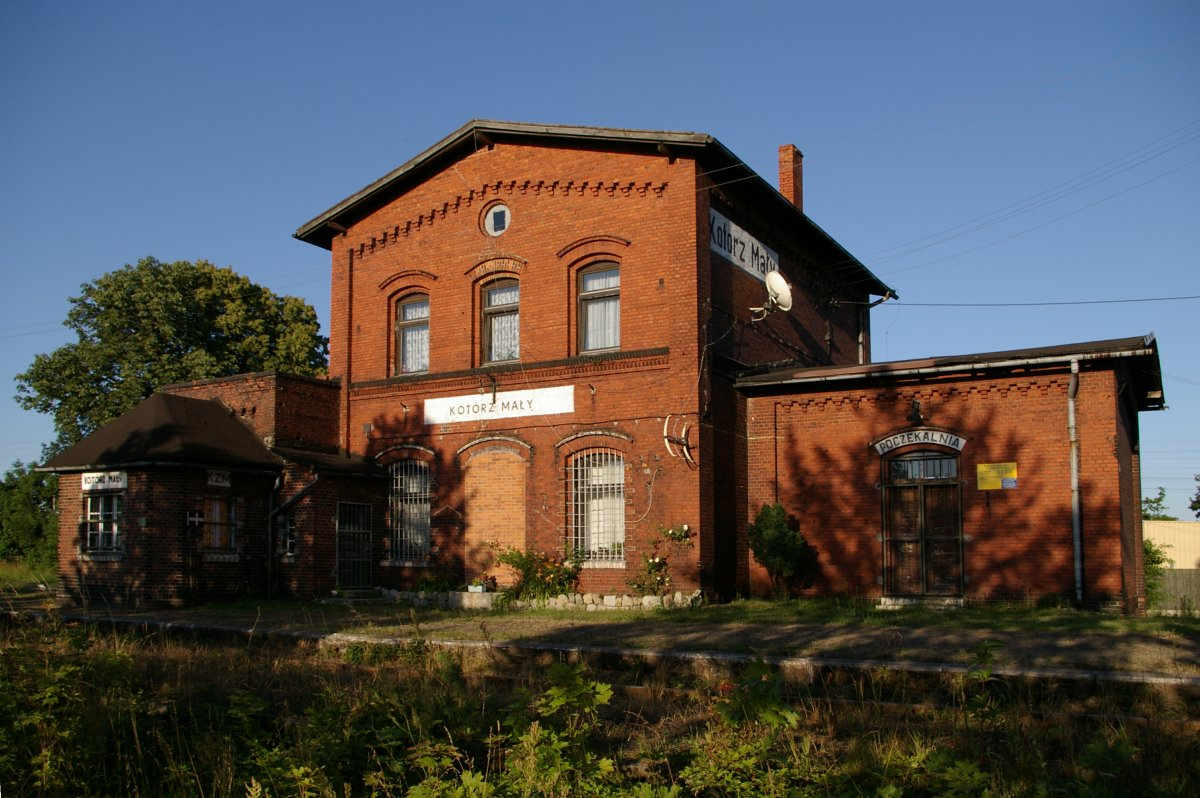
- Railway station

- Location within Poland
- Coordinates: 50°44′N 18°3′E
- Country: Poland
- Voivodeship: Opole
- County: Opole
- Gmina: Turawa

Population
  - Total: 930
- Time zone: UTC+1 (CET)
  - Summer (DST): UTC+2 (CEST)
- Vehicle registration: OPO

Kotórz Mały ([ˈkɔtuʂ ˈmawɨ], additional name in German: Klein Kottorz) is a village in the administrative district of Gmina Turawa, within Opole County, Opole Voivodeship, in south-western Poland.
