= Staniszcze Małe =

Staniszcze Małe Klein Stanisch
- Village
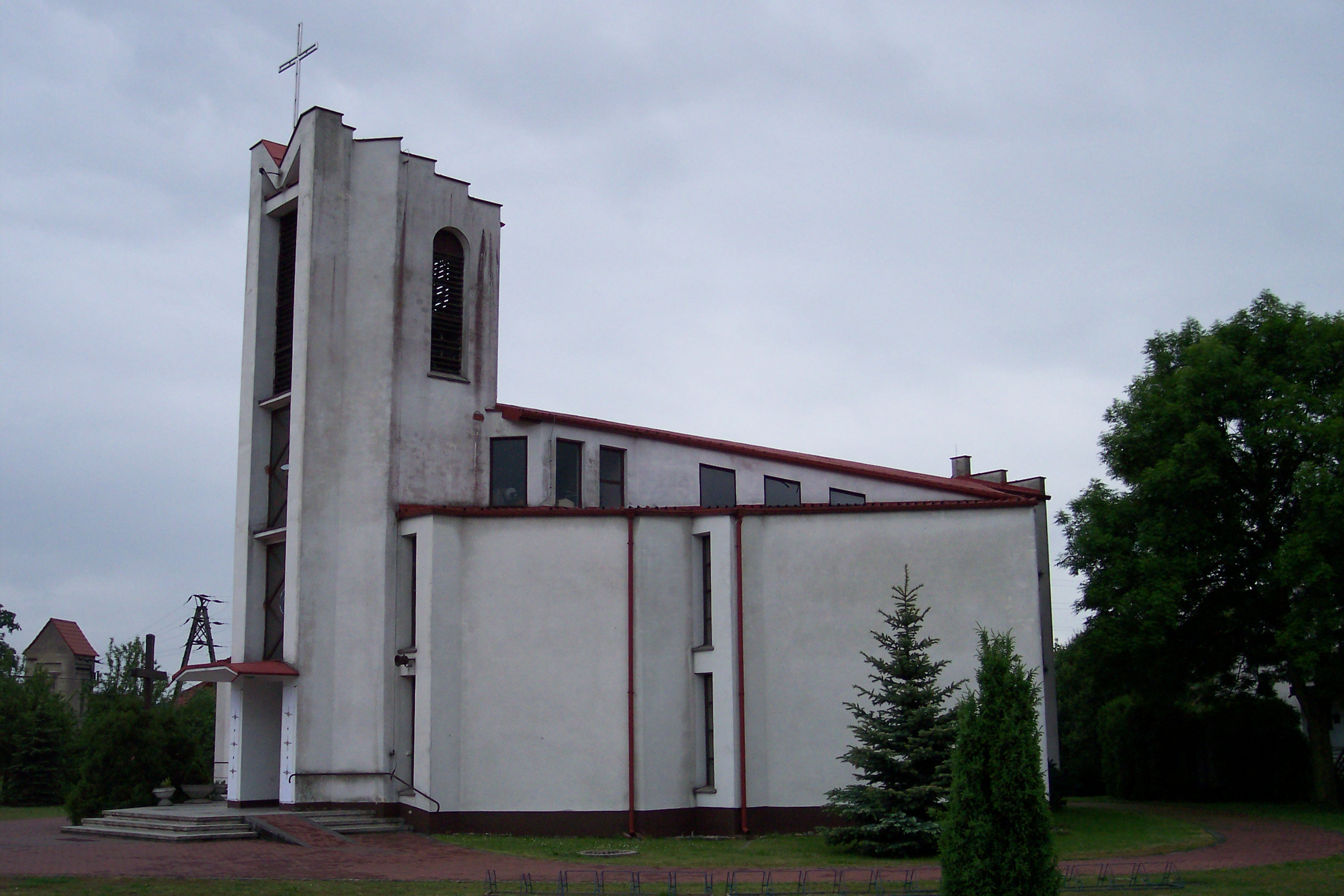
- Church of the Holy Spirit

- Location within Poland
- Coordinates: 50°39′46″N 18°19′0″E
- Country: Poland
- Voivodeship: Opole
- County: Strzelce
- Gmina: Kolonowskie
- Elevation: 190 m (620 ft)

Population (approx.)
  - Total: 700
- Time zone: UTC+1 (CET)
  - Summer (DST): UTC+2 (CEST)
- Vehicle registration: OST

Staniszcze Małe ([staˈniʂt͡ʂɛ ˈmawɛ], additional name in German: Klein Stanisch) is a village in the administrative district of Gmina Kolonowskie, within Strzelce County, Opole Voivodeship, in southern Poland.
