= Rzędzów =

Rzędów Friedrichsfelde
- Village
- Location within Poland
- Coordinates: 50°44′N 18°9′E
- Country: Poland
- Voivodeship: Opole
- County: Opole
- Gmina: Turawa

Population (approx.)
  - Total: 312
- Time zone: UTC+1 (CET)
  - Summer (DST): UTC+2 (CEST)
- Vehicle registration: OPO

Rzędów ([ˈʐɛnduf], additional name in German: Friedrichsfelde) is a village in the administrative district of Gmina Turawa, within Opole County, Opole Voivodeship, in south-western Poland.

== History ==
The village of Friedrichsfelde was founded as a colony in the 18th century. In 1840 the colony had 224 inhabitants.

It was renamed in 1945, after the region became again part of Poland under the terms of the Potsdam Agreement.
