= Bělotín =

- Municipality
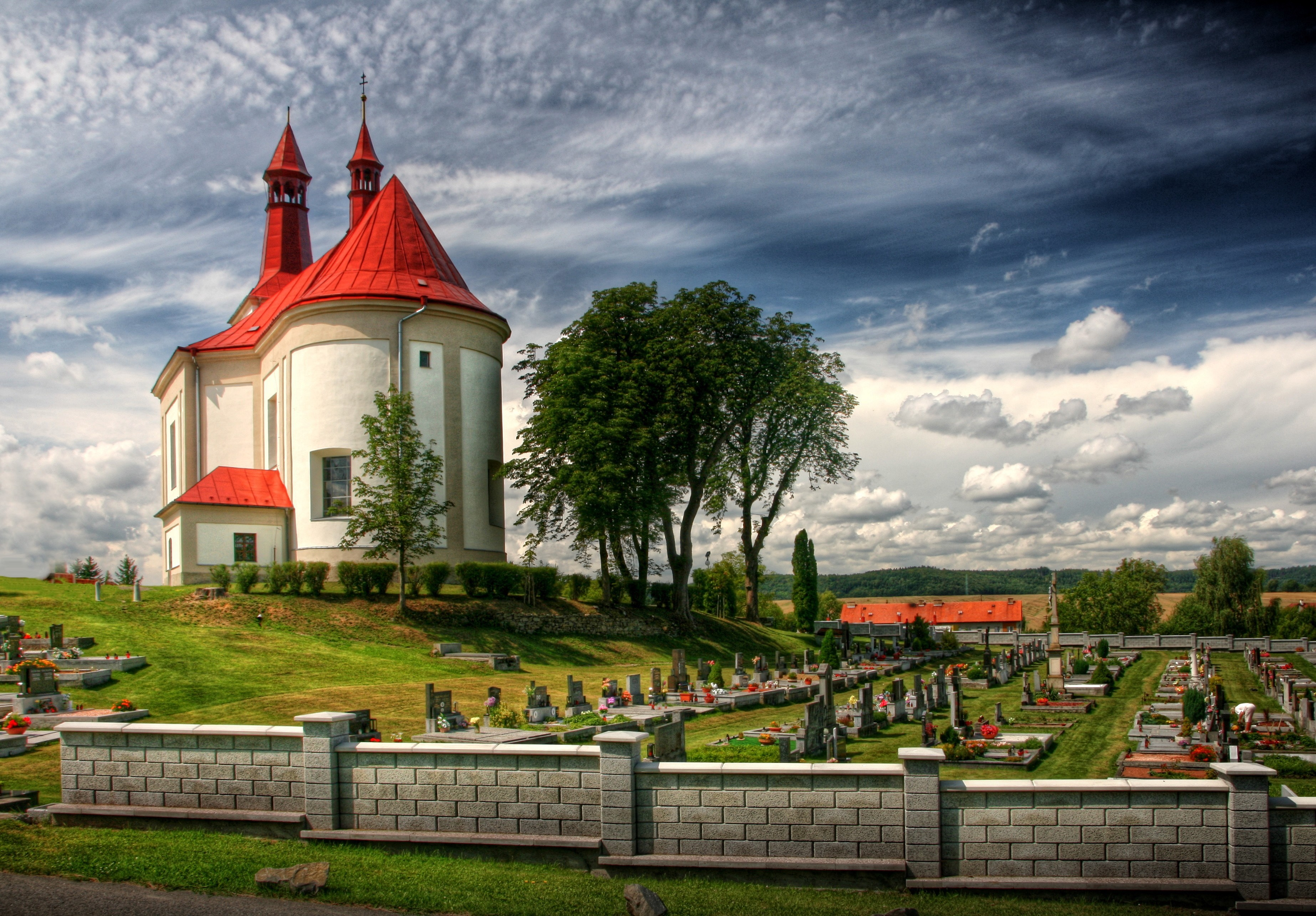
- Church of Saint George

- Flag Coat of arms

- Location in the Czech Republic
- Coordinates: 49°35′28″N 17°48′24″E
- Country: Czech Republic
- Region: Olomouc
- District: Přerov
- First mentioned: 1201

Area
  - Total: 33.39 km^{2} (12.89 sq mi)
- Elevation: 297 m (974 ft)

Population (2026-01-01)
  - Total: 1,883
  - Density: 56.39/km^{2} (146.1/sq mi)
- Time zone: UTC+1 (CET)
  - Summer (DST): UTC+2 (CEST)
- Postal code: 753 64
- Website: www.belotin.cz

Bělotín (German: Bölten) is a municipality and village in Přerov District in the Olomouc Region of the Czech Republic. It has about 1,900 inhabitants.

== Administrative division ==
Bělotín consists of four municipal parts (in brackets population according to the 2021 census):

- Bělotín (1,232)
- Kunčice (259)
- Lučice (107)
- Nejdek (150)

== Geography ==
Bělotín is located about 29 kilometres (18 mi) northeast of Přerov and 38 km (24 mi) east of Olomouc. It lies mostly in the Moravian Gate valley. The northern part of the municipal territory lies in the Nízký Jeseník range and includes the highest point of Bělotín at 481 m (1,578 ft) above sea level. In the south, the municipality also extends into the Moravian-Silesian Foothills.

The Luha River flows across the municipality. The village of Bělotín is mostly located around the stream Bělotínský potok, which flows to the Luha. There are two notable fishponds in the municipality: Horní Bělotín and Dolní Bělotín.

=== Climate ===
Bělotín's climate is classified as humid continental climate (Köppen: Dfb; Trewartha: Dcbo). Among them, the annual average temperature is 8.9 °C (48.0 °F), the hottest month in July is 19.2 °C (66.6 °F), and the coldest month is −1.7 °C (28.9 °F) in January. The annual precipitation is 650.2 millimetres (25.60 in), of which July is the wettest with 86.0 millimetres (3.39 in), while February is the driest with only 33.3 millimetres (1.31 in). The extreme temperature throughout the year ranged from −27.7 °C (−17.9 °F) on 8 January 1985 to 37.5 °C (99.5 °F) on 8 August 2013.

Climate data for Bělotín, 1991–2020 normals, extremes 1983–present
Month	Jan	Feb	Mar	Apr	May	Jun	Jul	Aug	Sep	Oct	Nov	Dec	Year
Record high °C (°F)	13.7 (56.7)	16.7 (62.1)	21.8 (71.2)	29.5 (85.1)	31.0 (87.8)	34.8 (94.6)	36.7 (98.1)	37.5 (99.5)	32.9 (91.2)	25.8 (78.4)	21.9 (71.4)	15.3 (59.5)	37.5 (99.5)
Mean daily maximum °C (°F)	0.9 (33.6)	3.3 (37.9)	8.1 (46.6)	14.9 (58.8)	19.4 (66.9)	23.1 (73.6)	25.4 (77.7)	25.4 (77.7)	19.5 (67.1)	13.4 (56.1)	7.3 (45.1)	2.0 (35.6)	13.6 (56.5)
Daily mean °C (°F)	−1.7 (28.9)	−0.2 (31.6)	3.5 (38.3)	9.2 (48.6)	13.8 (56.8)	17.4 (63.3)	19.2 (66.6)	18.9 (66.0)	13.8 (56.8)	8.8 (47.8)	4.3 (39.7)	−0.4 (31.3)	8.9 (48.0)
Mean daily minimum °C (°F)	−4.5 (23.9)	−3.6 (25.5)	−0.6 (30.9)	3.4 (38.1)	7.7 (45.9)	11.2 (52.2)	12.9 (55.2)	12.7 (54.9)	8.9 (48.0)	5.0 (41.0)	1.4 (34.5)	−3.0 (26.6)	4.3 (39.7)
Record low °C (°F)	−27.7 (−17.9)	−24.0 (−11.2)	−18.9 (−2.0)	−7.7 (18.1)	−2.3 (27.9)	2.0 (35.6)	3.6 (38.5)	2.6 (36.7)	−0.5 (31.1)	−8.5 (16.7)	−17.1 (1.2)	−24.4 (−11.9)	−27.7 (−17.9)
Average precipitation mm (inches)	34.9 (1.37)	33.3 (1.31)	38.5 (1.52)	39.9 (1.57)	72.4 (2.85)	81.6 (3.21)	86.0 (3.39)	67.9 (2.67)	67.2 (2.65)	47.9 (1.89)	42.7 (1.68)	37.9 (1.49)	650.2 (25.60)
Average snowfall cm (inches)	22.7 (8.9)	20.0 (7.9)	9.6 (3.8)	1.6 (0.6)	0.0 (0.0)	0.0 (0.0)	0.0 (0.0)	0.0 (0.0)	0.0 (0.0)	0.2 (0.1)	5.9 (2.3)	17.8 (7.0)	77.8 (30.6)
Average relative humidity (%)	86.4	82.1	76.1	69.0	72.2	73.1	72.6	72.7	79.3	83.6	86.4	87.5	78.4
Mean monthly sunshine hours	36.4	66.1	122.7	184.6	211.1	216.7	226.0	222.8	150.9	99.7	46.9	32.4	1,616.2
Source: Czech Hydrometeorological Institute

== History ==
The first written mention of Bělotín is from 1201. The village was founded in the second half of the 12th century. Until the German colonisation in the 14th century, the population was purely Slavic.

Until the turn of the 14th and 15th centuries, Bělotín was owned by the Hradisko Monastery as a part of the Hranice estate. In 1475, the estate was acquired by the Pernštejn family, then it was sold to the Haugwitz of Biskupice family (a branch of the Haugwitz family) in 1548. After it changed its owners several times, the estate was confiscated after the Battle of White Mountain and donated to Franz von Dietrichstein. His house held Bělotín and the whole Hranice estate until 1858.

During World War II, Bělotín was annexed by Nazi Germany and administered as part of the Reichsgau Sudetenland. The municipality was the base for a detached Work Camp E540 (Arbeitskommando E540) for British and Commonwealth prisoners of war, under the administration of the Stalag VIII-B/344 prisoner-of-war camp at Łambinowice. In January 1945, as the Soviet armies resumed their offensive and advanced from the east, the prisoners of the whole Stalag VIII-B/344 POW camp were marched westward in the Long March.

== Demographics ==
Historical population

Year	Pop.	±%
1869	2,170	—
1880	2,141	−1.3%
1890	2,096	−2.1%
1900	2,150	+2.6%
1910	2,376	+10.5%

Year	Pop.	±%
1921	2,281	−4.0%
1930	2,436	+6.8%
1950	2,013	−17.4%
1961	2,004	−0.4%
1970	1,843	−8.0%

Year	Pop.	±%
1980	1,792	−2.8%
1991	1,535	−14.3%
2001	1,641	+6.9%
2011	1,764	+7.5%
2021	1,748	−0.9%

Source: Censuses

== Transport ==
The D1 motorway and its branch, the D48 motorway, run through the municipality.

Bělotín is located on the railway line Ostrava–Hranice.

== Sights ==
The main landmark of Bělotín is the Church of Saint George. It was built in the Baroque style in 1754, but it has a Renaissance tower. The second cultural monument in the municipality is the cemetery Church of Saint Urban in Nejdek, dating from 1752.

== Twin towns – sister cities ==
Bělotín is twinned with:

- Hinterschmiding, Germany
- Höchst im Odenwald, Germany
- Kolonowskie, Poland
