= Magda, Opole Voivodeship =

Magda
- Village
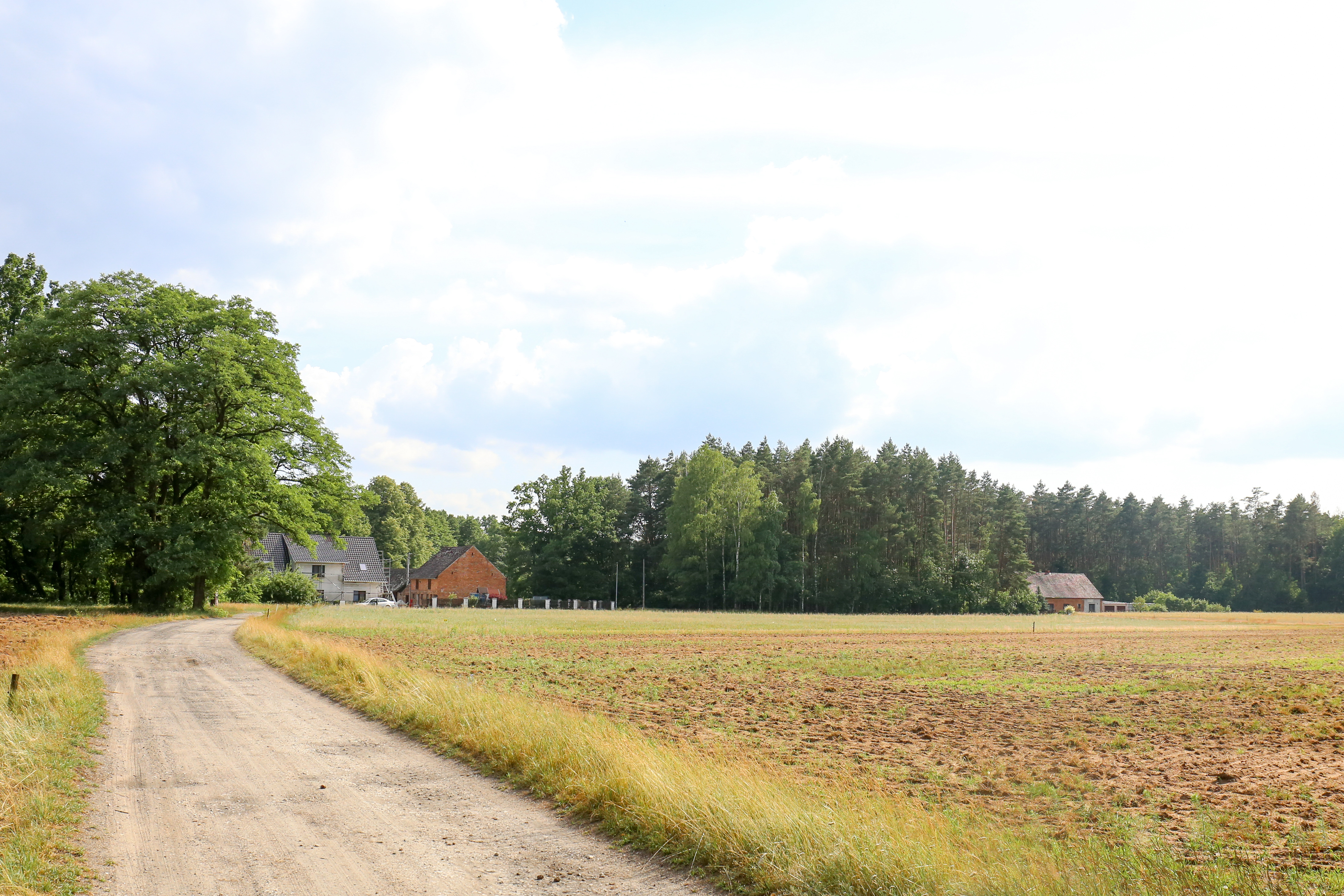

- Location within Poland
- Coordinates: 50°40′47″N 18°19′18″E
- Country: Poland
- Voivodeship: Opole
- County: Strzelce
- Gmina: Strzelce Opolskie

Population
  - Total: 0
- Time zone: UTC+1 (CET)
  - Summer (DST): UTC+2
- Area code: +4877
- Vehicle registration: OST

Magda is a village in the administrative district of Gmina Kolonowskie, within Strzelce County, Opole Voivodeship, in south-western Poland.
