= Ligota Turawska =

Ligota Turawska Ellguth Turawa
- Village
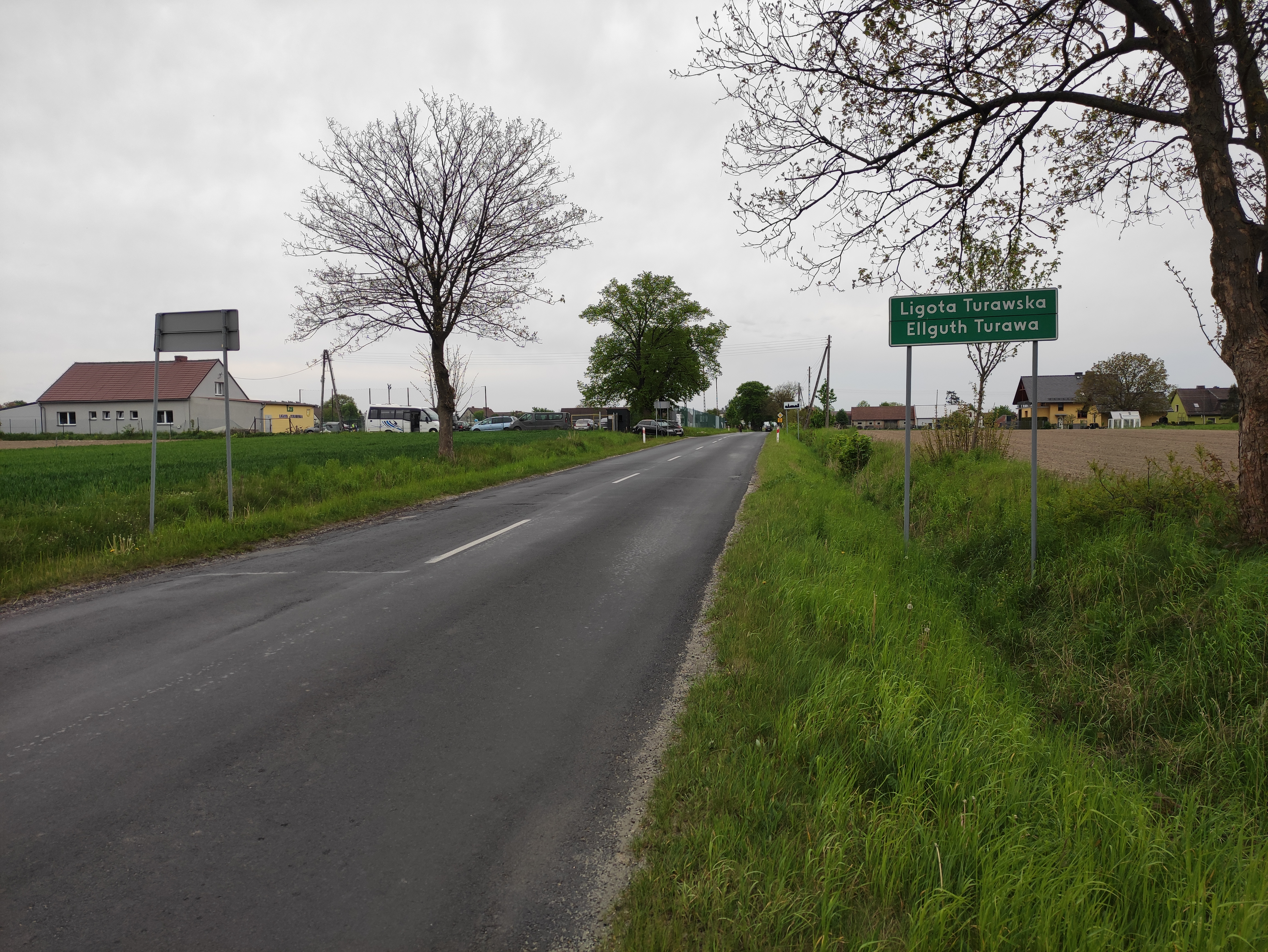

- Location within Poland
- Coordinates: 50°48′N 18°11′E
- Country: Poland
- Voivodeship: Opole
- County: Opole
- Gmina: Turawa

Population (approx.)
  - Total: 750
- Time zone: UTC+1 (CET)
  - Summer (DST): UTC+2 (CEST)
- Vehicle registration: OPO

Ligota Turawska ([liˈɡɔta tuˈrafska], additional name in German: Ellguth Turawa) is a village in the administrative district of Gmina Turawa, within Opole County, Opole Voivodeship, in southern Poland.

== History ==
The village was first mentioned in 1463, when Lord Adam Bies sold the villages of Groß Kottorz, Klein Kottorz, Kadlub, and Ellguth to Anna Schillhagen von Ottmuth for 422 marks. Both its Polish and German names derive from the medieval Slavic word lhóta, which referred to the 5-8 year grace period after a village was founded when it did not have to pay taxes. Though Ellguth Turawa became an independent entity in 1813, it remained part of the parish of Groß Kottorz until 1891.

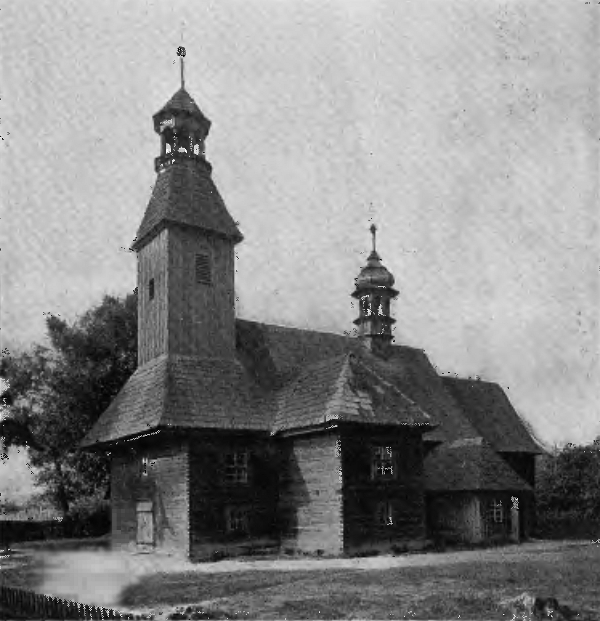
St. Catherine church in 1929

The village formerly had two churches. The most famous was the old Schrotholzkirche (wooden church) of St. Catherine that had been consecrated on November 21, 1629, by Johannes Balthasar, the Suffragan of Breslau. However, the church was destroyed in an act of arson by the Red Army in 1945. The second, present church was consecrated July 19, 1936. A Catholic school has existed in the village since the late 17th century.

In the Upper Silesia plebiscite of 20 March 1921, 316 villagers voted to remain with Germany and 307 voted for unification with the newly reestablished state of Poland. As a result, the village stayed part of the Weimar Republic. In 1933 the village had 1,014 inhabitants, and by 1939 it had grown to 1055. It received a boost to development with the construction of the Turawa Reservoir between 1933 and 1938. Until 1945 it was located in Landkreis Oppeln.

After 1945, the village was renamed Ligota Turawska after the Potsdam Conference put it inside Poland's new borders. It was originally placed the Silesian Voivodeship, but in 1950 it was moved to Opole Voivodeship.

The village hosts a branch of the SKGD (Sozial-Kulturelle Gesellschaft der Deutschen im Oppelner Schlesien, Social-Cultural Association of Germans in Opole Silesia).
