= Osowiec Śląski =

Osowiec Śląski Königshuld
- Village
- Location within Poland
- Coordinates: 50°45′N 18°2′E
- Country: Poland
- Voivodeship: Opole
- County: Opole
- Gmina: Turawa

Population
  - Total: 1,400
- Time zone: UTC+1 (CET)
  - Summer (DST): UTC+2 (CEST)
- Vehicle registration: OPO

Osowiec Śląski (Polish pronunciation: [ɔˈsɔvjɛt͡s ˈɕlɔ̃skʲi], additional name in German: Königshuld) is a village in the administrative district of Gmina Turawa, within Opole County, Opole Voivodeship, in south-western Poland.

== History ==
Four Polish citizens were murdered by Nazi Germany in the village during World War II.
