= Gmina Kolonowskie =

Gmina Kolonowskie Gemeinde Colonnowska Kolonowskie Commune
- Gmina
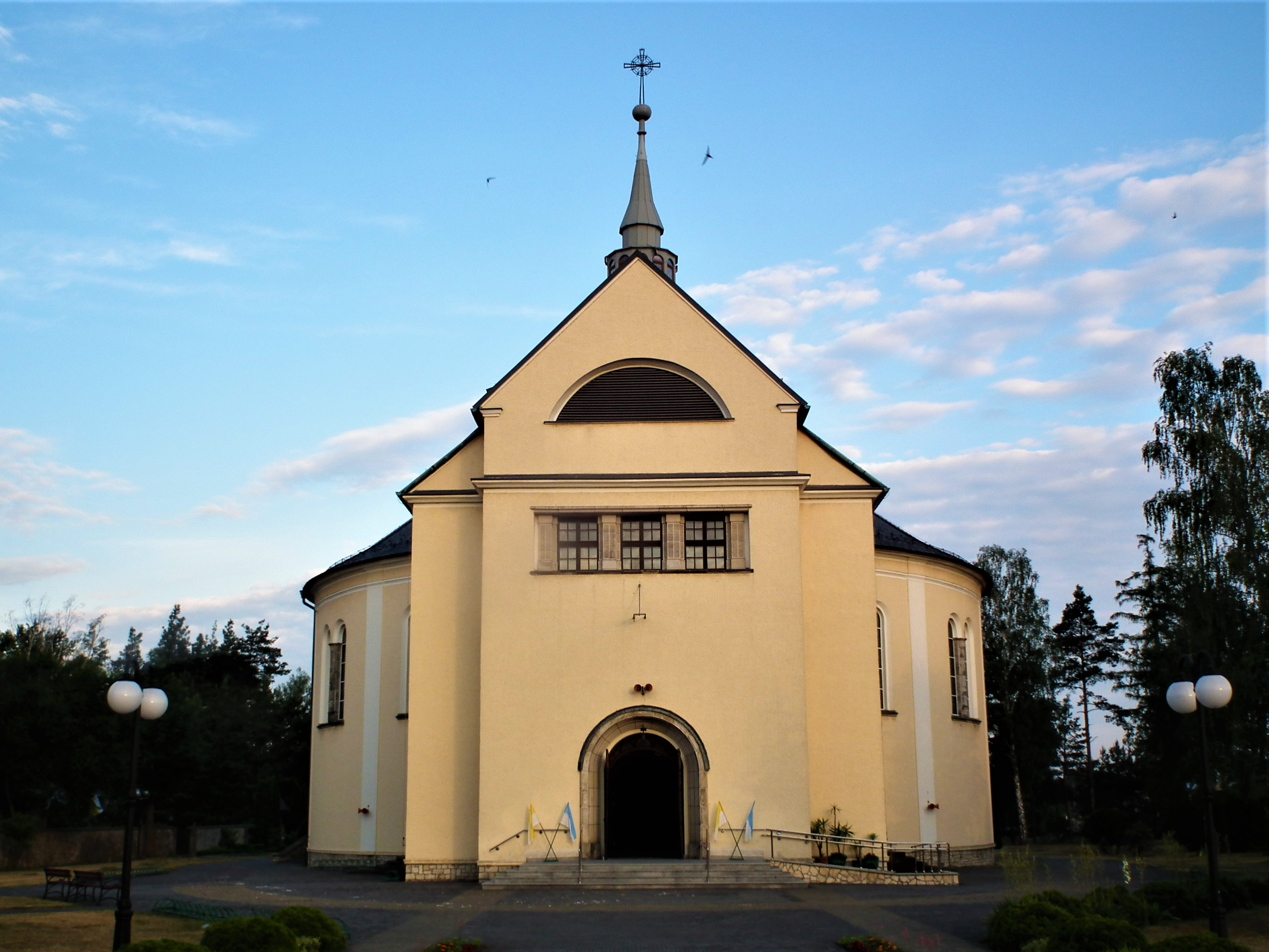
- Church of the Immaculate Heart of Mary in Kolonowskie

- Coat of arms
- Interactive map of Gmina Kolonowskie
- Coordinates (Kolonowskie): 50°39′11″N 18°23′20″E
- Country: Poland
- Voivodeship: Opole
- County: Strzelce
- Seat: Kolonowskie

Area
  - Total: 83.61 km^{2} (32.28 sq mi)

Population (2019-06-30)
  - Total: 5,895
  - Density: 70.51/km^{2} (182.6/sq mi)
  - Urban: 3,309
  - Rural: 2,856
- Time zone: UTC+1 (CET)
  - Summer (DST): UTC+2 (CEST)
- Vehicle registration: OST
- Website: http://www.kolonowskie.pl

Gmina Kolonowskie (German: Gemeinde Colonnowska) is an urban-rural gmina (municipality) in Strzelce County, Opole Voivodeship, in Upper Silesia in southern Poland. Its seat is the town of Kolonowskie, which lies approximately 19 kilometres (12 mi) north-east of Strzelce Opolskie and 33 km (21 mi) east of the regional capital Opole.

The gmina covers an area of 83.61 square kilometres (32.3 sq mi), and as of 2019 its total population is 5,895. Since 2006, the gmina has been officially bilingual in Polish and German.

== Villages ==
The commune contains the villages of Magda, Kolonowskie, Spórok, Staniszcze Małe and Staniszcze Wielkie.

== Neighbouring districts ==
Gmina Kolonowskie is bordered by the gminas of Dobrodzień, Jemielnica, Ozimek, Strzelce Opolskie and Zawadzkie.

== Twin towns – sister cities ==
Gmina Kolonowskie is twinned with:

- Beilrode, Germany
- Bělotín, Czech Republic
- Chmelnica, Slovakia
- Gehrden, Germany
- Wolfsgraben, Austria
