= Szczedrzyk =

- Village
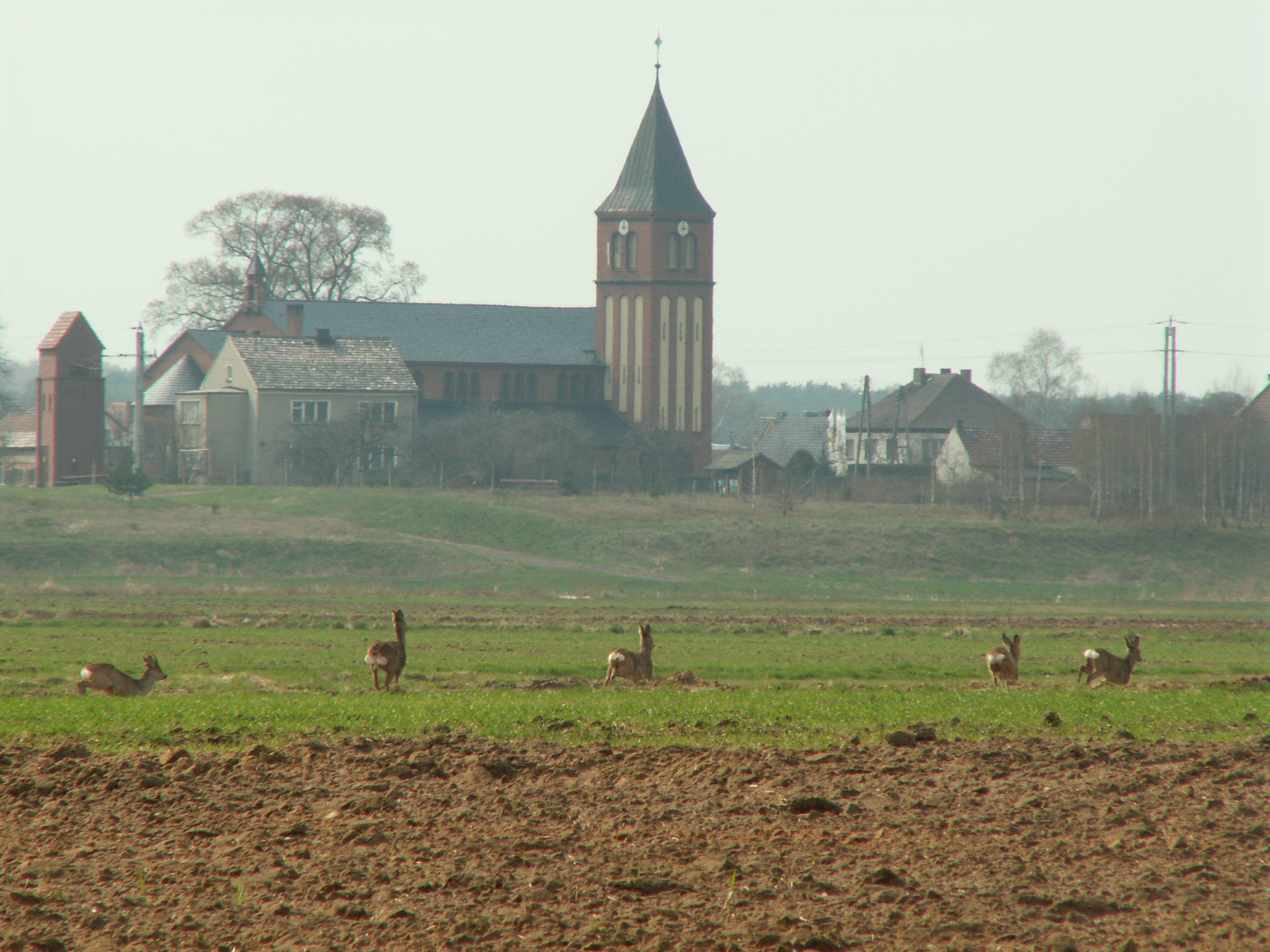
- Local Catholic church

- Location within Poland
- Coordinates: 50°42′N 18°9′E
- Country: Poland
- Voivodeship: Opole
- County: Opole
- Gmina: Ozimek

Szczedrzyk [ˈʂt͡ʂɛdʐɨk] (German: Sczedrzik) is a village in the administrative district of Gmina Ozimek, within Opole County, Opole Voivodeship, in south-western Poland.
