= Marszałki, Opole Voivodeship =

Marszałki
- Village
- Location within Poland
- Coordinates: 50°45′17″N 18°5′13″E
- Country: Poland
- Voivodeship: Opole
- County: Opole
- Gmina: Turawa

Marszałki [marˈʂau̯ki] (German: Marscholken) is a village in the administrative district of Gmina Turawa, within Opole County, Opole Voivodeship, in south-western Poland.
