= Kotórz Wielki =

Kotórz Wielki Groß Kottorz
- Village
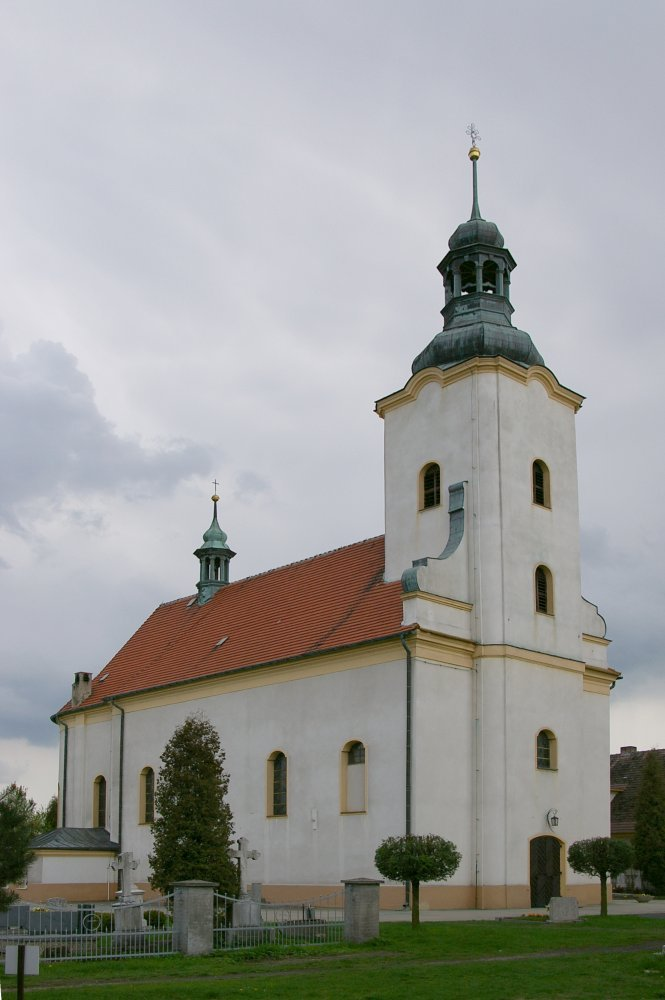
- Saint Michael church in Kotórz Wielki

- Location within Poland
- Coordinates: 50°44′N 18°4′E
- Country: Poland
- Voivodeship: Opole
- County: Opole
- Gmina: Turawa

Population (approx.)
  - Total: 350
- Time zone: UTC+1 (CET)
  - Summer (DST): UTC+2 (CEST)
- Vehicle registration: OPO

Kotórz Wielki (Polish pronunciation: [ˈkɔtuʂ ˈvjɛlkʲi], additional name in German: Groß Kottorz) is a village in the administrative district of Gmina Turawa, within Opole County, Opole Voivodeship, in southern Poland.

== History ==
The village was first documented in 1295 in the Liber fundationis episcopatus Vratislaviensis as "Chotors", when it was part of fragmented Piast-ruled Poland.

The first wooden church for the village existed before 1293. At the initiative of Anna Barbara von Gaschin, construction began in 1782 for a new church for the village. Permission was given by the Bishop of Wrocław on January 31, construction began in February, and by October the building was already covered with a roof. On a ball on the decorative spire of the church is written "Franz Herzog von Gaschin, highly born, married to Anna Barbara von Garnier, decided for the greater honor of God to give money to build a new church." The document ends "This document has been placed on this ball by me, Pastor Carl Padiery, for the good of future generations. The parish celebrated its 100th anniversary in 1882 though a small exhibition of documents detailing its history collected by its then-priest, Father Kahl, who was an avid scholar.

In 1840 the village had 385 inhabitants, and a large new school was built.

In the Upper Silesia plebiscite of 20 March 1921 164 villagers voted to remain with Germany and 164 voted to join the newly reestablished state of Poland. However, because citizens of Gemeinde Turawa overall voted for Germany, the village remained part of the Weimar Republic. In 1933 the village had 547 inhabitants. On 19 May 1936 the village was renamed Groß Kochen by Nazi officials because of its Polish-sounding name. By 1939 the village had shrunk to only 474 inhabitants. Before 1945 it belonged to the district of Landkreis Oppeln.

The village is situated near the Turawa Reservoir, which was begun in 1933 with construction of the dam and then completed in 1938. During its contraction, 3 million cubic tons of earth were moved, 225 thousand tons of stone, 10 thousand tons of cement and the same amount of reinforced steel. The construction of the dam destroyed several villages, and villagers from three (Zamoscie, Krzysline, and Vorwerk Kuchara) were resettled in Groß Kottorz. However, it also brought development to the area.

After Germany's defeat in World War II in 1945, the village was part of the region that became again part of Poland under the terms of the Potsdam Agreement. It was renamed Kotórz Wielki. Though it was originally placed in Silesian Voivodeship, in 1950 it was moved to Opole Voivodeship.

The town has a volunteer fire brigade, founded in 1934. It organizes may dances for the residents through the "Firemen's Club". It also organizes a traditional Silesian carnival known as "leading the bear" ("Wodzenie niedźwiedzia" in Polish, "Bährenführen" in German), through which it gets donations for maintenance. The building it is housed in is also home to the offices of the German Minority/German Cultural Association, which also holds events there.
