= Mała Panew =

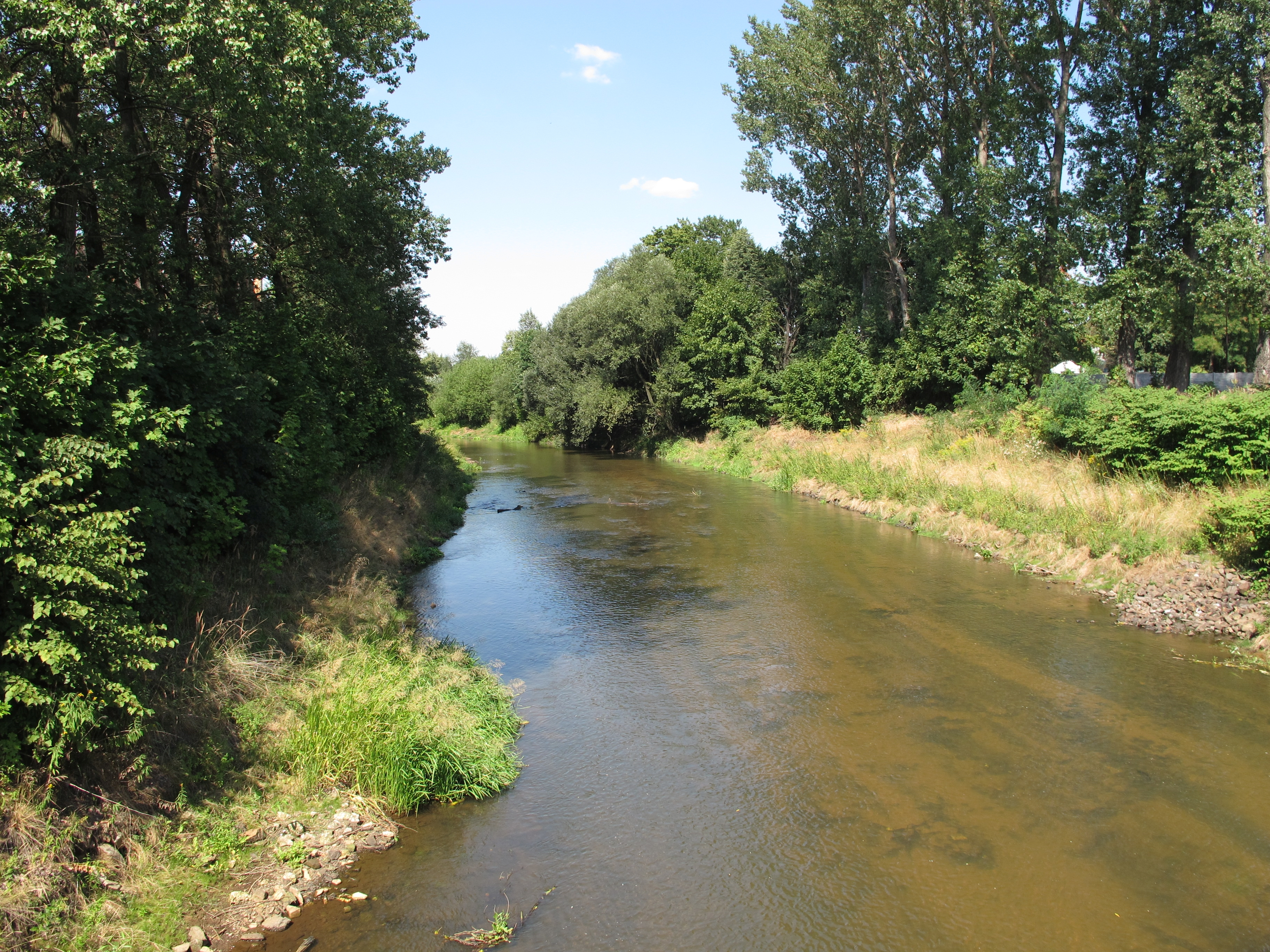
- The Mała Panew near Ozimek

Location
- Country: Poland

Physical characteristics
- Source
  - location: near Koziegłowy, Silesian Voivodeship (between Markowice, Rzeniszów and Krusin)
- Mouth
  - location: Oder at Czarnowąsy (Opole)
  - coordinates: 50°43′07″N 17°52′43″E
- Length: 132 km (82 mi)
- Basin size: 2,132 km^{2} (823 sq mi)

Basin features
- Progression: Oder → Baltic Sea

The Mała Panew (German: Malapane) is a river in south-western Poland, flowing through the Silesian and Opole Voivodeships. A right-bank tributary of the Oder, it joins the river at Czarnowąsy (now part of Opole). The river is about 132 km (82 mi) long and drains a basin of about 2,132 km^{2} (823 sq mi). Its sources lie near Koziegłowy (between the villages of Markowice, Rzeniszów and Krusin), and the Turawa Reservoir is impounded on its lower course.
