= I Silesian Uprising =

- Part of Silesian Uprisings
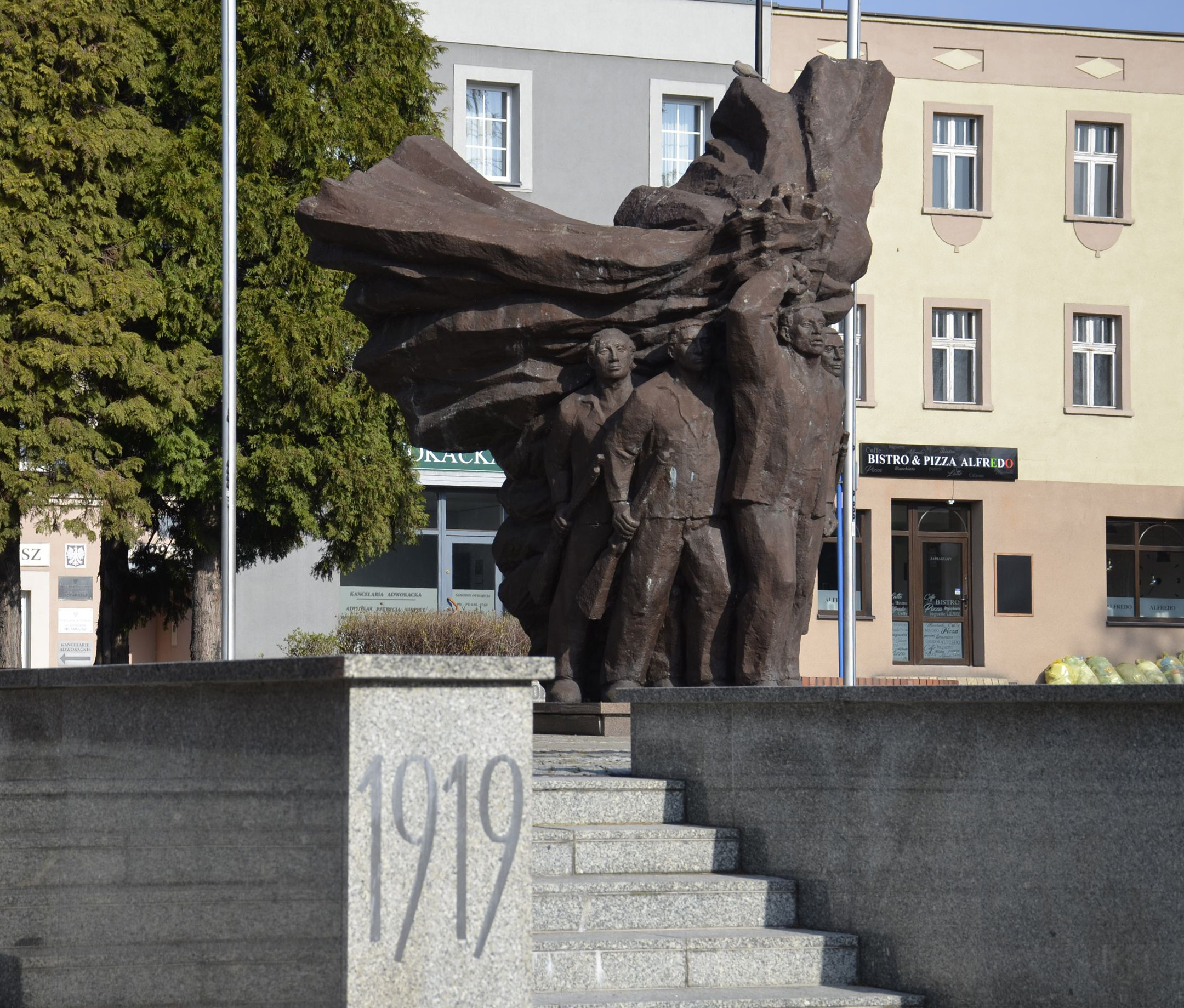
- Monument to Silesian rebels in Wodzisław Śląski
Date	16–24 August 1919
Location	Upper Silesia
Result	The rebels' loss

Belligerents
Polish Military Organization of Upper Silesia	Weimar Republic

Commanders and leaders
Alfons Zgrzebniok	Karl Höfer

Casualties and losses
23 people	35 people

I Silesian Uprising was an armed uprising organized by the Polish military Organisation in Upper Silesia with the aim of annexing this region to Poland. The uprising began on the orders of Maximilian Ixal or someone from the command of prisoners of war in Upper Silesia on the night of 16–17 August 1919. It took place against the will of the Polish government and Wojciech Korfanty in the northern part of the country and lasted until 24 August of the same year.

== Background ==
=== Political situation ===
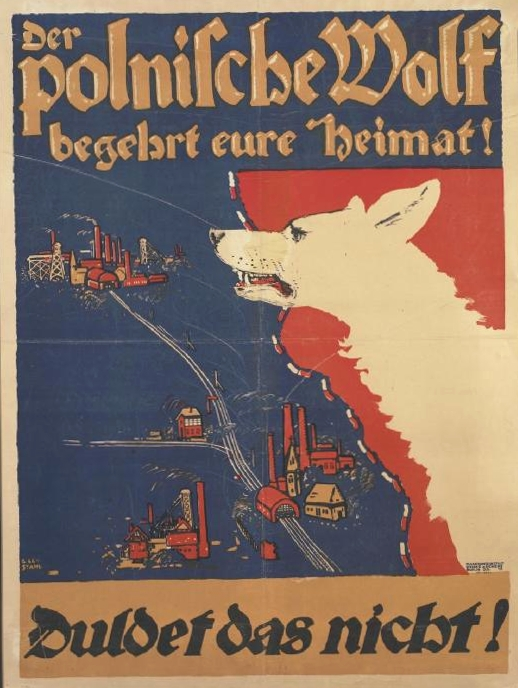
German propaganda poster from the period of the uprising « the Polish wolf desires your homeland »

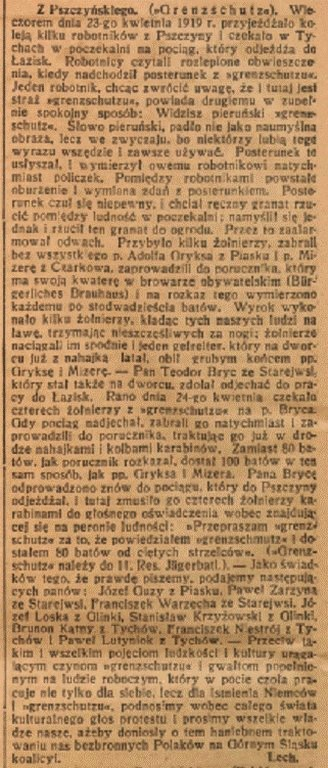
Stanislav Krzyzhowski's text on the persecution of Poles was published on the pages of Verkhnesilezak on 27 April 1919.

After the defeat of Germany in World War I and the flight of Kaiser Wilhelm II to the Netherlands in November 1918, the situation in Upper Silesia became extremely tense. This process was influenced not only by military failures but also by the growing radicalisation of social and national sentiments among Poles living in the region. At thousands of rallies, including those held at the Polish house « Beehive » in Bytom on 10 November 1918, resolutions were adopted aimed at creating an independent Poland, which was to include Polish Silesia. The participants also spoke in favor of restoring social relations, nationalisation, an eight-hour working day, fair pensions and earnings, as well as an insurance system. With the partial collapse of the German administration and after the Berlin Revolution, the Polish population of Silesia quickly began to organize people's councils. One of the first was the People's Council in Bytom, established on 12 November 1918. These councils represented the interests of the Polish population before the German administration or acted as the sole administrative and legal authority where there was no German administration. As a result of the formation of the People's Councils, the Supreme People's Council was formed in Bytom. Simultaneously with the People's Councils, other Polish organisations appeared, such as the Polish Professional Association, with about 200,000 members, the Central Trade Union of Poland with more than 60,000 members, the National Workers' Party with about 50,000 members, as well as the PSP and the Christian People's Association. The German authorities tried to contain the spontaneous organisational development of Poles in Silesia by appointing Otton Hersig, known as the « executioner of Poles », as government commissioner. An order was also issued by the President of the Opole district, Joseph Beatty, in which pro-Polish activities were recognised as high treason. At the request of Commissioner Otton Hersig, the government in Berlin reinforced the military corps stationed in Upper Silesia, sending there the 117th Infantry Division under the command of Major General Karl Höfer (later known as Nazi and SS Oberführer).

=== Circumstances under which the decision on the explosion and the Silesian Uprising was made ===
On 11 August 1919, a meeting of the district commanders of the Upper Silesian provinces was held in Bytom under the leadership of Jozef Grzegorzek. At this meeting, it was decided to send a demand to the command in the Stream in Tesin Silesia to start an uprising. For this purpose, Stanislav Mastalers and Jan Lorz were sent to the Stream, who, however, did not find Commander Alfonso Skrebnek in place. In this regard, Jan Vyglenda, deputy commander and head of the intelligence department, summoned all the commanders of the military enlistment offices of Upper Silesia on 15 August, and then on 18 August.

Meanwhile, on 15 August 1919, the Germans unexpectedly arrested three leaders of the Upper Silesian Communists on the highway from Pavlovica to the Stream:

- Wilhelm Foyczyk from Katowice, who led the preparation of railway workers for the uprising;
- Friedrich Reisch from Katowice, Deputy Commandant of Katowice Country;
- Karol Goretsky from Markovich, commandant of Ratsibor district;
- Jan Januszczyk from Szczopice, accompanying them.

On the morning of 16 August, three main couriers of the Upper Silesian Military Command were arrested: František Gajdzik, Ludvik Mikolajec and Szczepanik. They carried orders for the district commanders. Even before the start of the Silesian Uprising, mutual shelling of positions took place between the future rebels who were in the refugee camp in Petrovica (the legal commandant of which was Jozef Michalski) and Grenzschutz, stationed in Golkowice on the Vodzislaw Land. In this situation, a group of Silesian refugees in Petrovica, led by Maximilian Iksal, ordered the commanders of Upper Silesian prisoners of war in Rybnik and Pszczyna to start an uprising, setting the date of the explosion for 17 August 1919 at 2 a.m. This order certainly reached the county commandant of Upper Silesia in Rybnik, Ludwik Pehocek, who did not comply with it, since Maximilian Ixal was not authorised to issue it. However, it is not known whose order was delivered to Pskov at about 12 o'clock on 16 August 1919. According to some reports, he was sent by a man from the command of the military enlistment office of Upper Silesia in the Stream. (The decision not to start an armed struggle was made by the headquarters in the Stream later, only in the afternoon of 16 August, shortly before the arrest by secret German military police of Jozef Grzegorzek and Chief of Staff Jozef Bula, who were on a business trip from the Stream. The latter had with him the orders given that day in the Stream forbidding the beginning of an armed uprising, and was arrested at the railway station in Pavlovitsy at about 20 hours).

== Armed actions ==
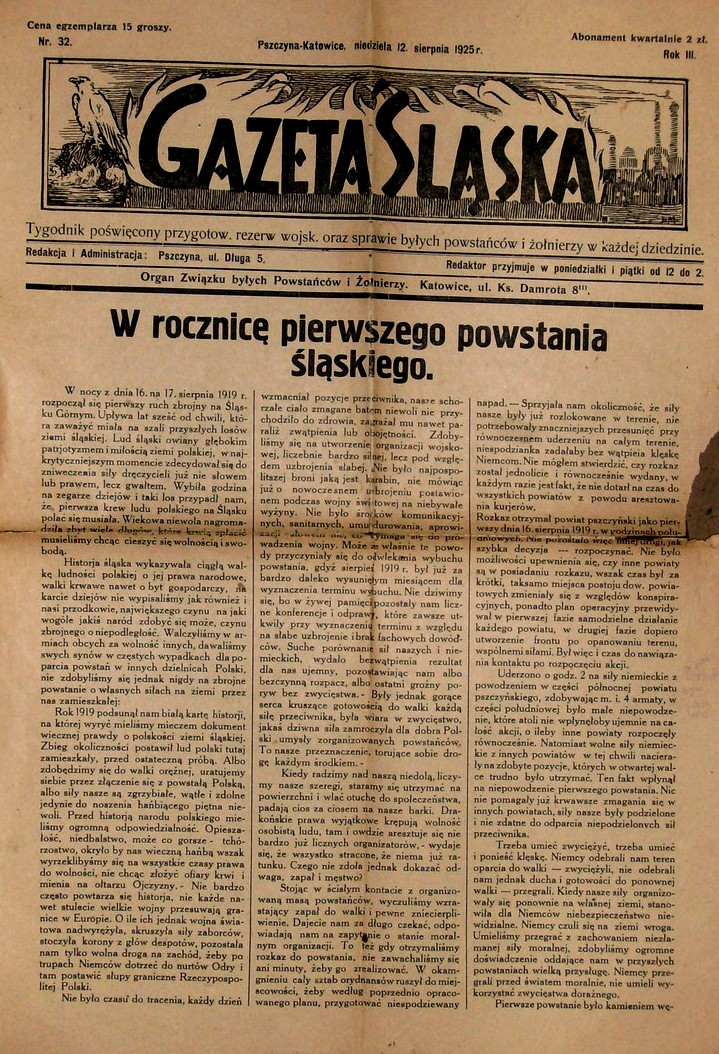
Stanislav Krzyzhowski's memoir About the Silesian Uprising, part I

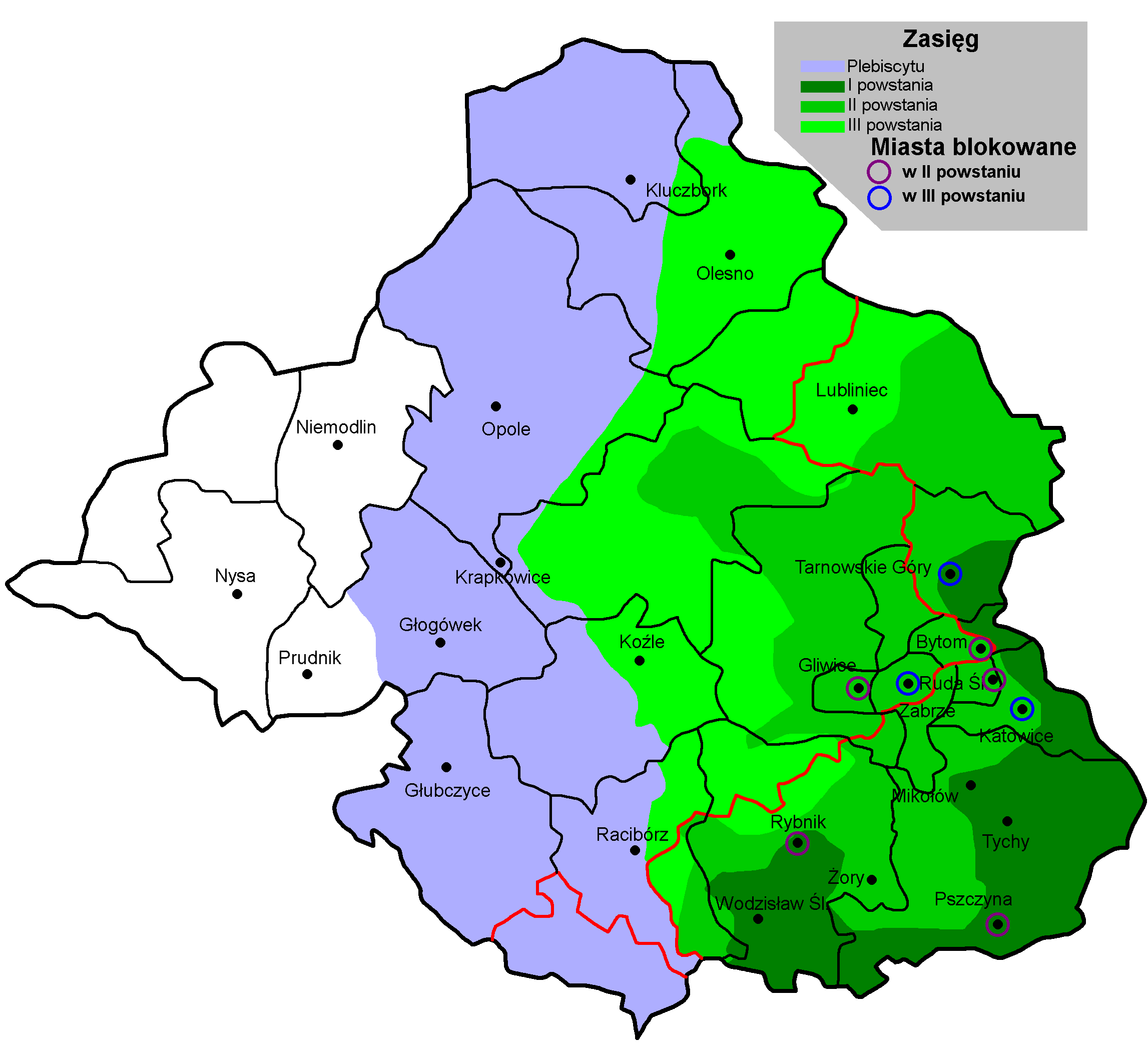
Scale of the Silesian uprisings

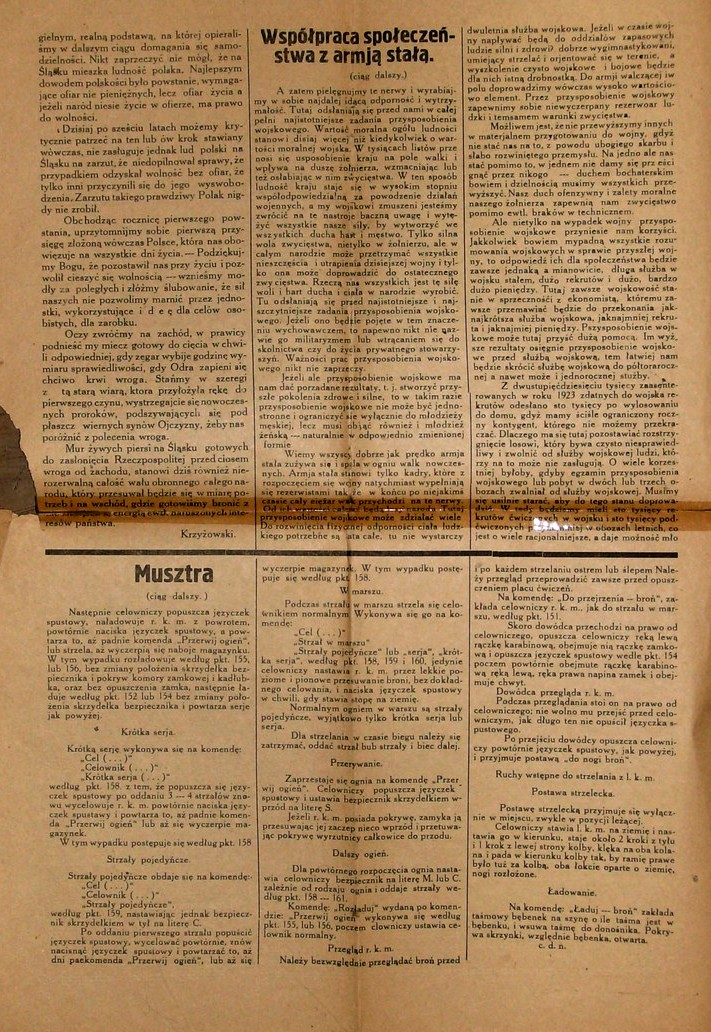
Stanislav Krzyzhowski's memoir About the Silesian Uprising, part II

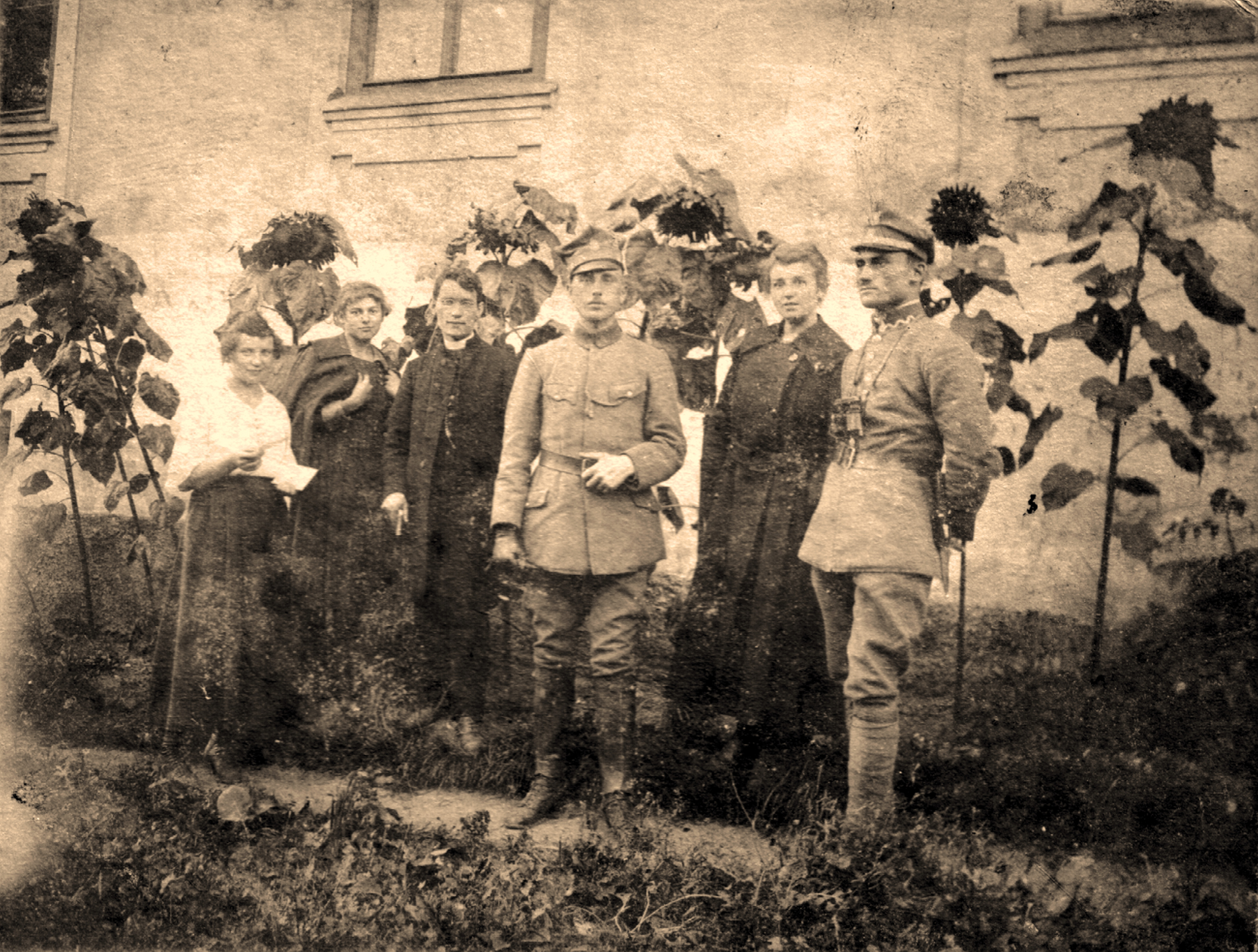
Stanislav Krzyżowski (first from right) in September 1919 in Dziedzice, after the outbreak of the Silesian Uprising (in the northern part of the Pszczyn county)

=== Fighting in the vicinity of Pszczyna, Tychow, Rybnik and Wodzislaw Sileski ===
The commandant of the Pskov region, Alois Fizia, began military operations on the orders of Maximilian Ixal or a person from the military command of Upper Silesia. He believed that the verbal order, written down on a small piece of paper and delivered to him by courier on about 16 August 1919, was issued by the command of prisoners of war in the Stream. Polish sources suggest that the command of the prisoners of war in the Stream could have silently accepted the actions of the Iksala group, since it did not offer effective resistance. In 1920, Iksal was promoted to the post of deputy commandant of prisoners of war in the Opole municipality. Only Jozef Grzegorzek from the Executive Committee of the Volga region sent Iksal a telegram forbidding a separate action. However, the group led by Iksal also launched armed actions in Golkovica, in the southern part of the Vodzislaw Land, three hours after the start of hostilities in the Pszczyn county.

In the northern part of the Pschinsky district, the deputy district commandant Stanislav Krzyzhovsky acted, on whose orders the first military operations began on the Pschinsky Land. On the night of 17 August 1919, at 1:00 a.m., he went to Tykhy to seize the railway station, the farmyard and the post office. On the same night, the Grenzschutz detachment from the village of Chuvov attacked the rebels. After the initial retreat, the rebels launched a successful counterattack and repelled the next German attack, which was directed at Zhvakov. In the village of Urbanovice, even earlier, on 16 August 1919, at 23:00, the second rebel company under the command of Viktor Shchegla, which was subordinate to Krzyzhowski, joined the battle. The company, numbering 75 people, disarmed the Grenzschutz detachment and moved to the village of Paprokany, where there was a large detachment of the German army armed with artillery. During the battle for Paprocany, which lasted until 4:00 a.m., three well-armed detachments from the first company of the rebels, who had previously captured Tykhy, came to the rescue. The Silesians managed to capture the village and odvah, where the Germans were defending themselves. During the battle, one rebel was killed, four field guns, several machine guns, more than 100 hand rifles, 50 artillery horses and 100 prisoners were captured along with the commander.

In Mikołów, 180 rebels under the command of Richard Beck were unable to capture the city after two hours of fighting. Similarly, Alois Fisi, who commanded in the southern part of the district, failed to take Pszczyna. However, he managed to capture the old town of Bieruń.

The Silesian rebels led by Stefan Krzyzhowski, who temporarily replaced his brother Stanislav, who went to Pskov to contact Aloysius Fizia, began to retreat from the Tykhov area, fearing encirclement. During the retreat, they encountered German planes, one of which they managed to shoot down. An armored train was also expected to arrive from Gliwice.

The Pszczyńska POW of Upper Silesia, which consisted of 2,173 members, managed to capture almost the entire district, with the exception of Pszczyna and Mikołów.
