= Battle of Paprotzan =

- Part of First Silesian Uprising
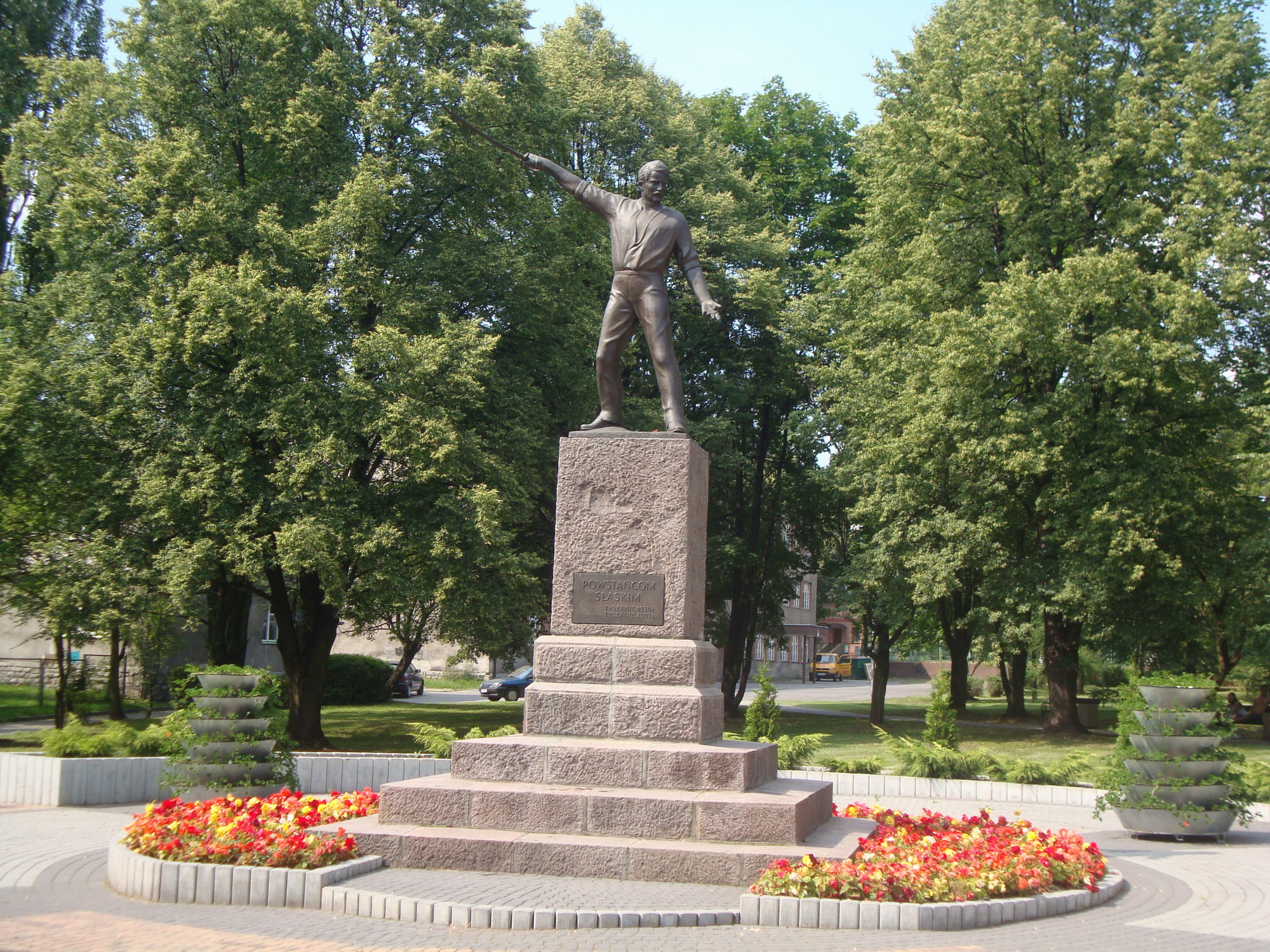
- The Silesian insurgent monument in Tychy
Date	17 August 1919
Location	Paprotzan (Near Tichau), Germany
Result	Polish victory

Belligerents
POW G.Śl.	Weimar Republic

Commanders and leaders
Wiktor Szczygieł; Jan Wróbel	Capt. Goess

Units involved
(2nd) Urbanowitz Insurgent Company; (1st) Tichau Insurgent Company	Grenzschutz Ost: Battery of field artillery of the 32nd Light Artillery Regiment

Strength
At least 75 insurgents	Around 100 soldiers; Including several HMGs and artillery guns

Casualties and losses
15 killed	46 captured

The Battle of Paprotzan (Polish: Bitwa o Paprocany) was a battle during the First Silesian Uprising that occurred on 17 August 1919 in the village of Paprotzan on the outskirts of Tichau, and resulted in a Polish victory.

The Battle of Paprotzan is considered the most significant insurgent victory of the First Silesian Uprising in the Pleß district.

== Prelude ==
With Maksymilian Iksal having declared the commencement of the uprising in Upper Silesia, Alojzy Fizia the commander of POW G.Śl. forces in Pleß district attempted to contact the commanders of the Kattowitz and Rybnik districts. Having not received an answer, Fizia decided to follow through with orders received from Piotrowice to commence the uprising.

=== Polish preparation ===
Alojzy Fizia's operational plan foresaw the 2nd Urbanowitz insurgent company capturing Urbanowitz before marching on Paprotzan where it was intended to confront and defeat the German field artillery battery guarding the village.
Meanwhile, the 1st Tichau insurgent company was intended to capture Tichau before assisting insurgents fighting in the village of Paprotzan.

=== German preparation ===
A battery of field artillery, commanded by Captain Goess, of the 32nd Light Artillery Regiment stationed in Paprotzan, numbering some 100-men. Stationing German forces in Paprotzan were directly subordinate to a division commanded by Major Aldenhoven. German soldiers in the village were quartered in the houses of local farmers: on the lands of Teofil Czypek, Walentyn Czardybon, the Jarek family, Karol Goja, Wildner and Jan Bortl as well as in the school building and a pub owned by Salomon Richter (3-8 men in every building). The captain and commander of the artillery battery was stationed in Wildner's house and the German lieutenant quartered in Czardybon's house.

Shortly before the insurgents' attack on Paprotzan, a part of the artillery battery left the village headed for Czulow where fighting had broken out.

=== Outbreak of the uprising ===
Without waiting for a signal to commence combat action, Wiktor Szczygieł, heading the 75-man strong 2nd insurgent company moved in to the manor in Urbanowitz on 16 August at At 11:00 p.m. where he disarmed and took captive 12 Grenzschutz soldiers placing the village under insurgent control. As planned, Szczygieł's 2nd company was headed for Paprotzan next where it intended on defeating the German battery of field artillery stationing in the village.

== Battle ==
On August 17 at around 1:00 a.m. the 2nd insurgent company from Urbanowitz, supported by insurgents from neighbouring villages, commenced their attack on Paprotzan.

The insurgent force, split into smaller combat groups, attacked multiple targets simultaneously. German soldiers put up significant resistance on the grounds of the Jarek family (where German field artillery was stationed) as well as on Walenty Czardybon's and on Teofil Czypek's land. Soon thereafter, Jan Duka, commanding a reserve company, and Ludwik Gongor and Józef Kurzak, commanding the 1st Tichau insurgent company, arrived in Paprotzan to assist the insurgents engaged in combat.

Aforementioned insurgent reinforcements marched on Walenty Czardybon's house. Grenzschutz Ost soldiers guarding the building responded with rifle fire, which proved ineffective due to thick fog and insurgent forces captured the building after cornering the guarding soldiers.

The Battle of Paprotzan was fierce but brief; after half an hour of fighting the Grenzschutz Ost unit in Paprotzan was disarmed. The German forces in the village, confident in their own strength, were taken by surprise by the insurgent attack.

== Aftermath ==
In total, 15 insurgents fell in the battle for Paprotzan. However, the battle was a resounding success for insurgent forces, with 4 artillery guns, 2 heavy machine guns, 100 rifles, 50 horses and several wagons with ammunition falling into insurgent hands. Furthermore, it is estimated that 46 German soldiers were taken as prisoners of war following the engagement, including Captain Goess.

A plaque, located on the front wall of the kindergarten in Paprocany, commemorates the battle.
