= Edward Creasy =

Edward Creasy may refer to:

- Edward Shepherd Creasy, English historian and jurist
- Edward Crozier Creasy, British Army officer
