= Paprocany =

Settlement in Tychy, Poland

Coordinates: 50.096188°N 18.994023°E

- dzielnica
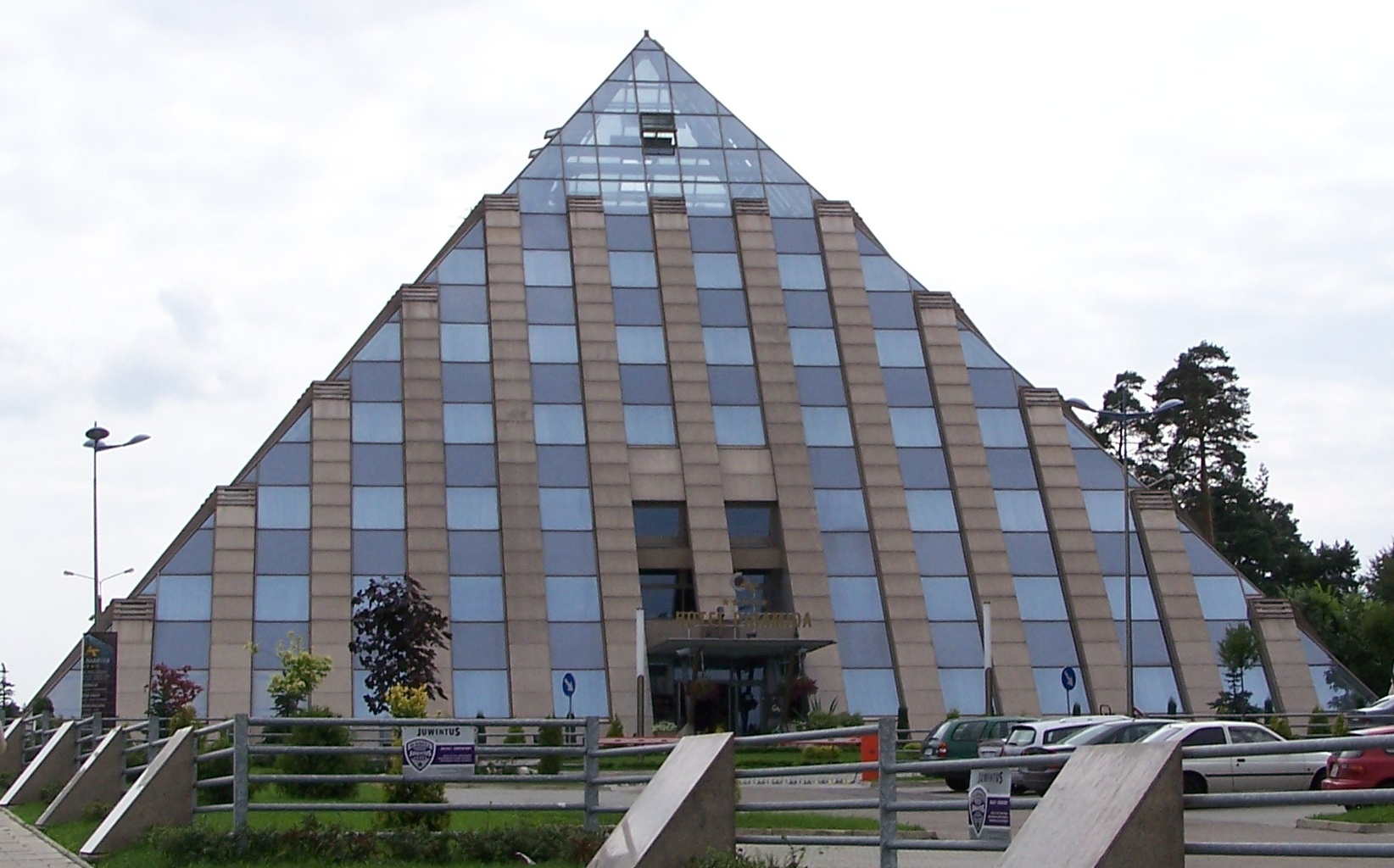
- The Pyramida hotel
- Interactive map of Paprocany
- Country: Poland
- Voivodeship: Silesian
- City-county: Tychy

Paprocany (German: Paprotzan) is a dzielnica (district) of Tychy, Silesian Voivodeship, southern Poland. It was an independent village and a seat of gmina, which was absorbed by Tychy in 1951.

== History ==
The village was first mentioned in Liber beneficiorum of Jan Długosz, scribed in years 1470–1480, as belonging to Lędziny parish.

During the political upheaval caused by Matthias Corvinus the land around Pszczyna was overtaken by Casimir II, Duke of Cieszyn, who sold it in 1517 to the Hungarian magnates of the Thurzó family, forming the Pless state country. In the accompanying sales document issued on 21 February 1517 the village was mentioned as Paproczany.

In the War of the Austrian Succession most of Silesia was conquered by the Kingdom of Prussia, including the village. The village of Paprocany was the site of a battle during the First Silesian Uprising. During the Upper Silesia plebiscite 386 out of 426 voters in Paprocany voted in favour of joining Poland, against 40 opting for staying in Germany. The village became a part of autonomous Silesian Voivodeship in Second Polish Republic. It was then annexed by Nazi Germany at the beginning of World War II. After the war it was restored to Poland.

== People ==
- August Karl Eduard Kiss (1802–1865), German sculptor
- Paweł Kontny (1910–1945), Polish Roman Catholic priest, killed by Soviet soldiers
