= August Kiss =

German sculptor (1802–1865)

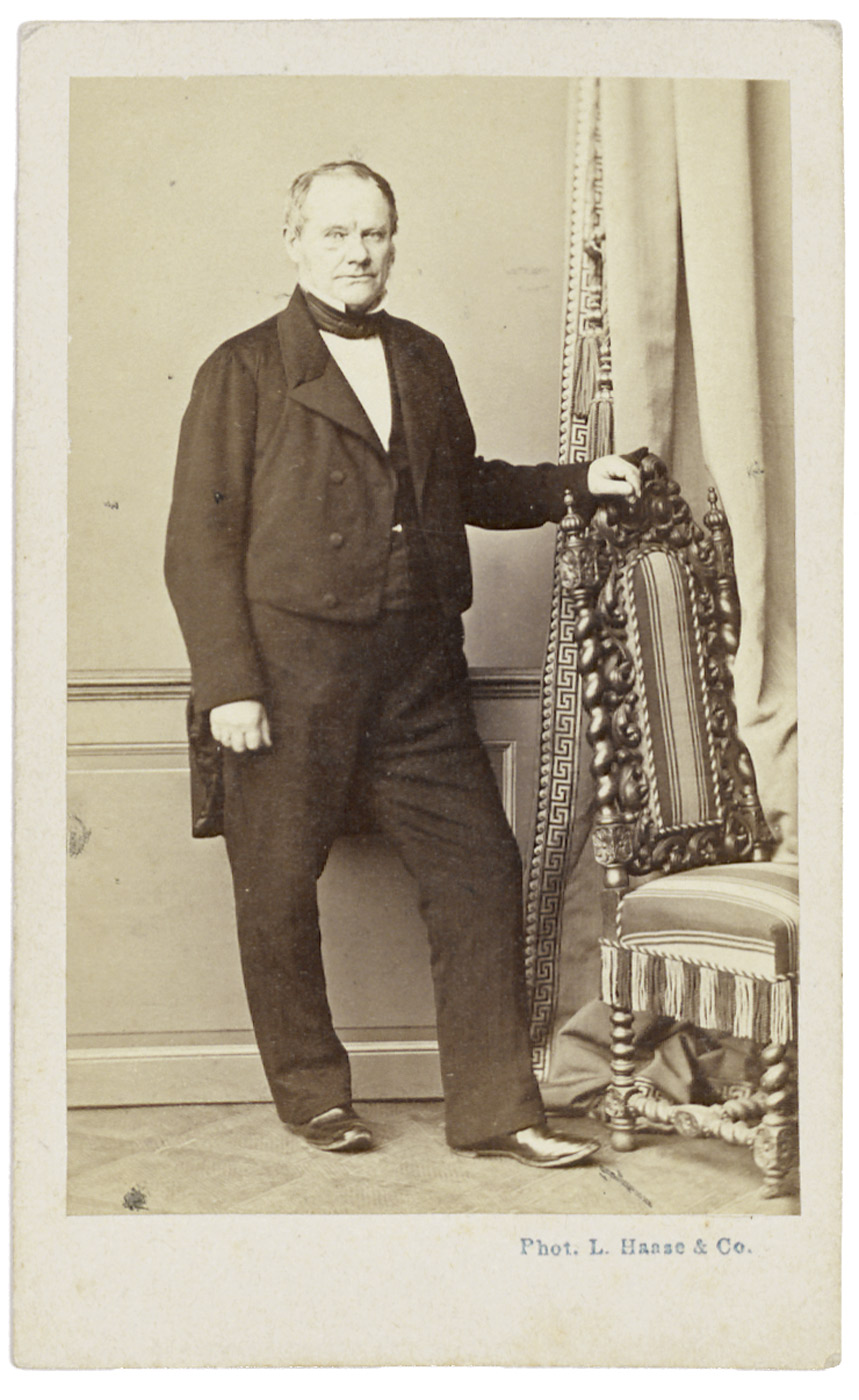
- August Kiss in the 1860s
- Born: 11 October 1802; Paprotzan, Province of Silesia
- Died: 24 March 1865 (aged 62); Berlin, Province of Brandenburg
- Known for: Sculpture

August Karl Eduard Kiss, or Kiß (October 11, 1802 – 24 March 1865), was a German sculptor, known for his monumental bronzes. His work was mostly executed in the Neoclassical architecture style and consisted largely of portraits and mythological and allegorical subjects.

== Life and works ==
Kiss was born in Paprotzan (now Paprocany, part of Tychy in Poland) in Prussian Silesia. He studied at the Prussian Academy of Arts under Christian Daniel Rauch, Christian Friedrich Tieck, and Karl Friedrich Schinkel. As a student, his most famous work was the relief on the gable field of the St. Nicholas Church in Potsdam.

Kiss became well known in Germany by 1839 when he made a sculpture depicting an Amazon fighting a panther in marble for Ludwig I of Bavaria. It was later cast into bronze as Amazone zu Pferde, and placed outside the Altes Museum.

Kiss was responsible for two monuments in Wrocław: On the west part of the Ring, stood a bronze equestrian statue of Frederick the Great (1847), and another equestrian statue of Prussian King Frederick Wilhelm III of Prussia (1862). His only other work in marble was the monument dedicated to Countess Laura Henckel von Donnersmarck, itself based on a previous work by mentor Christian Rauch dedicated to Queen Louise of Mecklenburg-Strelitz.

In 1863, he was admitted as an associate member of the Royal Academies for Science and the Arts of Belgium.

Kiss died unexpectedly on 24 March 1865, aged 62, in Berlin.

== Legacy ==
In 1889, the Fairmount Park Art Association (now the Association for Public Art) obtained a plaster of one of Amazone zu Pferde. In 1929, the work was cast in bronze and now stands in front of the Philadelphia Museum of Art.

An obelisk near Paprocany, his ancestral home, was commemorated in 2003.

== Selected sculptures ==
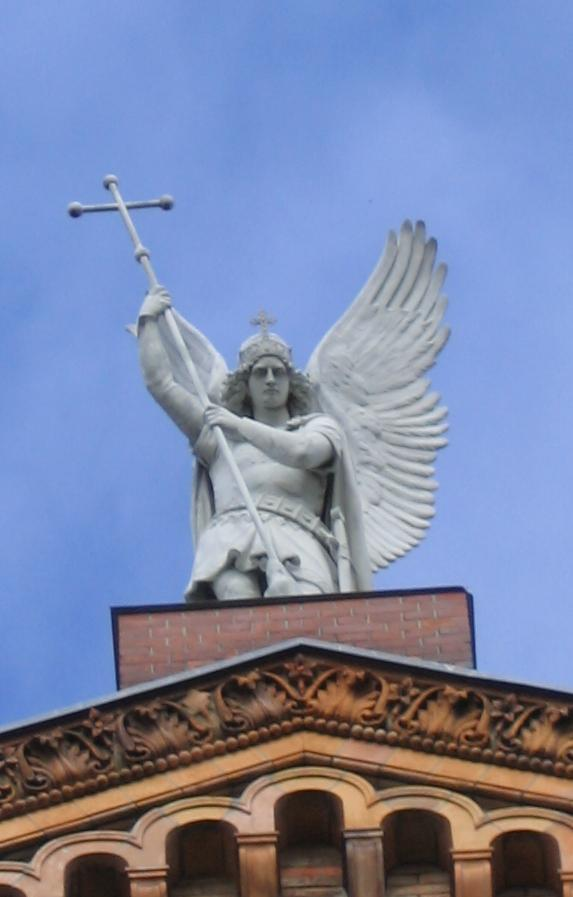
The angel Michael at Saint Michael's church, Berlin.

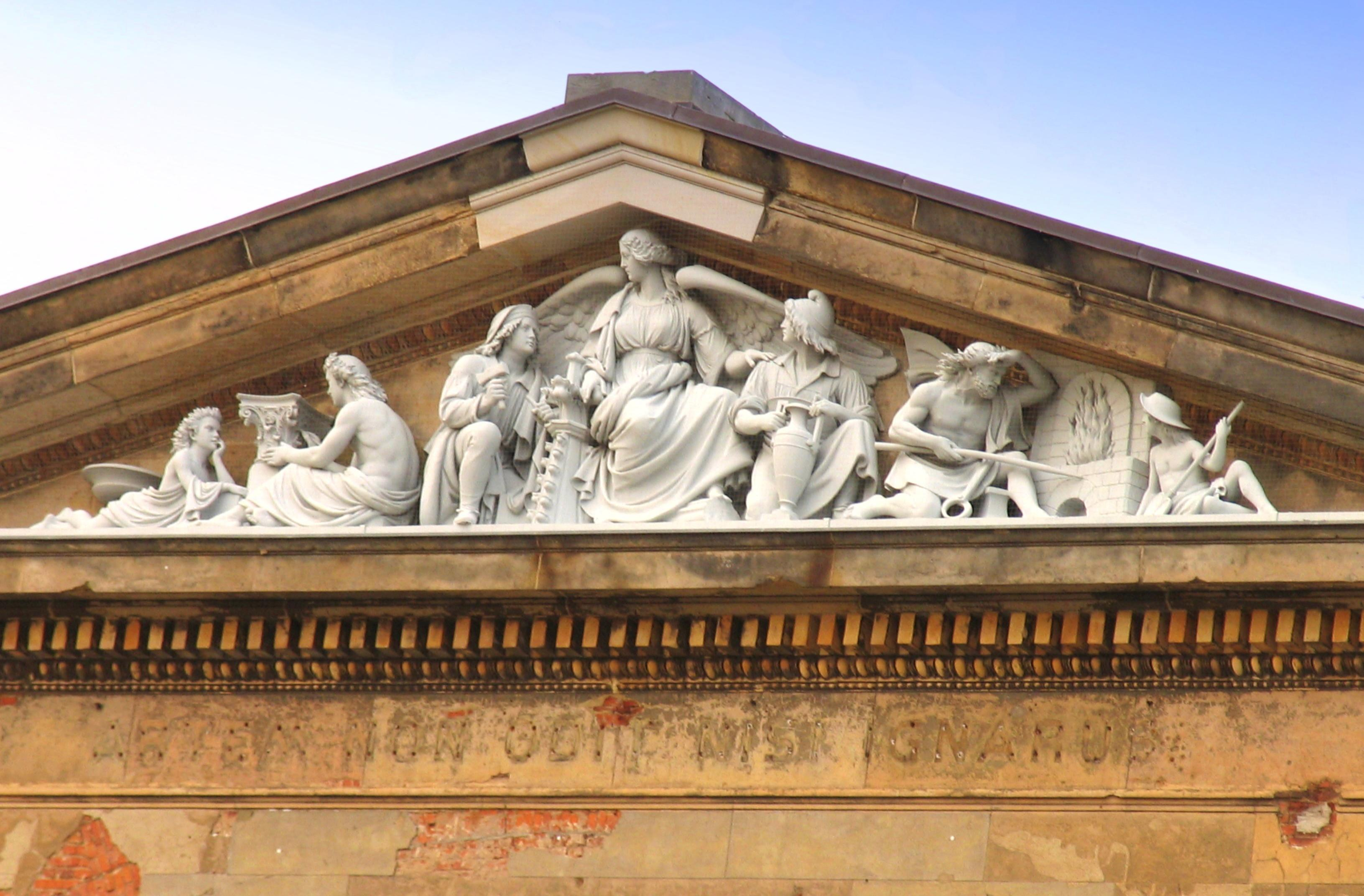
Neues Museum (Berlin) western pediment

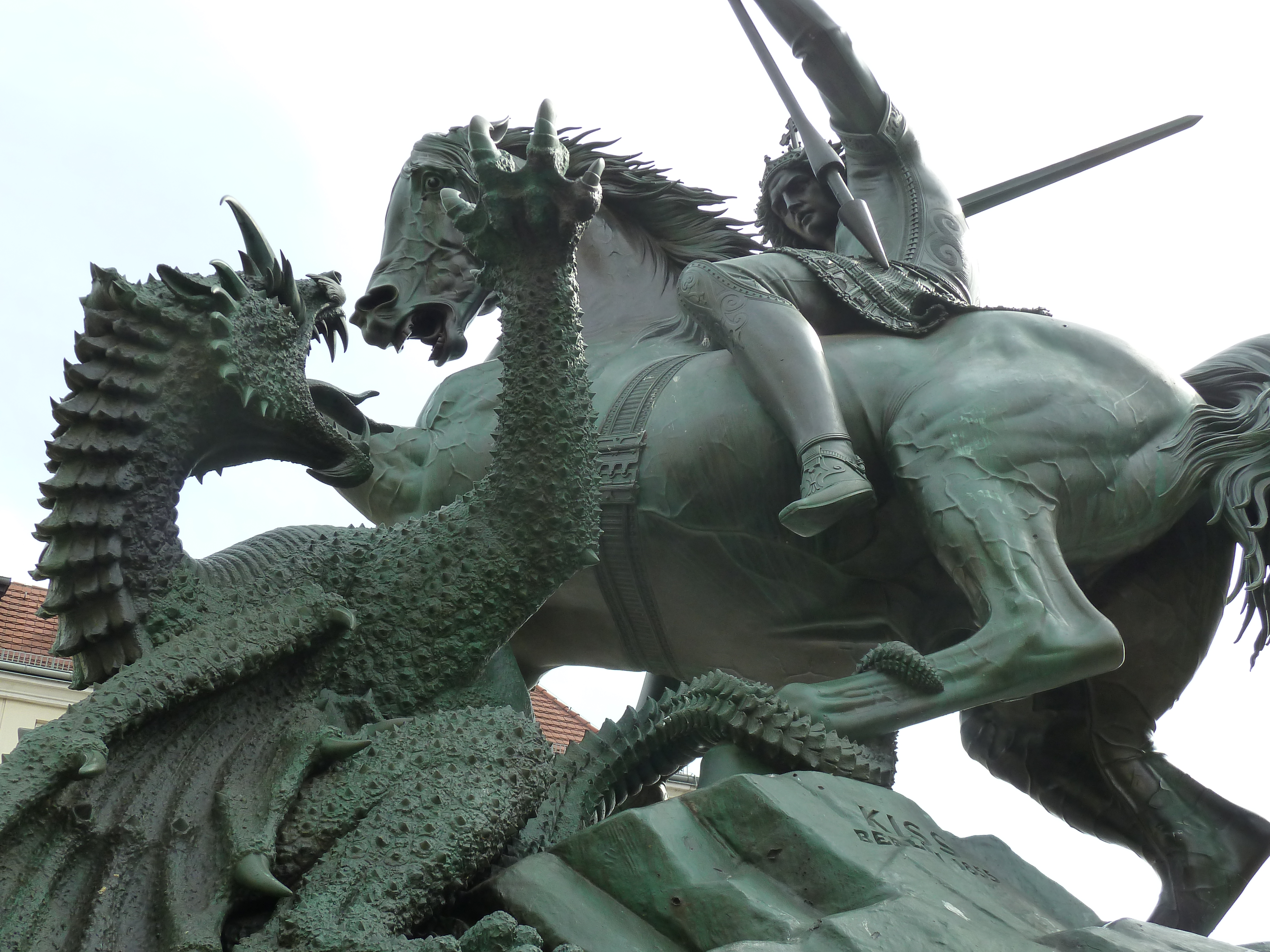
Saint George and the Dragon, Berlin
