= Alfons Zgrzebniok =

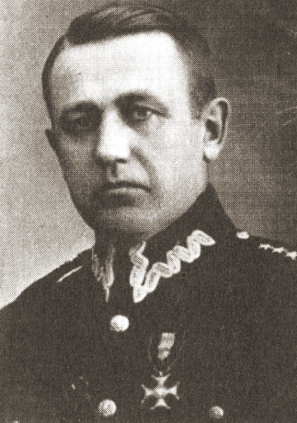
- Captain Alfons Zgrzebniok
- Born: 16 August 1891; Dziergowice, German Empire
- Died: 31 January 1937 (aged 45); Marcinkowice, Poland
- Burial place: Rybnik Cemetery
- Military career
- Allegiance: German Empire; Poland
- Branch: Imperial German Army; Polish Army
- Rank: Kapitan (Captain)
- Nickname: Rakoczy
- Unit: Polish Military Organisation
- Conflicts: World War I Silesian Uprisings
- Awards

Alfons Zgrzebniok (also known by his codename Rakoczy; 16 August 1891 – 31 January 1937) was a Polish teacher, activist, and politician from Silesia. He was one of the cofounders of the Silesian Insurgent Association in the early 1920s and also helped organise the Association for Defense of the Western Border and the Committee for the Defense of Upper Silesia. He commanded the Polish-Silesian forces in both the First and Second Silesian Uprising. He was the recipient of several awards and several schools and other landmarks in Poland are named after him. He has also been the subject of a number of poems and songs.

== Biography ==
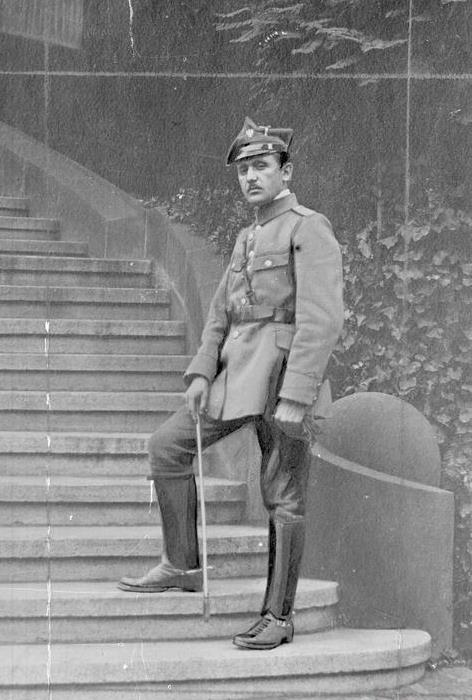
Alfons Zgrzebniok in the Polish Army uniform

Alfons Zgrzebniok was born on 16 August 1891 in Dziergowice (Dziergowitz). He attended a gymnasium in Raciborz (Ratibor). Later, in the early 1910s, he was a student at the University of Wrocław (Breslau), where he joined the Polish youth patriotic organization, the Association of the Polish Youth "Zet". After the start of World War I, he was conscripted to the German Army. By the time the war ended, he was wounded thrice, and he was also promoted to the officer rank of lieutenant.

By late 1918, he joined the Polish Military Organisation (POW), and under Józef Dreyza, he organised local POW networks around Kędzierzyn-Koźle and Racibórz. He advanced through POW ranks, and by February 1919, he was considered one of its leaders in Silesia, and was part of the delegation that proposed an insurrection to the Polish Supreme People's Council in Poznań. In early July, the Council nominated Zgrzebniok to head the Polish Military Organization of Upper Silesia. He was the commander of the First Silesian Uprising (16–26 August 1919). In September, he helped organize the Upper Silesian Militia (Milicja Górnośląska). He collaborated closely with the Polish Plebiscite Commission. On 27 May 1920, he was the commander of the defense of the Commission headquarters in Hotel Lomnitz during a surprise attack by German paramilitary forces. He commanded the Polish-Silesian forces during the Second Silesian Uprising (19–25 August 1920). After POW in Silesia was transformed into the Central of Physical Education (Centrala Wychowania Fizycznego), he became its vice president. He was one of the chief commanders of the Third Silesian Uprising (2 May – 21 July 1921).

During the Second Polish Republic, he was one of the cofounders of the Polish Insurgent Association in the early 1920s. He also helped organise the Association for Defense of the Western Border and the Committee for the Defense of Upper Silesia. He was also promoted to the rank of captain in the Polish Army. From 1923, he worked as a teacher in a high school in Chorzów; he also wrote a number of articles for the local press. That year, he was married to Helena Woźniak. From 1927 he returned to the Polish Army, where until 1931 he was attached to the Polish Delegation to the Free City of Danzig. Near the end of his life, from 1934, he also held the position of the vice-voivode of the Białystok Voivodeship.

He died from a heart attack on 31 January 1937 in Marcinkowice, Nowy Sącz County. He was buried, as per his will, in the Rybnik Cemetery, which houses a section dedicated to the Silesian Insurgents. His funeral was a major event, and has been described as "attended by the entire Polish Silesia".

== Awards and decorations ==
- Order of the White Eagle (posthumously, 2 May 2021)
- Silver Cross of Virtuti Militari
- Cross of Independence with Swords (20 January 1931)
- Officer's Cross of the Order of Polonia Restituta
- Gold Cross of Merit
- Cross of Valour
- Cross on the Silesian Ribbon of Valor and Merit, 1st Class

== Remembrance ==
Several schools and other landmarks in Poland, in particular, Silesia, have been named after him. He was a subject of several poems and songs. Plans to dedicate a plaque in his memory in the school in Chorzów he taught in, in the 1920s, were interrupted by World War II; eventually, the plaque was erected in 1992 in that school, now the Zespół Szkół Technicznych Nr 2.

The Opole Voivodeship declared 2017 to be the Year of Alfons Zgrzebniok in the voivodeship, and a dedicated exhibition was shown in the Museum of the Opole Silesian in Opole.
