= Paweł Kontny =

Polish priest

Paweł Kontny SChr

Priest
- Born: 29 June 1910; Paprotzan, Province of Silesia, German Empire
- Died: 1 February 1945 (aged 34); Lędziny, Silesian Voivodeship, Republic of Poland

Paweł Kontny SChr (29 June 1910 – 1 February 1945) was a Polish priest of the Roman Catholic Church. He was a member of the Society of Christ. During World War II he served as a priest in Lędziny. On 1 February 1945, he was killed by Soviet soldiers while protecting two girls from being kidnapped and raped. The Soviets forced the townspeople to bury Kontny's body in the place where he was killed. Three days later, after the front moved west, the townspeople exhumed Kontny's remains and buried them at the local cemetery. A cause for his beatification is currently being prepared.

== Early life ==
Kontny was born on 29 June 1910 in Paprotzan to Jakub and Jadwiga Kontny. After he graduated from the local primary school he attended the gymnasium in Mikołów. The family's financial troubles led to him to have to work during his vacations. Amongst other places, he worked for a lock smith and at a local coal mine.

== Seminary Formation ==
On 31 August 1932, Kontny entered the novitiate of a newly established religious order, the Society of Christ. He was accepted to the novitiate by the founder of the order, Venerable August Cardinal Hlond. After completing the novitiate, he made his first vows on 16 October 1933. The next day, along with the rest of the first class of Society of Christ seminarians, he began two-year philosophical studies at the Archbishop's Seminary in Gniezno. The rector of the seminary was Blessed Michał Kozal. After completing philosophical studies, Kontny began a four-year theological program at the Archbishop's seminary in Poznań. He made final vows on 18 October 1936.

== Priesthood ==
On 3 June 1939, Kontny was ordained a priest at the Poznań Cathedral by Venerable August Cardinal Hlond. After ordination he left for Estonia where he served the local Polish community. World War II began while he was in Estonia. Despite having received an offer to go to Finland, Kontny, instead, decided to return to Poland.

== World War II ==
On 13 September 1939, Kontny arrived in Lutsk. There he joined his seminary classmate, Fr. Alojzy Dudek. Together, they served at the local cathedral until 30 September 1939. They then traveled to Tychy.

Kontny moved in to his family house in Paprocany, serving as a priest in the local chapel. He worked to have the chapel renovated.

On 28 May 1941, he was arrested for his patriotic and pastoral activities. He was jailed at the Mikołów prison. He was released after two weeks but was forced to move to Lędziny, where he served as a priest at the local parish.

On 28 January 1945, the Soviet Red Army entered Lędziny, pushing out Nazi Germany forces. Thanks to Kontny's fluency in Russian, he managed to negotiate the return of 70 prisoners of war back to their homes. These were soldiers who were drafted into the German army, but whose homes were originally located in the Second Polish Republic.

== Death ==
On 1 February 1945, after the morning mass, two girls ran to the parish house frantically seeking help. They were sent by their mother to call for help against Soviet soldiers seeking to kidnap and rape a couple girls. Kontny quickly ran to the scene where he attempted to negotiate with the Soviet officer. The Soviet officer pulled out his pistol and threatened to kill Kontny if he continued to interfere. Kontny was then grabbed by Soviet soldiers, beaten, his clothes torn, and shot dead. The Soviet officer forced the townspeople to bury Kontny in the place where he was shot.

== Burial ==
After three days, after the war front had moved west, the townspeople exhumed Kontny's body and took it to the local church. On 8 February 1945, a proper funeral was held. Despite difficulties in travel and communication because of the war, a large crowd gathered for the funeral, including ten priests. The main celebrant of the mass was Fr. Jan Wodarz. The homilist was Fr. Jan Klyczka. Kontny was buried in the local cemetery in Lędziny near St. Anne's church. Inscribed on his headstone is a quote alluding with St. John's Gospel. "Like a good shepherd, he gave his life for his sheep."

== Cause for Beatification ==
Calls for his beatification began soon after his death. Due to the Communist regime in Poland after World War II, no work was initially undertaken to open a cause for beatification. After the fall of Communism, the Society of Christ sought to open a cause for his beatification, adding his profile to the newly opening group cause for "Martyrs of the East (Communism 1917-1989)." This cause is still being prepared.

Among many acts to commemorate Kontny's sacrifice and death, a street was named after him in Lędziny.
