= Grenzschutz Ost =

- Some units of Grenzschutz Ost utilized the shield of the Teutonic Order as their official insignia
- Active: 1918–1919
- Disbanded: October 1919
- Country: Germany
- Allegiance: Reichswehr
- Type: Freikorps; Selbstschutz
- Part of: Selbstschutz Oberschlesien
- Engagements: Greater Poland uprising (1918–1919); Polish–Soviet War; First Silesian Uprising; Third Silesian Uprising

Grenzschutz Ost (lit. 'Border Guard East') is the collective name for the German military units (Freikorps, Selbstschutz, volunteer units, Upper Silesian Self-Defence Force, etc.) established in the aftermath of World War I, after the end of the monarchy during the German revolution of 1918–1919 and the ensuing beginning of the Weimar Republic in late 1918–1919.

== History ==
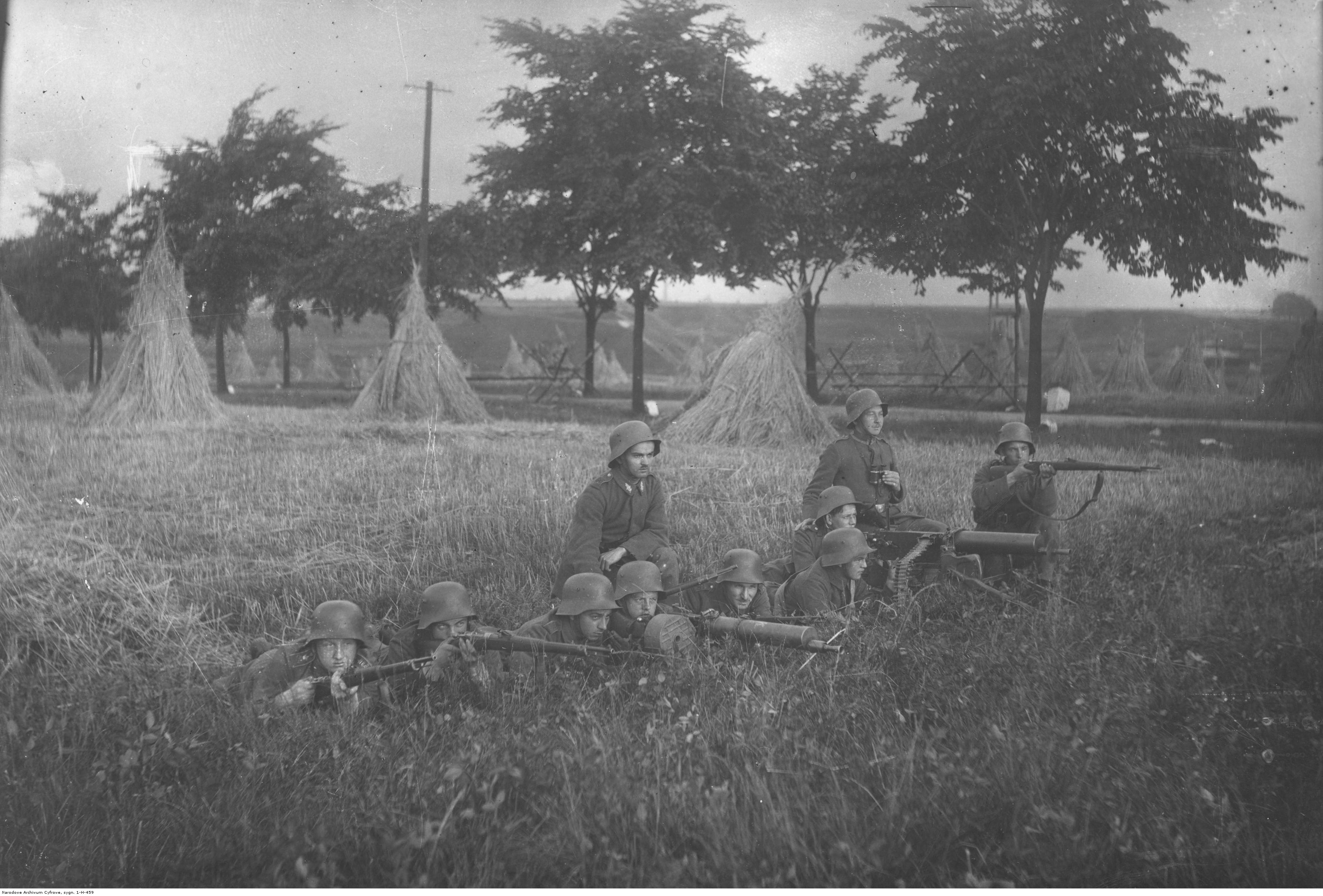
A Grenzschutz unit at its positions. Visible are machine guns: a light MG 08/15 with a drum magazine and a heavy Maxim Model 1908 on a sled mount.

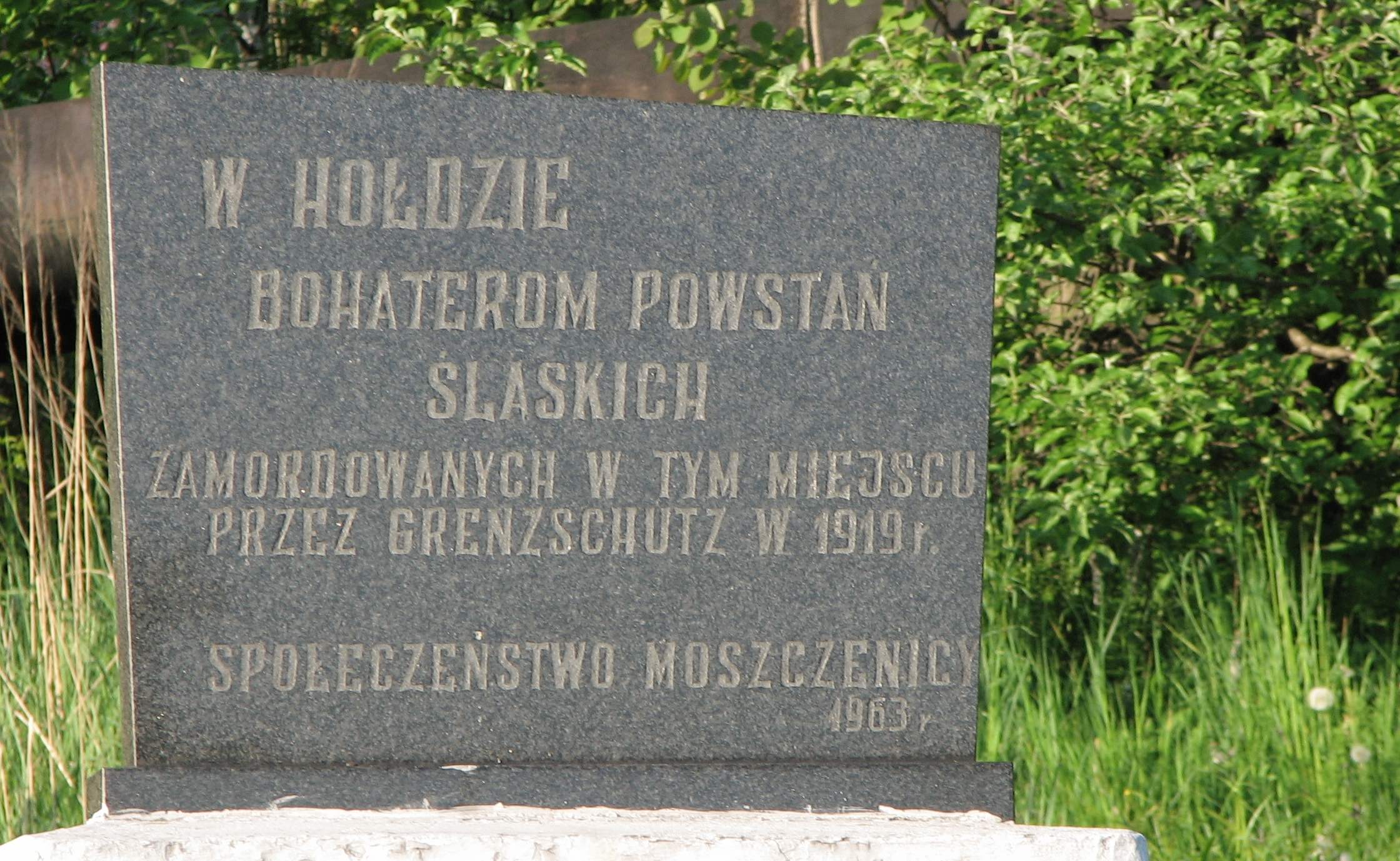
Monument to those murdered by Grenzschutz - Jastrzębie Zdrój - Moszczenica

Grenzschutz Ost was to assume responsibility for protecting the eastern border and eastern territories of the German Reich, particularly against the newly founded Poland, until the border was finally demarcated. The following situations were threatening:

- Greater Poland uprising (1918–1919) from December 1918
- Polish–Soviet War from spring 1919, during which the Soviet Russian Red Army had encircled almost the entire province of East Prussia by August 1920 and was positioned on the former German Polish Corridor
- Uprisings in Upper Silesia from August 1919

The Grenzschutz Ost (lit. 'Eastern Border Guard') formed part of the Provisional Reichswehr and was divided into the Armeeoberkommando North, headquartered in Bartenstein in East Prussia, and the Armeeoberkommando South, headquartered in Breslau. Operational command was exercised by the Oberste Heeresleitung (OHL), whose headquarters had been located in Kolberg since February 1919. In addition, a "Zentrale Grenzschutz Ost" (Zegrost; Central Border Guard East) was established at the Prussian Ministry of War, which was responsible for organizational matters.

Units included were the VI Reserve Corps, XVII Corps and three other corps.

Oberste Heeresleitung; HQ: Kolberg in Pomerania; Chef of OHL: Generalfeldmarschall Paul von Hindenburg First Quartermaster General: Generalleutnant Wilhelm Groener
Zentrale Grenzschutz Ost; HQ: Berlin; Chief of Staff: Major Friedrich Wilhelm von Willisen
AOK Nord; HQ: Bartenstein in East Prussia Commander-in-Chief: Generalleutnant Ferdinand von Quast Chief of Staff: Generalmajor Hans von Seeckt/Oberst Wilhelm Heye	AOK Süd; HQ: Breslau in Silesia; Commander-in-Chief: Generalleutnant Kurt von dem Borne; Chief of Staff: Generalmajor Fritz von Loßberg

In the run-up to the German signing of the Treaty of Versailles in June 1919, plans existed within the Grenzschutz Ost to refuse withdrawal from the disputed territories or even to recapture the territories conquered by Poland, if necessary by accepting a temporary secession of the Prussian eastern provinces from the Reich (see Oststaat-Plan). These plans collapsed after both the Reich government and the OHL (Higher Regional Command) opposed them. In connection with the formation of the Reichswehr of 200,000 men on October 1, 1919, many units were officially disbanded, as were the "Kommandostelle Kolberg," which still existed after the dissolution of the OHL, and the two Army High Commands.

Nevertheless, the Reichswehr adhered to the concept of border protection and maintained structures for the rapid mobilization of forces in the event of a Polish or Soviet advance into German territory. This Black Reichswehr was composed of military units, which at times also included the Sturmabteilung. Numerous former members of the Grenzschutz Ost joined the Freikorps in the Baltic.

The Landesschutzrichtlinie (lit. 'State Protection Directive') was issued in 1929.

Until 1939, the protection of the border in the east was an essential task of the Reichswehr, or later the Wehrmacht, which organized numerous war games and map exercises for this purpose.

== Sources ==
- Bergien, Rüdiger (2012). Die bellizistische Republik: Wehrkonsens und "Wehrhaftmachung" in Deutschland 1918–1933 [The Bellicist Republic: Military Consensus and "Wehrhaftmachung" in Germany 1918–1933] (in German). München: Oldenbourg Wissenschaftsverlag. ISBN 978-3-486-59181-1.
- Nakata, Jun (2002). Der Grenz- und Landesschutz in der Weimarer Republik 1918 bis 1933: die geheime Aufrüstung und die deutsche Gesellschaft [Border and national security in the Weimar Republic 1918 to 1933: secret rearmament and German society] (in German). Rombach, Freiburg im Breisgau: Militärgeschichtliches Forschungsamt. ISBN 3-7930-9331-X.
- Schulze, Hagen (1970). "Der Oststaat-Plan 1919" (PDF). Vierteljahrshefte für Zeitgeschichte (in German). 18 (2). Stuttgart: Deutsche Verlags-Anstalt.
