= Polish Military Organization of Upper Silesia =

Polish Military Organization of the Upper Silesia (Polish: Polska Organizacja Wojskowa Górnego Śląska) was a secret military organization formed in January 1919 in Upper Silesia. It was involved in the three Silesian Uprisings, although officially it was disbanded after the Second Uprising. It had over 20,000 members, including Alfons Zgrzebniok, Jan Wyglenda, Stanisław Krzyżowski, Walenty Fojkis, Karol Grzesik, Rudolf Kornke, Wolfgang Kornke, Maksymilian Iksal.

The organization was composed of six inspectorates:

1. Inspectorate – Bytom, Katowice, Królewska Huta, Zabrze;
2. Inspectorate – Pszczyna, Racibórz, Rybnik;
3. Inspectorate – Gliwice, Tarnowskie Góry;
4. Inspectorate – Lubliniec, Olesno;
5. Inspectorate – Kluczbork, Opole;
6. Inspectorate – Koźle, Prudnik, Strzelce Opolskie.

== See also ==
- Polish Military Organization
