= Karl Höfer =

German Army officer (1862–1939)

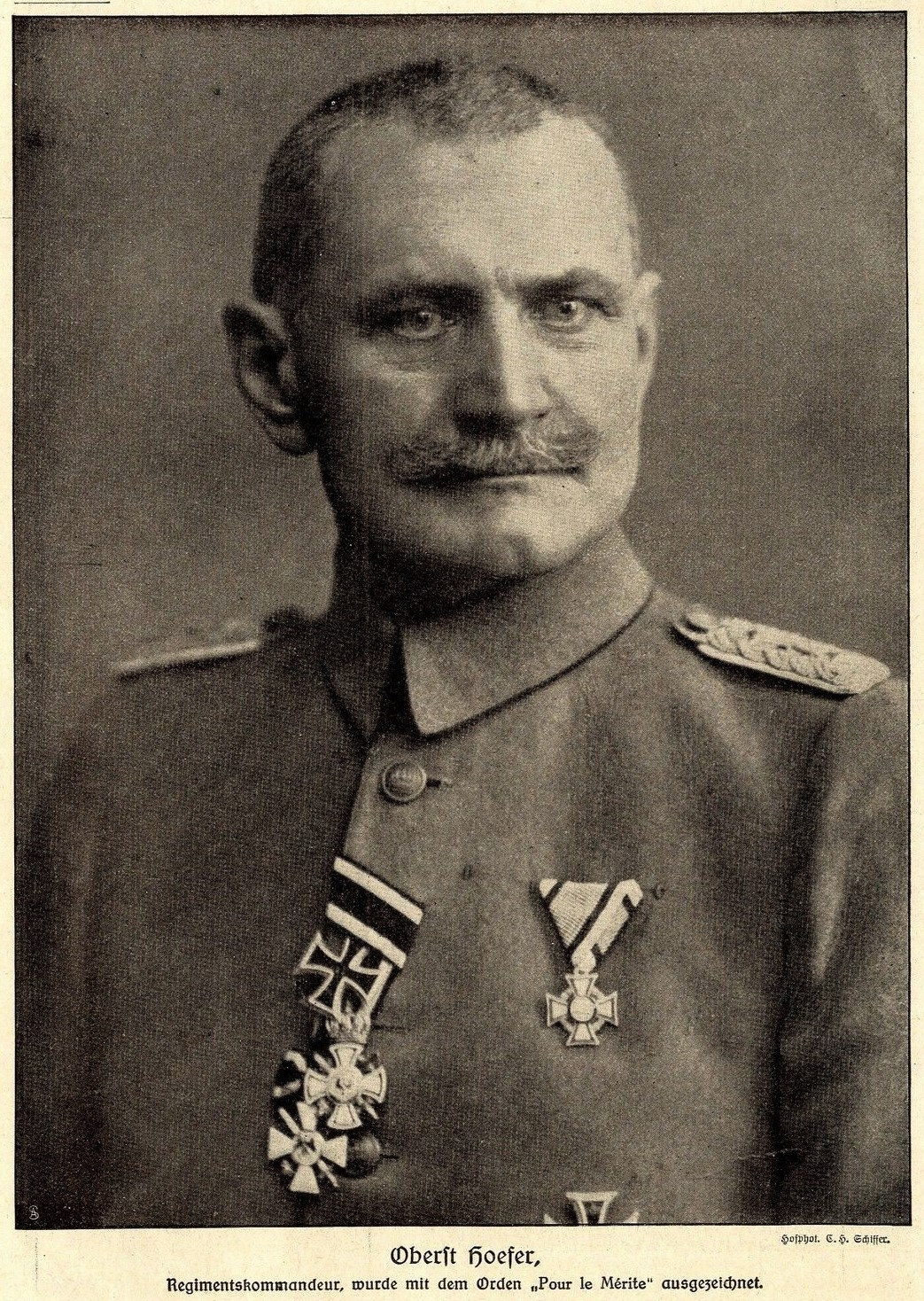
- Höfer in 1916
- Born: December 29, 1862; Pleß, Kingdom of Prussia
- Died: May 12, 1939 (aged 76); Würzburg, Nazi Germany
- Military career
- Allegiance: Weimar Republic; German Empire
- Branch: Reichswehr; Imperial German Army
- Conflicts: First World War; Battle of the Lys; Silesian Uprisings; Battle of Annaberg

Karl Höfer also Hoefer; (29 December 1862 in Pleß – 12 May 1939 in Würzburg) was a German Lieutenant general during World War I he became known as the Held vom Kemmelberge (hero of Kemmel hill) after his division had captured the Kemmelberg during the Fourth Battle of Flanders.

Retired, as "Generalleutnant a. D." ('retired lieutenant general'), Höfer defended German Upper Silesia against Polish insurgents in the Silesian Uprisings in 1921. The Freikorps leaders had agreed upon Höfer as commander; he led them to success in the Battle of Annaberg. In the international press, he was referred to as "General Hoefer" or "Teuton Commander Hoefer".

== Decorations ==
- Pour le Mérite with Oak Leaves
  - Pour le Merite on July 23, 1916
  - Oak Leaves on April 14, 1918 (86th award)

== Works ==
- Karl Hoefer: Oberschlesien in der Aufstandszeit, 1918-1921: Erinnerungen und Dokumente, published by E.S. Mittler & Sohn, 1938, 376 pages
  - reviewed by H. F. P. Percival, International Affairs, Vol. 17, No. 6 (Nov. - Dec., 1938), pp. 853–854 (review consists of 2 pages)
