= Silesian Uprisings =

Separatist uprisings in 1919–1921

- Part of the aftermath of World War I and the Revolutions of 1917–1923
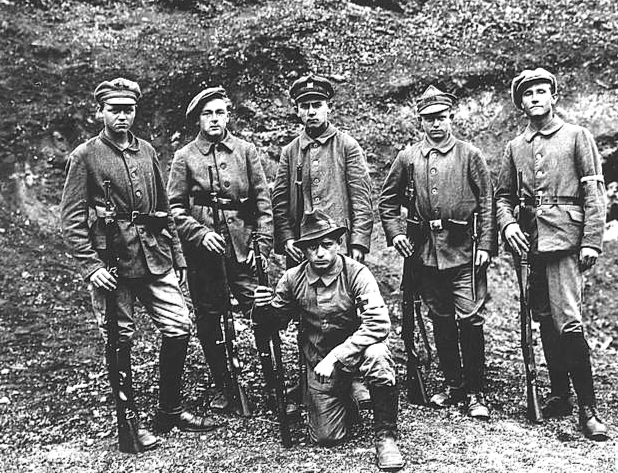
- Silesian insurgents
Date	16 August 1919 – 21 July 1921
Location	Upper Silesia
Result	See Aftermath section
Territorial changes	Division of Silesia between Poland and Germany; Creation of Silesian autonomy in the Second Polish Republic

Belligerents
(Poland) Polish Military Organization of Upper Silesia Supported by: Poland	(Weimar Republic) Germany: Freikorps; Selbstschutz; Inter-Allied Commission: United Kingdom; (Kingdom of Italy) Italy; France

Commanders and leaders
(Poland) Alfons Zgrzebniok (Poland) Franciszek Szkudło † (Poland) Wojciech Korfanty (Poland) Maciej Hrabia Mielzynski	(Weimar Republic) Friedrich Wilhelm von Schwartzkoppen (Weimar Republic) Karl Höfer

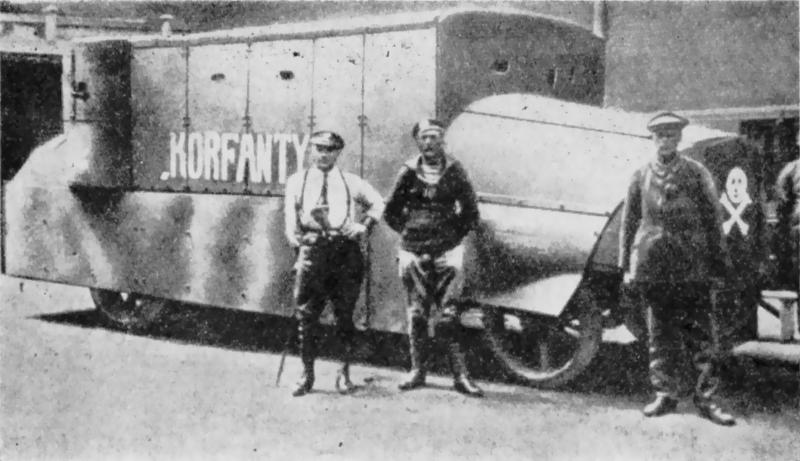
Polish armored car Korfanty in 1920 made by Polish fighters in Woźniak foundry. It was one of the two created; the second was named Walerus – Woźniak.

The Silesian Uprisings (Note: Polish: Powstania śląskie; Silesian: Ślōnske aufsztandy; German: Aufstände in Oberschlesien, Polenaufstände; Czech: Hornoslezská povstání.) were a series of three uprisings from August 1919 to July 1921 in Upper Silesia, which was part of the Weimar Republic at the time. Ethnic Polish and Polish-Silesian insurrectionists, seeking to have the area transferred to the newly founded Polish Republic, fought German police and paramilitary forces, which sought to keep the area part of the new German state founded after World War I and the subsequent revolutions in Germany. Following the conflict, the area was divided between the two countries. The rebellions have subsequently been commemorated in modern Poland as an example of Polish nationalism. Despite central government involvement in the conflict, Polish historiography renders the events as uprisings reflecting the will of ordinary Upper Silesians rather than a war. (Note: "Thus, within the first three postwar years, Poland waged war against Ukraine, Lithuania, the USSR, Czechoslovakia, and Germany. Polish historiography refers to the first four conflicts as "wars" while calling the encounters with Germany grassroots "uprisings" or "insurgencies", despite central government involvement")

In total, several thousand people may have died violently in the militant clashes in Upper Silesia between 1919 and 1921. About four fifths of the victims were killed during the three Silesian uprisings, three fifths alone during the Third Silesian uprising in 1921.

However, due to the success of the Silesian Uprisings, Poland gained coal mines and territory that accelerated their economic development. If it were not for the success of the Third Silesian Uprising, most of the Silesian industrial area would have ended up in Germany's hands, leaving Poland an agrarian state. Additionally, the reconstruction of Poland, post WWI, would have been slower, hindering currency reform and the establishment of the Bank of Poland.

== Background ==
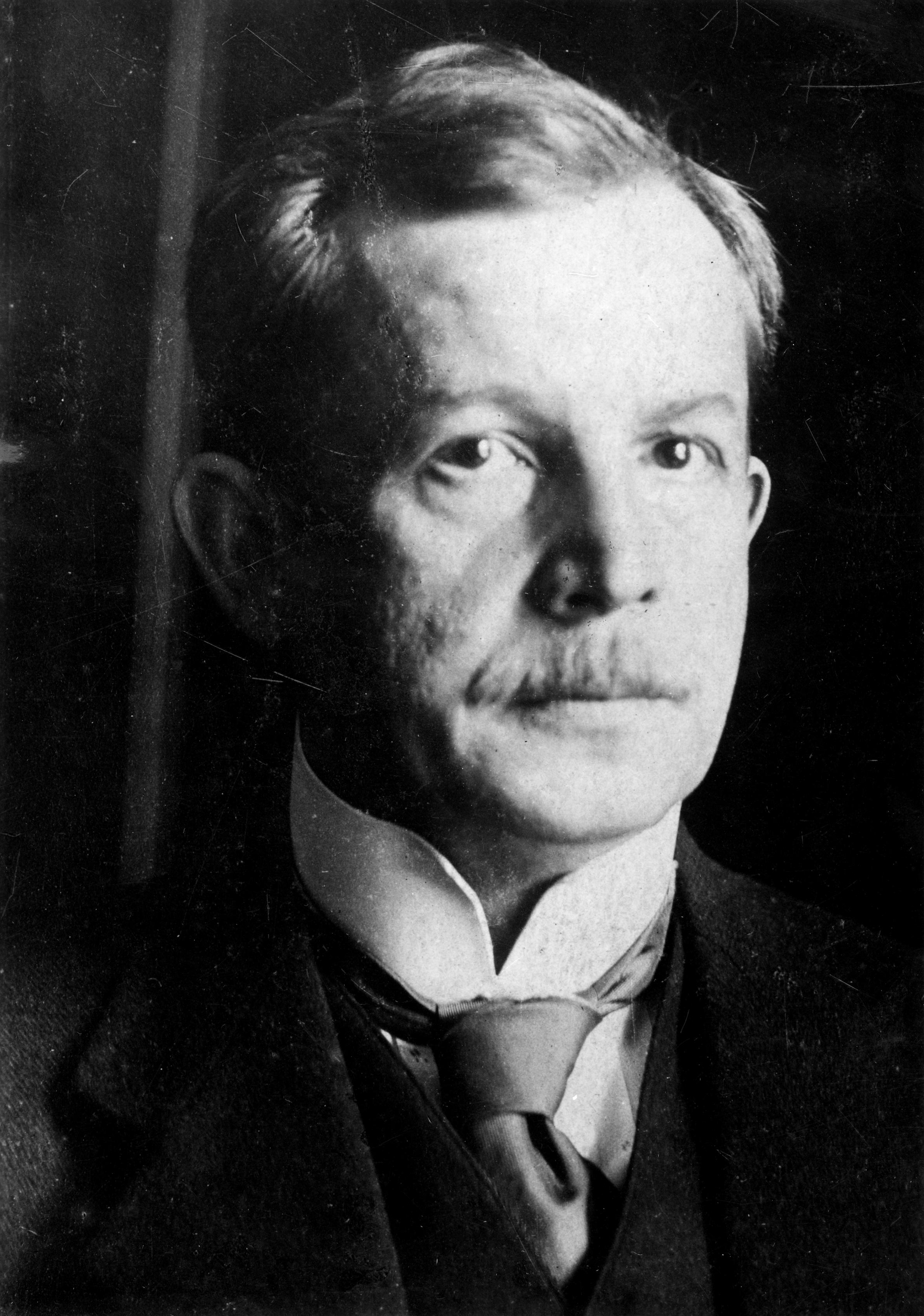
Wojciech Korfanty organised the Third Polish Silesian Uprising in Upper Silesia.

Much of Silesia had belonged to the Crown of Polish Kingdom in medieval times (or to the Duchy of Silesia since 1138 as a result of the Testament of Bolesław III Wrymouth), but it passed to the Kings of Bohemia under the Holy Roman Empire in the 14th century. Following the death of Louis II of Hungary in the Battle of Mohács, Silesia became part of the Habsburg monarchy when Ferdinand I of Austria was elected as the King of Bohemia. Frederick the Great of Prussia seized Silesia from Maria Theresa of Austria in 1742 in the War of Austrian Succession, after which it became a part of Prussia and subsequently, in 1871, the German Empire. Although the province of Silesia overall had by then become Germanised through the Ostsiedlung and later the Kulturkampf, Poles constituted a majority in Upper Silesia.

=== Mineral resources ===
Upper Silesia was bountiful in mineral resources and heavy industry, with mines, iron and steel mills. The Silesian mines were responsible for almost a quarter of Germany's annual output of coal, 81% of its zinc and 34% of its lead.

After World War I, during the negotiations of the Treaty of Versailles, the German government claimed that, without Upper Silesia, it would not be able to fulfill its obligations with regard to reparations to the Allies.

=== Demographics in the early 20th century ===
The area in Upper Silesia east of the Oder was dominated by ethnic Poles, most of whom were working class. Most spoke a dialect of Polish, a few felt they were a Slavic group of their own called Silesians. In contrast, most of the local middle and upper classes were ethnic Germans, including the landowners, businessmen, factory owners, local government, police, and Catholic clergy. The population of Upper Silesia was overwhelmingly Catholic with 92% of the people being Roman Catholic. Most of the 8% of Upper Silesians who were Protestant tended to be Germans, but the linguistic and ethnic divide between Catholic Germans and Poles tended to subsume their shared religion.

In the German census of 1900, 65% of the population of the eastern part of Silesia was recorded as Polish-speaking, which decreased to 57% in 1910. This was partly a result of forced Germanisation, but was also due to the creation of a bilingual category, which reduced the number of Polish speakers. American Paul Weber drew up a language map that showed that in 1910, in most of the Upper Silesian districts east of the Oder river, Polish-speaking Silesians constituted a majority, forming more than 70% of the population there.

While still under German control, various Poles identified as Silesians would write, publish, distribute pamphlets, newsletters and other written material, promoting the idea of a Polish-Silesian Identity. Included among the statements within these texts was adherence to the Roman Catholic church. One such publisher was Ignacy Bulla (later changed to Buła in celebration), who would spread information related to these principles at risk to his own life and freedom. He is widely credited with having inspired the Polish-Silesian patriotic feelings that inspired the uprisings. His contribution to bringing Silesia back into the Roman Catholic Church was the subject of at least one dissertation presented by a Seminary student.

=== World War I ===
As a frontier area, Upper Silesia was placed under martial law in August 1914 and remained so for the rest of the war. The German military administrators distrusted the Poles, taking the viewpoint that, as Slavs, they were naturally sympathetic towards the Russians, and governed Upper Silesia in a very high-handed and harsh manner. The First World War was a period in Upper Silesia of collapsing living standards as wages failed to keep up with inflation; almost everyone suffered from shortages of food and working hours were increased in the mines and factories. The nationalist climate produced by the Spirit of 1914, with its sense that all Germans should rally behind the Kaiser in the war effort, led members of Germany's Polish minority to feel more excluded and marginalised than before 1914. The subject of an independent Polish state was first raised by the Germans and Austrians, who in 1916 created a puppet Polish state on the territory of Congress Poland, the lands of which were taken from the Russian Empire in 1915. The way in which the Allies promoted the promise of an independent Poland after the war, most notably in the 14 Points issued by the American president Woodrow Wilson, led to hopes within the Polish community within the Reich that Poland might be reborn again after an Allied victory. During World War I, about 56,000 men from Upper Silesia were killed fighting in the war, with the heaviest losses being taken at the Battle of the Somme in 1916.

=== Versailles plebiscite ===
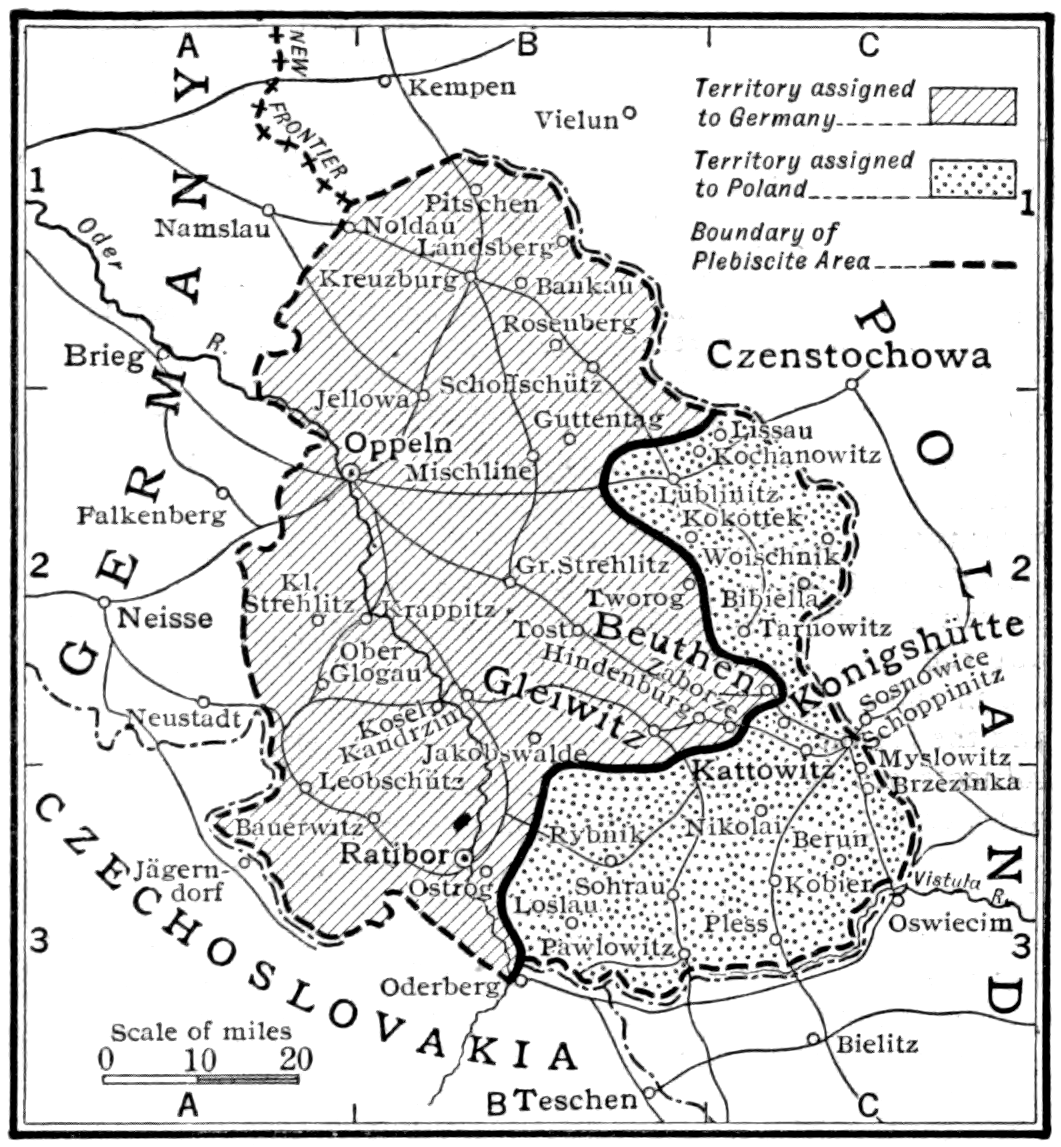
Upper Silesian frontier, 1921

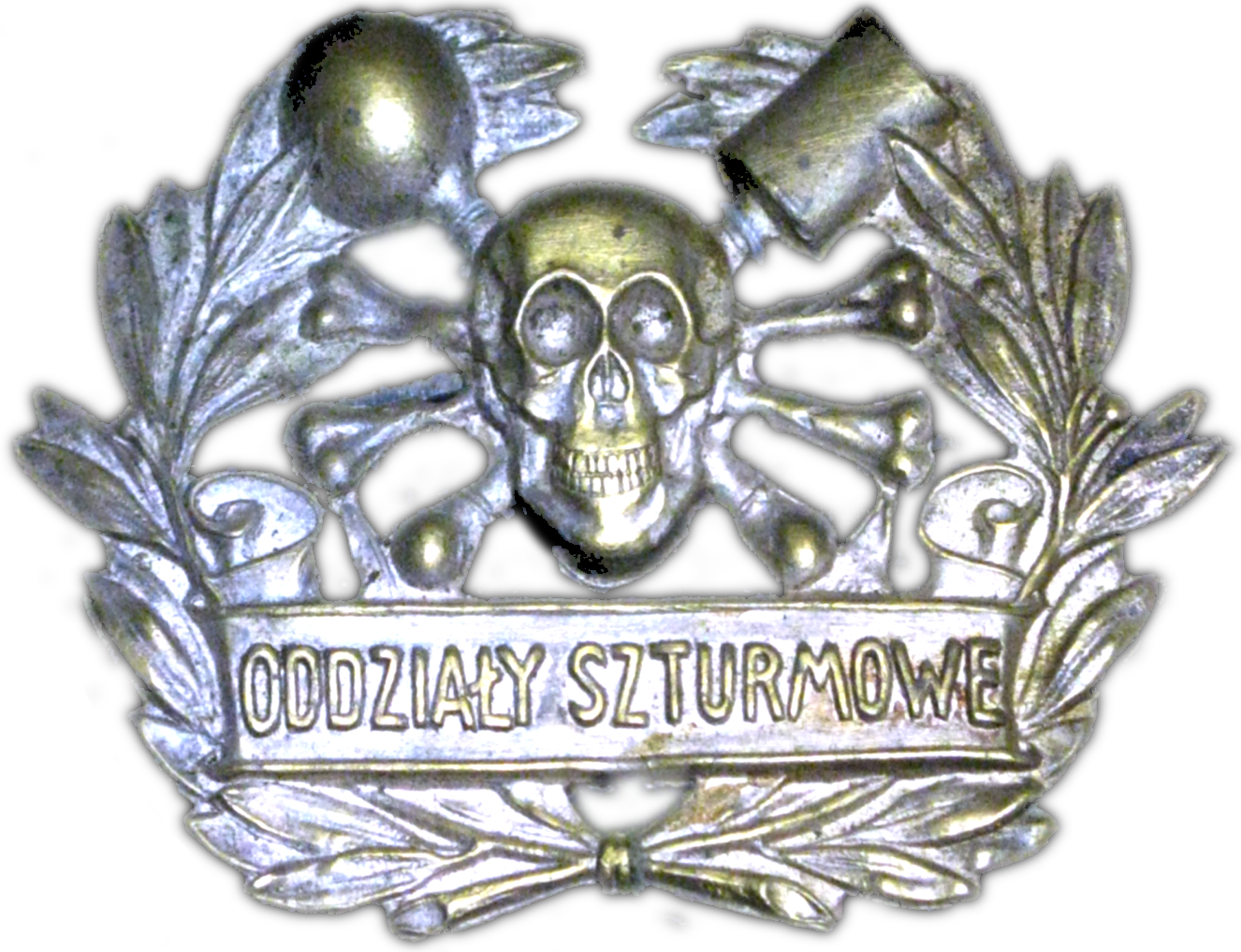
Cap badge of the Polish Storm Detachment during Silesian Uprisings

During the Paris Peace Conference in 1919, a strong division emerged between the British prime minister David Lloyd George, who wanted Upper Silesia to remain within Germany, and the French premier Georges Clemenceau, who supported the Polish claim to Upper Silesia. The Treaty of Versailles, signed in 1919, had ordered a plebiscite in Upper Silesia to determine whether the territory should be a part of Germany or Poland. The plebiscite was to be held within two years of the Treaty in the whole of Upper Silesia, although the Polish government had only requested it to be held in the areas east of the Oder river, which had a significant number of Polish speakers. Thus, the plebiscite took place in all of Upper Silesia, including the predominantly Polish-speaking areas in the east and the predominantly German-speaking areas west of the river. The Upper Silesian plebiscite was to be conducted on 20 March 1921. In the meantime, the German administration and police remained in place. The requirement for a referendum in Upper Silesia in the Treaty of Versailles was a compromise to resolve the Anglo-French dispute at the Paris Peace Conference..

Meanwhile, propaganda and strong arm tactics by both sides led to increasing unrest. The German authorities warned that those voting for Poland might forfeit their jobs and pensions. Pro-Polish activists argued that, under Polish rule, Silesian Poles would no longer be discriminated against. Poland also promised to honour their German state social benefits, such as the old age pensions. However, many German Army veterans joined the Freikorps (Free Corps), a paramilitary organisation whose troops fought any pro-Polish activists. The pro-Poland side employed the Polish Military Organisation (POW) – a secret military organisation and predecessor of Polish intelligence – to fight back with the same force.

The majority of the men serving in the para-military forces on both sides were veterans of the First World War and were experienced soldiers, accustomed to fighting and killing. In addition, most of the men serving on the German side had served in the Freikorps ("Free Corps"), units of volunteers raised by the government to fight against the possibility of a Communist revolution. Most of the men serving on the Polish side had previously served in the German military during World War I.

Eventually, the deteriorating situation resulted in the Upper Silesian Uprisings conducted by Poles in 1919 and 1920.

The right to vote was granted to all aged 20 and older who either had been born in or lived in the plebiscite area. A result was the mass migration of both Germans and Poles. The German newcomers accounted for 179,910, while Polish newcomers numbered over 10,000. Without these "new voters", the pro-German vote would have had a majority of 58,336 instead of the final 228,246. The plebiscite took place as arranged on 20 March. A total of 707,605 votes were cast for Germany and 479,359 for Poland.

The Third Silesian Uprising, conducted by Poles, broke out in 1921, supported by thousands of troops from outside the region mobilised by the Polish government... (Note: "Reacting to the outcome of the plebiscite, Wojciech Koranty ordered the third Silesian insurgency on the symbolic day of 3 May [...] The Polish government and military clearly instigated this offensive, for example, by mobilising thousands of troops from outside of the region to join the local insurgents) The League of Nations was asked to settle the dispute before it led to even more bloodshed. In 1922, a six-week debate decided that Upper Silesia should be divided. This was accepted by both countries and the majority of Upper Silesians. Approximately 736,000 Poles and 260,000 Germans thus found themselves now in Polish (Upper) Silesia, and 532,000 Poles and 637,000 Germans remained in German (Upper) Silesia.

== Uprisings ==
=== First Uprising (1919) ===
First Silesian Uprising
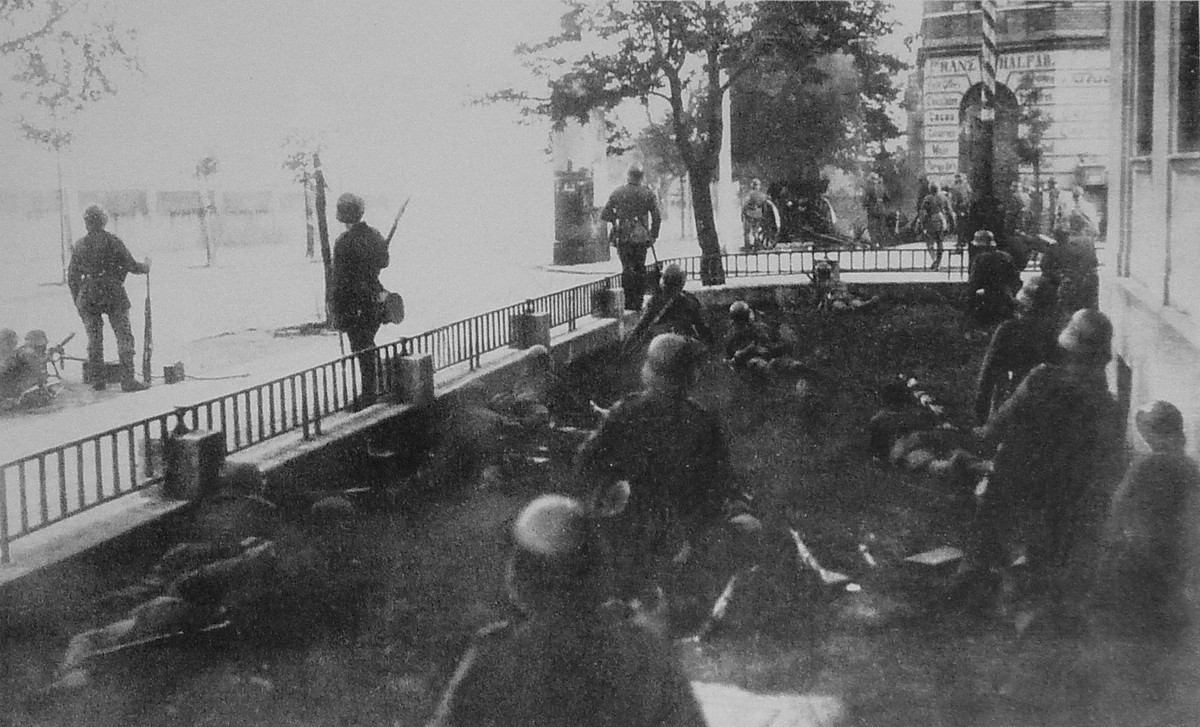
- Reichswehr forces fighting insurgents in Myslowitz during the First Silesian Uprising.
Date	16–26 August 1919
Location	Parts of Upper Silesia
Result	German victory

Belligerents
(Germany) Grenzschutz Ost; Reichswehr	(Poland) POW G.Śl.

Commanders and leaders
Karl Höfer	Alfons Zgrzebniok; Franciszek Szkudło †

Casualties and losses
Unknown	2,500 rebels killed or executed
- About 9,000 Polish refugees

On 15 August 1919, German border guards (Grenzschutz Ost) massacred ten Silesian civilians in a labour dispute at the Mysłowice mine (Myslowitzer Grube). The massacre sparked protests from the Silesian Polish miners, including a general strike of about 140,000 workers, and caused the First Silesian uprising against German control of Upper Silesia. The miners demanded that the local government and police become ethnically mixed to include both Germans and Poles.

About 21,000 German soldiers of the Weimar Republic's Provisional National Army (Vorläufige Reichsheer), with about 40,000 troops held in reserve, quickly put down the uprising. The army's reaction was harsh, with 2,500 Poles either hanged or executed by firing squad for their parts in the protest. Some 9,000 ethnic Poles sought refuge in the Second Polish Republic, taking along their family members. This came to an end when Allied forces were brought in to restore order, and the refugees were allowed to return later that year.

=== Second Uprising (1920) ===
Second Silesian Uprising
Date	19–25 August 1920
Location	Upper Silesia
Result	Polish victory

Belligerents
(Poland) Polish Military Organization	(Germany) German civil government and police of Upper Silesia	Allied Plebiscite Commission Military Forces

The Second Silesian Uprising (Polish: Drugie powstanie śląskie) was the second of the three uprisings.

In February 1920, an Allied Plebiscite Commission was sent to Upper Silesia. It was composed of representatives of the Allied forces, mostly from France, with smaller contingents from the United Kingdom and Italy. Soon, however, it became apparent that the Allied forces were too few to maintain order. Further, the commission was torn apart by a lack of consensus: the British and Italians favored the Germans, while the French supported the Poles. The British blamed this situation on France's intent on limiting Germany's industrial might. Those forces failed to prevent continuing unrest.

In August 1920, a German newspaper in Upper Silesia printed what later turned out to be a false announcement of the fall of Warsaw to the Red Army in the Polish–Soviet War. Pro-German activists spontaneously organised a march to celebrate what they assumed would be the end of independent Poland. The volatile situation quickly degenerated into violence as pro-German demonstrators began looting Polish shops; the violence continued even after it had become clear that Warsaw had not fallen.

On 19 August, the violence eventually led to a Polish uprising which quickly resulted in the occupation of government offices in the districts of Kattowitz (Katowice), Pless (Pszczyna) and Beuthen (Bytom). Between 20 and 25 August, the rebellion spread to Königshütte (Chorzów), Tarnowitz (Tarnowskie Góry), Rybnik, Lublinitz (Lubliniec) and Gross Strehlitz (Strzelce Opolskie). The Allied Commission declared its intention to restore order, but internal differences kept anything from being done; British representatives held the French responsible for the easy spread of the uprising through the eastern region.

The fighting was slowly brought to an end in September by a combination of allied military operations and negotiations between the parties. The Poles obtained the disbanding of the Sipo police and the creation of a new police (Abstimmungspolizei) for the area, which would be 50% Polish. Poles were also admitted to the local administration. The Polish Military Organisation in Upper Silesia was supposed to be disbanded, though in practice this did not happen.

=== Third Uprising (1921) ===
Third Silesian Uprising
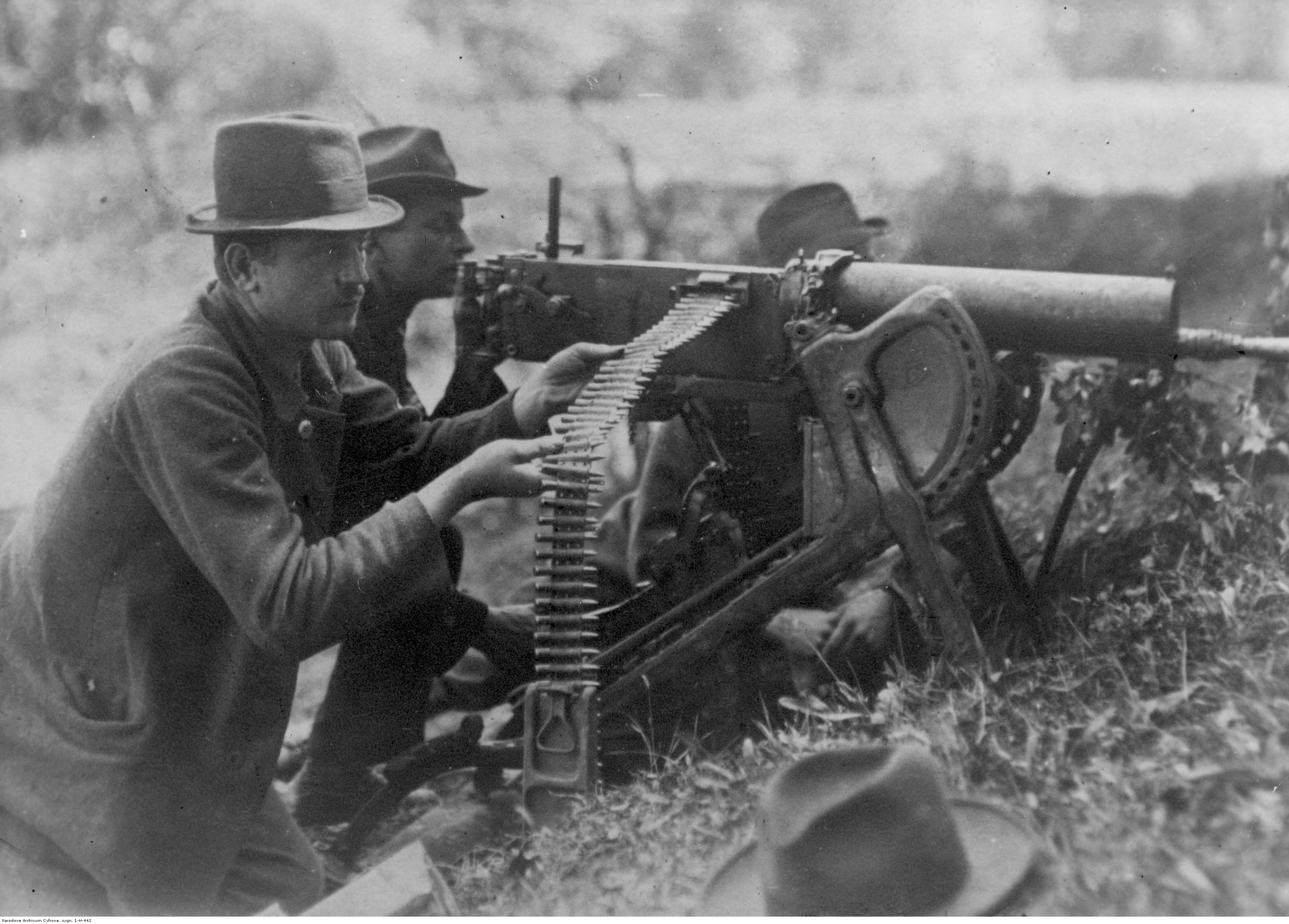
- Silesian insurgents behind an MG 08 machine gun in action along the Oder river
Date	2 May – 21 July 1921
Location	Upper Silesia
Result	League of Nations forces a ceasefire

Belligerents
(Germany) Grenzschutz; Freikorps; Selbstschutz	(Poland) Polish Military Organisation	Inter-Allied Commission: United Kingdom; (Kingdom of Italy) Italy

Commanders and leaders
Friedrich Wilhelm von Schwartzkoppen; Karl Höfer; Hans Heinrich XVII Hochberg	Wojciech Korfanty; Maciej Hrabia Mielzynski	Jules Gratier; Filippo Salvioni; William Heneker

Strength
	40,000	

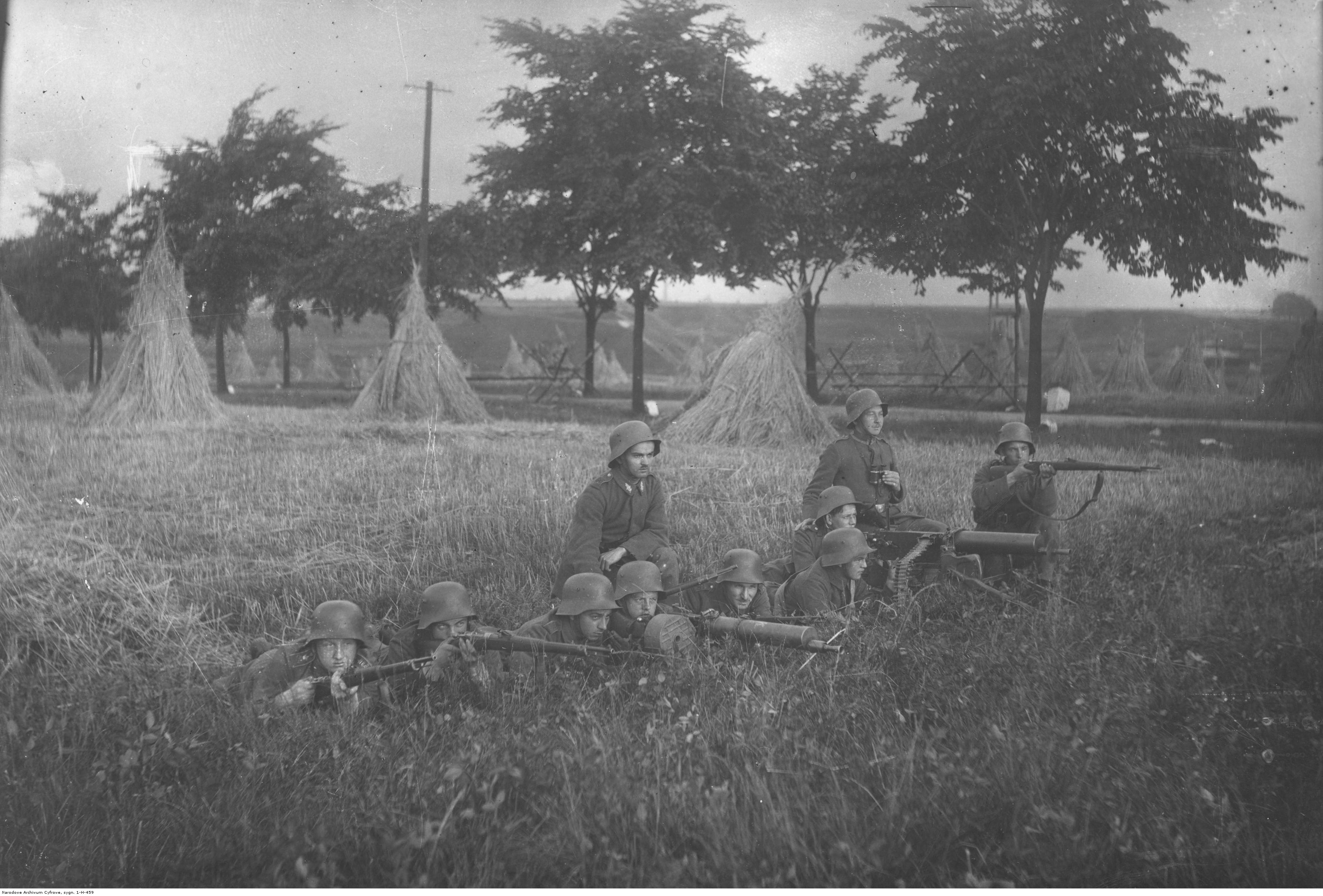
Opposing the Silesian insurrectionists were the Grenzschutz "border guards" of the Weimar Republic.

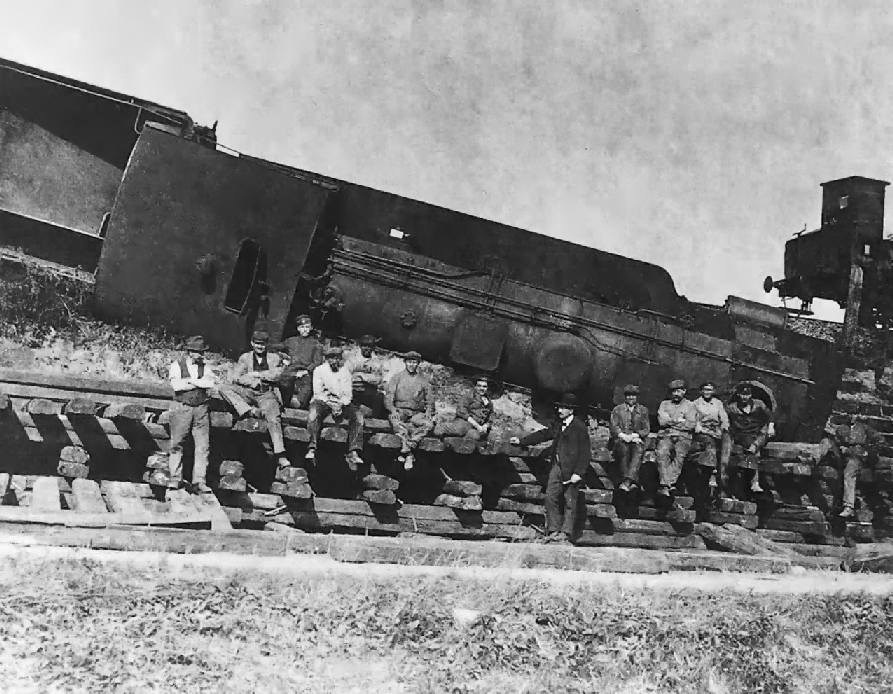
Train derailed by the insurgents near Kędzierzyn

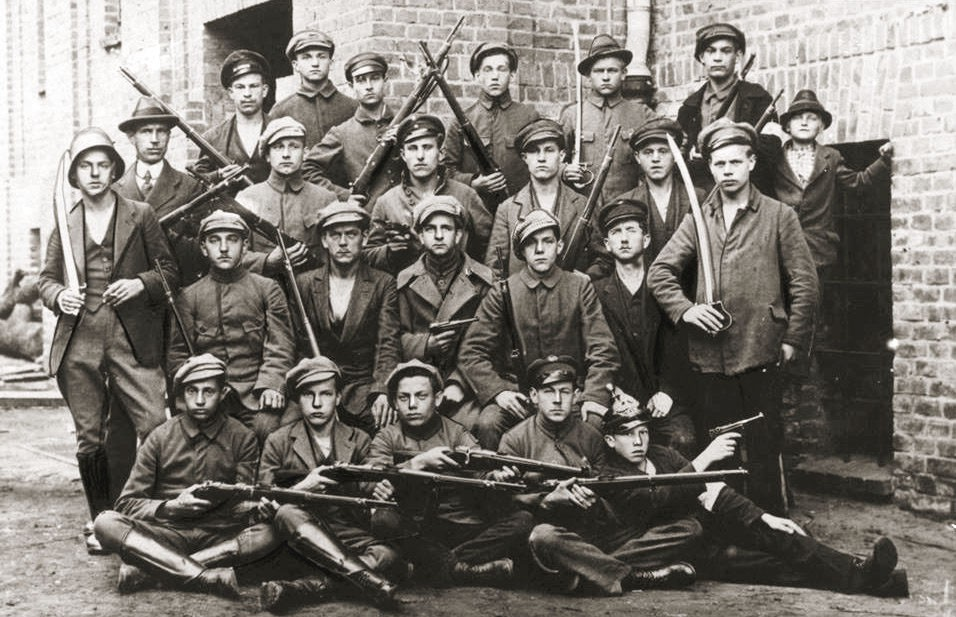
Polish insurgents unit in 1921

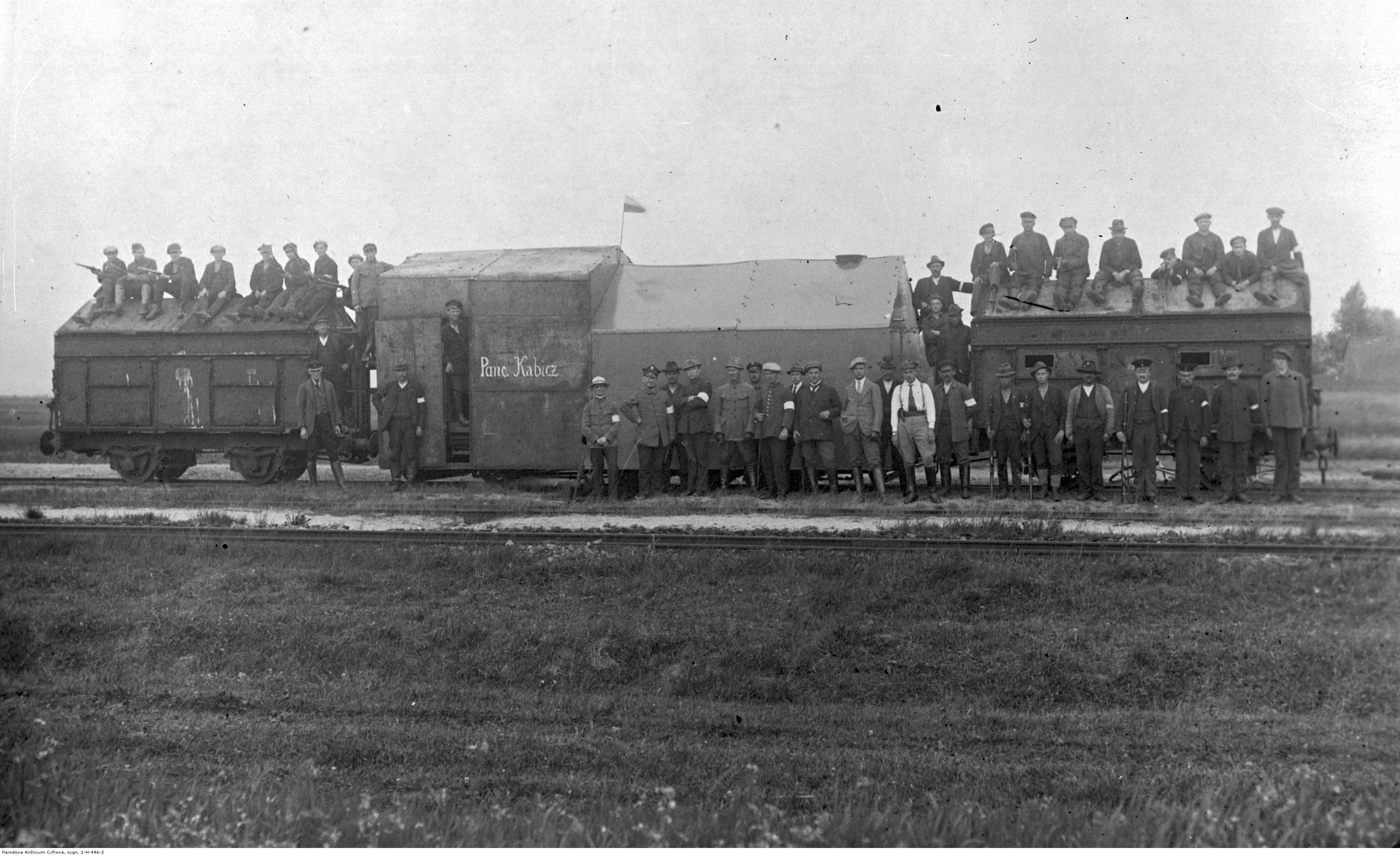
Armoured train "Kabicz" of Polish insurrectionist forces comprising a T 37 steam locomotive with improvised armour cladding and two coal hopper cars.

The Third Silesian Uprising (Polish: Trzecie powstanie śląskie) was the last, largest and longest of the three uprisings. It included Battle of Annaberg and Battle of Olza and began in the aftermath of a plebiscite that yielded mixed results. The British and French governments could not reach a consensus on the interpretation of the plebiscite. The primary problem was the disposition of the "Industrial Triangle" east of the Oder river, whose triangle ends were marked by the cities of Beuthen (Bytom), Gleiwitz (Gliwice) and Kattowitz (Katowice). The French wanted to weaken Germany, and thus supported Polish claims on the territory; the British and the Italians disagreed, in part because the German government declared that a loss of the Silesian industries would render Germany incapable of paying the demanded war reparations. Devising a frontier that was mutually acceptable to both sides proved to be impossible because in many of the contested districts of Upper Silesia, the people in the urban areas tended to vote for staying in Germany, while the rural areas voted for going to Poland. Thus, any division would mean that a number of people would end up on the "wrong" side of the frontier.

In late April 1921, rumours spread that the British position would prevail, prompting the local Polish activists to organise an uprising. The insurrection was to begin in early May. Having learned from previous failures, the Third War was carefully planned and organized under the leadership of Wojciech Korfanty. It started on 2–3 May 1921, with the destruction of German rail bridges (see "Wawelberg Group") in order to slow down the movement of German reinforcements. A particular concern was to prevent the recurrence of violent acts against Polish civilians by members of the Freikorps, demobilised Imperial German army units that had refused to disband. These paramilitary units existed throughout Germany and usually acted independently from both the provisional official army and the leadership of the fledgling German Republic. However, the Reich government subsidised these groups and thus had much leverage over them. The most violent and the most aggressive of the Freikorps units sent into Upper Silesia was the Freikorps Oberland from Bavaria, which seemed to have been the unit most responsible for the atrocities on the German side.

The Inter-Allied Commission, in which General Henri Le Rond was the most influential individual, delayed taking any steps to end the violence. The French troops generally favored the insurrection, while in some cases, British and Italian contingents actively cooperated with the Germans. UK prime minister Lloyd George's speech in the British Parliament, strongly disapproving of the insurrection, aroused the hopes of some Germans, but the Entente appeared to have no troops ready and available for dispatch. The only action the "Inter-Allied Military Control Commission" and the French government made was demanding immediate prohibition of the recruiting of German volunteers from outside Upper Silesia, and this was promptly made public.

After the initial success of the insurgents in taking over a large portion of Upper Silesia, the German Grenzschutz several times resisted the attacks of Wojciech Korfanty's Polish troops, in some cases with the cooperation of British and Italian troops. An attempt on the part of the British troops to take steps against the Polish forces was prevented by General Jules Gratier, the French commander-in-chief of the Allied troops. Eventually, the insurgents kept most of the territory they had won, including the local industrial district. They proved that they could mobilise large amounts of local support, while the German forces based outside Silesia were barred from taking an active part in the conflict.

The fighting in Upper Silesia was characterised by numerous atrocities on both sides, with rape and mutilation being integral and routine methods of war. The men of both sides tended to conflate "national honor" and their sense of masculinity with their perceived ability to "protect" the women of their respective communities from the other side. For both sides, rape served as a way to symbolically "unman" the men of the other side by proving that they were incapable of defending their women and as a way of asserting their power over the women of the other side, hence the frequency of rape. Complaints about rape by both sides started to become common after the 1919 uprising, but were most common after the 1921 uprising. The British historian Tim Wilson wrote about sexual violence by the German forces: "Eighteen such incidents can be easily verified. Many of these were multiple rapes; in other cases of mass rape, the number of victims was not even given". In September 1922, the Polish government submitted a detailed dossier about the rape of Polish Upper Silesian women to the League of Nations. Wilson also wrote that the rape of women believed to be supporting the German cause by "Polish militants" was "relatively common".

Mutilation by both sides was a common tactic as a way to show dominance over the other side. Both sides liked to mutilate the faces of their victims to the point of obliterating the face as a way to show their dominance by robbing the victim of not only their lives, but even their identities that they held in life. Reports from the British officers state that the "corpses of both men and women have been mutilated". The most common means of mutilation was by smashing the face with rifle butts into a bloody mash. Likewise, castration of prisoners was a common tactic, again as a way to show dominance and to literally "unman" the other side. Violence against the genitals was the second most common form of mutilation of faces. One British Army officer wrote in 1921, "It is revolting the number of murders that took place, generally at night and in the woods, which no amount of patrolling could stop. For instance, a one-armed German ex-soldier was taken out and murdered by the Poles one night, and the same night the French reported several murders by the Germans near their post in the woods close by". Wilson wrote that these tactics were not "the triumph of innate barbarism in the absence of social constraint", but rather were tactics quite consciously chosen to express contempt and dominance. Much of the grotesque violence was due to the fluidity of identities in Upper Silesia, where many people saw themselves as neither German nor Polish, but rather Silesian, thus leading nationalists to take extreme measures to polarise society into diametrically opposed blocs. In May–June 1921, at least 1,760 people were killed in the fighting in Upper Silesia.

The support of France for Poland proved to be crucial. On 23 May 1921, the Freikorps defeated the Poles at the Battle of Annaberg, which in turn led to a French ultimatum demanding that the Reich cease at once its support of the German para-military forces. The next day, much to the shock of the Freikorps who were expecting to follow up their victory by keeping all of Upper Silesia for Germany, the German president Frederich Ebert bowed to the ultimatum and banned the Freikorps.

Twelve days after the outbreak of the insurrection, Korfanty offered to take his troops behind a line of demarcation (the "Korfanty Line"), conditional on the released territory not being re-occupied by German forces, but by Allied troops. It was not, however, until 1 July that the British troops arrived in Upper Silesia and began to advance in company with those of the other Allies towards the former frontier. Simultaneously, with this advance, the Inter-Allied Commission pronounced a general amnesty for the illegal actions committed during the insurrection, with the exception of acts of revenge and cruelty. The German Grenzschutz was withdrawn and disbanded.

== Aftermath ==
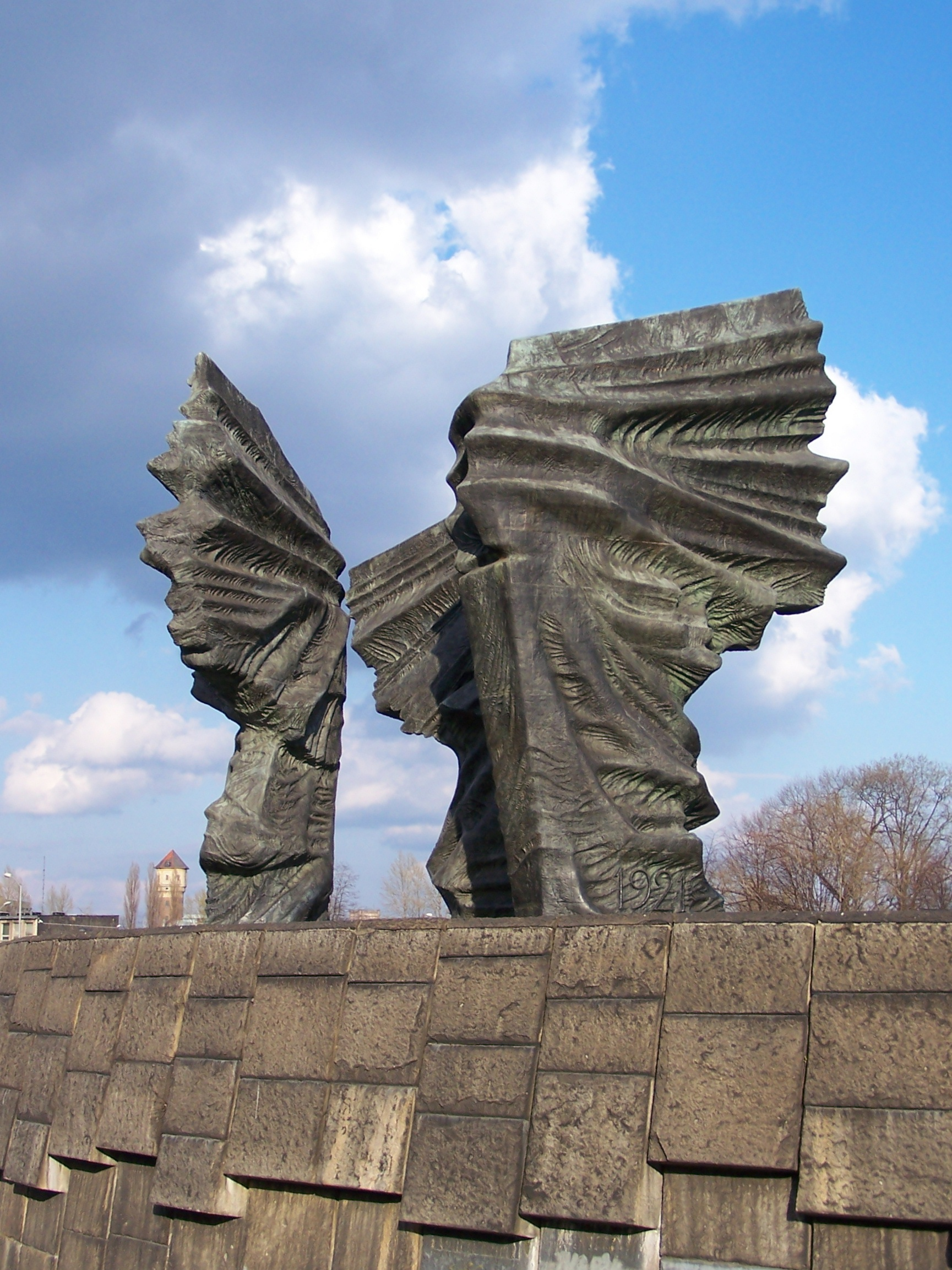
Silesian Insurgents Monument in Katowice. The largest and heaviest monument in Poland, constructed in 1967.

Arrangements between the Germans and Poles in Upper Silesia and appeals issued by both sides, as well as the dispatch of six battalions of Allied troops and the disbandment of the local guards, contributed markedly to the pacification of the district.

The Allied Supreme Council was, however, still unable to come to an agreement on the partition of the Upper Silesian territory on the lines of the plebiscite; the British and the French could only agree on one solution: turning the question over to the Council of the League of Nations.

The greatest excitement was caused all over Germany and in the German part of Upper Silesia by the intimation that the Council of the League of Nations had handed over the matter for closer investigation to a commission; this remained composed of four representatives, one each from Belgium, Brazil, Spain, and China. The commission collected its own data and issued a decision, stressing the principle of self-determination. On the basis of the reports of this commission and those of its experts, in October 1921, the council awarded the greater part of the Upper Silesian industrial district to Poland.

The Polish Government had decided to give Silesia considerable autonomy with the Silesian Parliament as a constituency and the Silesian Voivodeship Council as the executive body.

Poland obtained almost exactly half of the 1,950,000 inhabitants, viz., 965,000, but not quite a third of the territory, i.e., only 3,214 of 10,951 square kilometres (1,241 of 4,228 mi^{2}). This, however, constituted the more valuable portion by far of the district. Of 61 coal mines, 49.5 fell to Poland, the Prussian state losing 3 mines out of 4. Of a coal output of 31,750,000 tonnes, 24,600,000 tonnes fell to Poland. All iron mines with an output of 61,000 tonnes fell to Poland. Of 37 furnaces, 22 went to Poland, 15 to Germany. Of a pig-iron output of 570,000 tonnes, 170,000 tonnes remained German, and 400,000 tonnes became Polish. Of 16 zinc and lead mines, which produced 233,000 tons in 1920, only 4, with an output of 44,000 tonnes, remained German. The main towns of Königshütte (Chorzów), Kattowitz (Katowice), and Tarnowitz (Tarnowskie Góry) were given to Poland. In the Silesian territory that Poland regained, the Germans were a significant minority. Similarly, a significant minority of Poles (about half a million Poles) was still left on the German side, most of them in Oppeln (Opole).

In order to mitigate the hardships likely to arise from the partition of a district that was essentially an economic unit, it was decided, on the recommendation of the Council of the League of Nations, that German and Polish delegates, under a chairman appointed by the Council of the League, should draw up economic regulations as well as a statute for the protection of minorities, which were to have a duration of fifteen years. Special measures were threatened in the event that either of the two states should refuse to participate in the drawing up of such regulations, or to accept them subsequently.

In May 1922, the League of Nations issued the German-Polish Accord on East Silesia, also known as the Geneva Accord, intended to preserve the economic unity of the area and to guarantee minority rights. The League also set up a tribunal to arbitrate disputes. Furthermore, in response to a German complaint about the importance of Silesian coal for the German industry, Germany was given the right to import 500,000 tons per year at discounted prices. In 1925, three years following the development of the agreement and approaching the termination of the coal agreement, Germany refused to import the appropriate quantities of coal, attempting to use the coal issue as a lever against Poland, trying to impose a revision of the whole Polish-German frontier. Polish-German relations worsened, as Germany also began a tariff war with Poland, but the Polish government would not yield on the border issue.

In 1921, Adolf Hitler, who was the best known member of the Munich-based National Socialist German Workers' Party, but not its leader, came into conflict with the party's founder and leader, Anton Drexler. In July 1921, the dispute was resolved with Hitler seizing control of the party and deposing Drexler as a party leader. At the meeting in Munich that decided in favor of Hitler, it was the veterans of the Upper Silesia campaign newly returned to Bavaria, described by one contemporary as the "Upper Silesian adventurers, flashing medals, badges and swastikas", who provided the decisive votes which enabled the triumph of Hitler over Drexler. A number of the Freikorps veterans of the Upper Silesia war, such as Fritz Schmedes, went on to serve in the Nazi Party. Schmedes, who played a leading role as a Freikorps officer in the "vicious fighting" in Upper Silesia in 1921, became a SS-Brigadeführer in World War Two who committed one of the worst massacres ever in Greek history when his men massacred the entire village of Distomo on 10 June 1944.

Under the Sanation regime, Michał Grażyński was appointed as the voivode of Polish Upper Silesia in 1926. Grażyński was involved in a lengthy feud with Korfanty and went out of his way to downplay and minimize Korfanty's role in the uprisings. By contrast, Grażyński vastly inflated his own role in the third uprising, as he was only the chief of staff of one of the uprising's army groups. During his time in office, which lasted until 1939, Grażyński held rallies to honor the anniversary of the uprising of 1921 every 3 May, as his regime was based on the support of "Związek Powstańców Śląskich" (Association of Silesian Insurgents). Grażyński's rallies were largely boycotted by Korfanty and his supporters.

In September 1939, Polish Upper Silesia was annexed to Germany, and during the German occupation, there was a violent policy of Germanizing the "recovered lands". During the German occupation, Polish veterans of the Upper Silesia uprisings were hunted down and killed as enemies of the Reich. For this reason alone, the Polish veterans tended to be overrepresented in the Polish resistance. In 1945, all of Upper Silesia was annexed to Poland. During the Communist era, the government in Warsaw took an ultra-nationalist line to rebut the charge that it was under Soviet domination, and placed great emphasis on the "recovered western territories" as the centerpiece of its claim for legitimacy. Władysław Gomułka gave a speech at Góra Świętej Anny on 1 May 1946 to honor the Poles killed fighting in the battle in 1921 and presented a line of continuity between the uprising of 1921 and his government. This was especially the case during the period when Gomułka was in power between 1956-1970, as he restored the tradition of celebrating the anniversary of the third uprising every 3 May and often took part in the celebrations.

The last veteran of the Silesian Uprisings, Wilhelm Meisel, died in 2009 at the age of 105. In 2021, a dispute emerged over plans to put up a monument in Opole honoring those who fought for Poland. The Social-Cultural Society of Germans in Opole Silesia, representing the last of the volksdeutsche (ethnic German) minority in Silesia, called for a monument to honor both sides. The mayor of Opole stated he wanted to "commemorate the heroes of the Silesian uprising who fought for Poland and not those who shot at them."

== See also ==
- Silesian Eagle

== Bibliography ==
- Henryk Zieliński, Rola powstania wielkopolskiego oraz powstań śląskich w walce o zjednoczenie ziem zachodnich z Polską (1918–1921), w: Droga przez Półwiecze.
- Rohan Butler, MA, J.P.T. Bury, MA, and M.E. Lambert (ed.), MA, Documents on British Foreign Policy 1919–1939, 1st Series, volume XI, Upper Silesia, Poland, and the Baltic States, January 1920 – March 1921, Her Majesty's Stationery Office (HMSO), London, 1961 (amended edition 1974), ISBN 0-11-591511-7
- W. N. Medlicott, MA, D.Lit., Douglas Dakin, MA, PhD, and M.E. Lambert, MA (ed.), Documents on British Foreign Policy 1919–1939, 1st Series, volume XVI, Upper Silesia, March 1921 – November 1922 HMSO, London, 1968.
- Dziewanowski, M. K., Poland in the 20th century, New York: Columbia University Press, 1977.
- Hughes, Rupert (12 October 1919). "Germany's Silesian Plot: Colonizing Scheme to Overcome Polish Majority in a Region Which Contains Vast Resources for Future War-Making". The New York Times.
- Mazower, Mark (1993). Inside Hitler's Greece The Experience of Occupation, 1941–1944. New Haven: Yale University Press. ISBN 0-300-08923-6.
- Piekałkiewicz, Jarosław (2019). Dance with Death: A Holistic View of Saving Polish Jews During the Holocaust. Falls Village: Hamilton Books. ISBN 978-0-7618-7167-5.
- Polak-Springer, Peter (2015). Recovered Territory A German-Polish Conflict Over Land and Culture, 1919–1989. London: Berghahn Books. ISBN 978-1-78238-888-3.
- Schoenbaum, David (1966). Hitler's Social Revolution Class and Status in Nazi Germany, 1933–1939. London: Weidenfeld & Nicolson. ISBN 978-0-307-82233-8.
- Wilson, Tim (2010). Frontiers of Violence Conflict and Identity in Ulster and Upper Silesia 1918–1922. Oxford: Oxford University Press. ISBN 978-0-19-958371-3.
