= Cisowa, Kędzierzyn-Koźle =

District of Kędzierzyn-Koźle, Poland

Cisowa
- District of Kędzierzyn-Koźle
- Location within Poland
- Coordinates: 50°22′50″N 18°14′36″E
- Country: Poland
- Voivodeship: Opole
- County/City: Kędzierzyn-Koźle
- Within city limits: 1975
- Time zone: UTC+1 (CET)
  - Summer (DST): UTC+2 (CEST)
- Postal code: 47-230
- Vehicle registration: OK

Cisowa [t͡ɕiˈsɔva] is a district of Kędzierzyn-Koźle, Poland, located in the northern part of the city.

The name of the district is of Polish origin and comes from the word cis, which means "yew".

During the Third Silesian Uprising, on May 8, 1921, Polish insurgents captured Cisowa from the Germans without a fight.
