= Ewa Komander =

Polish triathlete

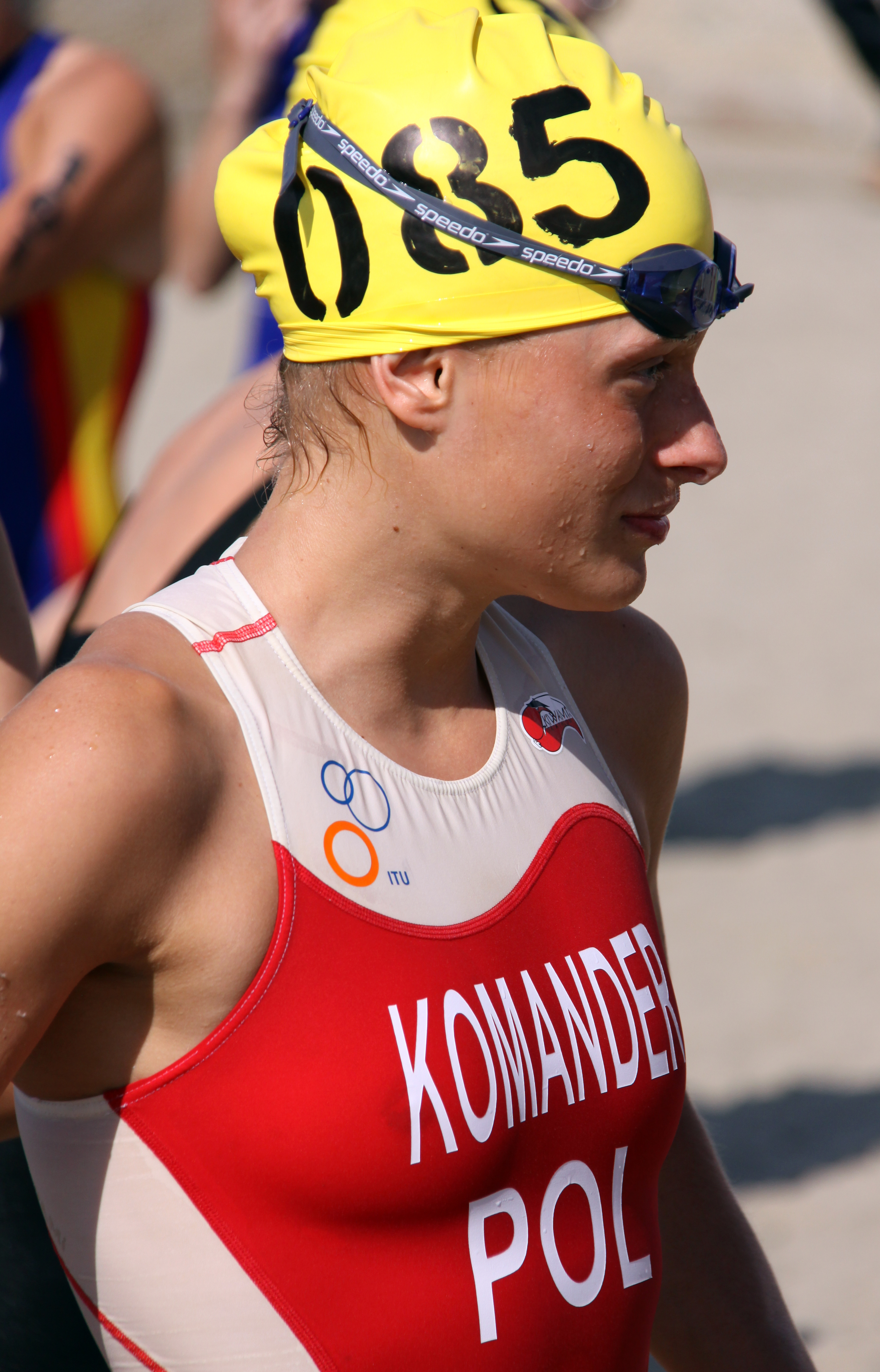
Ewa Komander immediately before the start in Alanya, 2010.

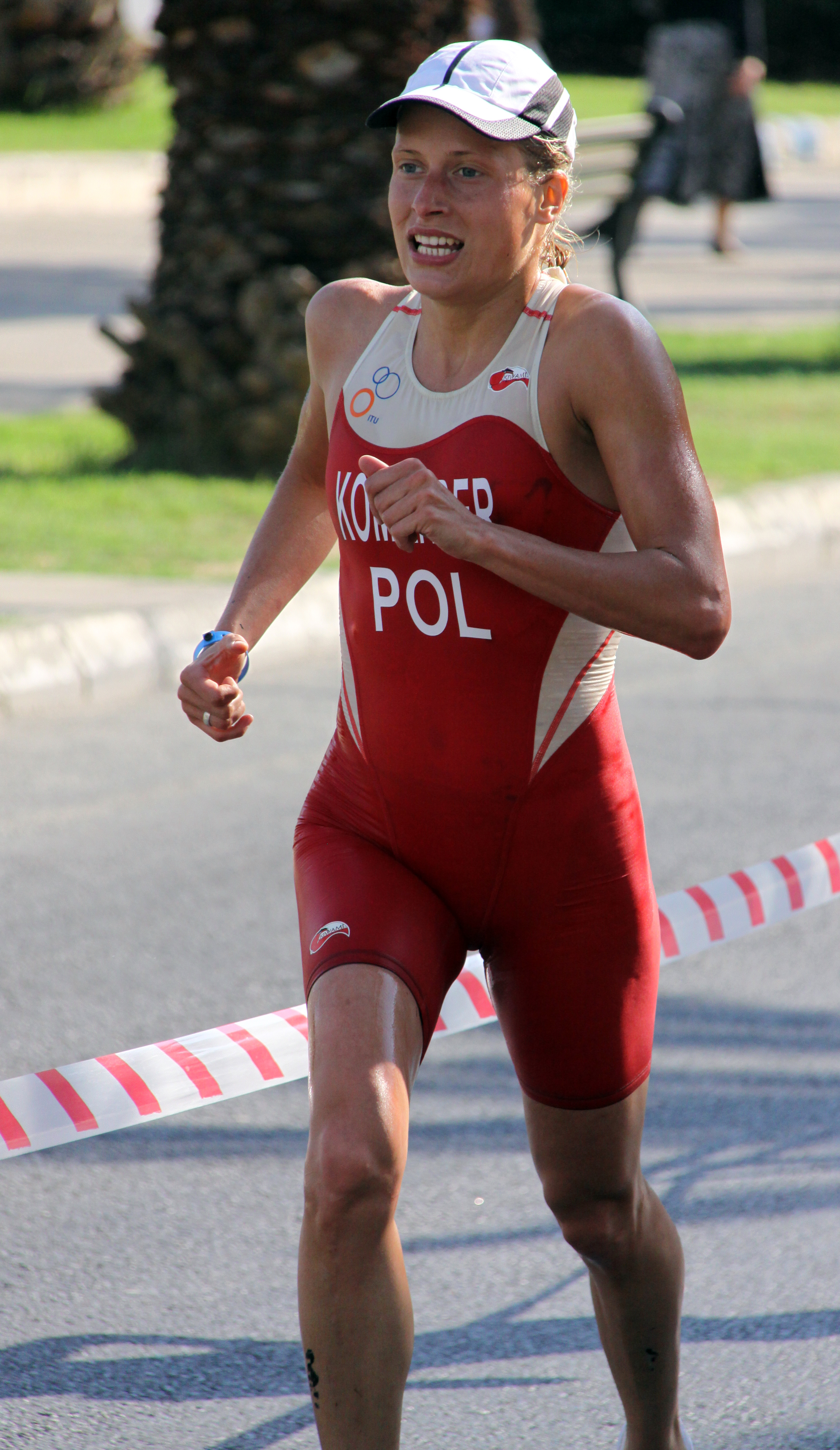
Ewa Komander at the Premium European Cup triathlon in Alanya, 2010.

Ewa Komander (born 24 February 1985) is a Polish professional triathlete, Polish U23 Champion of the year 2007 and Elite silver medalist of the year 2008.

Ewa Komander was born in Kędzierzyn-Koźle and moved to Poznań and represented the club Olimpia Poznań until December 2010. In 2011 it was announced that she would represent Stadtwerke Team Witten in the German triathlon circuit Bundesliga.

== ITU Competitions ==
In the eight years from 2003 to 2010, Komander took part in 19 ITU triathlons and achieved 6 top ten positions, among which a European Cup gold medal in 2010 (Karlovy Vary) and a European Cup silver medal in 2009 (Varna). The following list is based upon the official ITU rankings and the ITU Athlete's Profile Page. Unless indicated otherwise, the following events are Olympic Distance Triathlons and refer to the Elite category.

Date	Competition	Place	Rank
2003-06-21	European Championships (Junior)	Karlovy Vary	34
2007-08-30	BG World Championships (U23)	Hamburg	30
2007-09-09	Premium European Cup	Kędzierzyn-Koźle	DNS
2008-06-21	European Cup	Schliersee	11
2008-07-27	Premium European Cup	Poznań	12
2008-09-06	European Championships (U23)	Pulpí	9
2009-05-17	Premium European Cup	Pontevedra	21
2009-07-02	European Championships	Holten	34
2009-07-25	European Cup and Balkan Championships	Varna	3
2009-08-30	Premium European Cup	Kędzierzyn-Koźle	13
2009-09-26	European Cup	Mar Menor	9
2010-04-17	European Cup	Antalya	6
2010-07-03	European Championships	Athlone	DNF
2010-07-10	World Cup	Holten	33
2010-07-24	Dextro Energy World Championship Series	London	DNF
2010-08-08	World Cup	Tiszaújváros	26
2010-08-22	European Cup	Karlovy Vary	1
2010-08-29	Premium European Cup	Almere	5
2010-10-10	World Cup	Huatulco	12
2010-10-24	Premium European Cup	Alanya	12
2011-03-26	World Cup	Mooloolaba	DNF
2011-04-17	World Cup	Ishigaki	27
2011-05-08	World Cup	Monterrey	DNF
2011-05-29	Premium European Cup	Brasschaat	22

BG = the sponsor British Gas · DNS = did not start · DNF = did not finish
