= Heinrich Tischler =

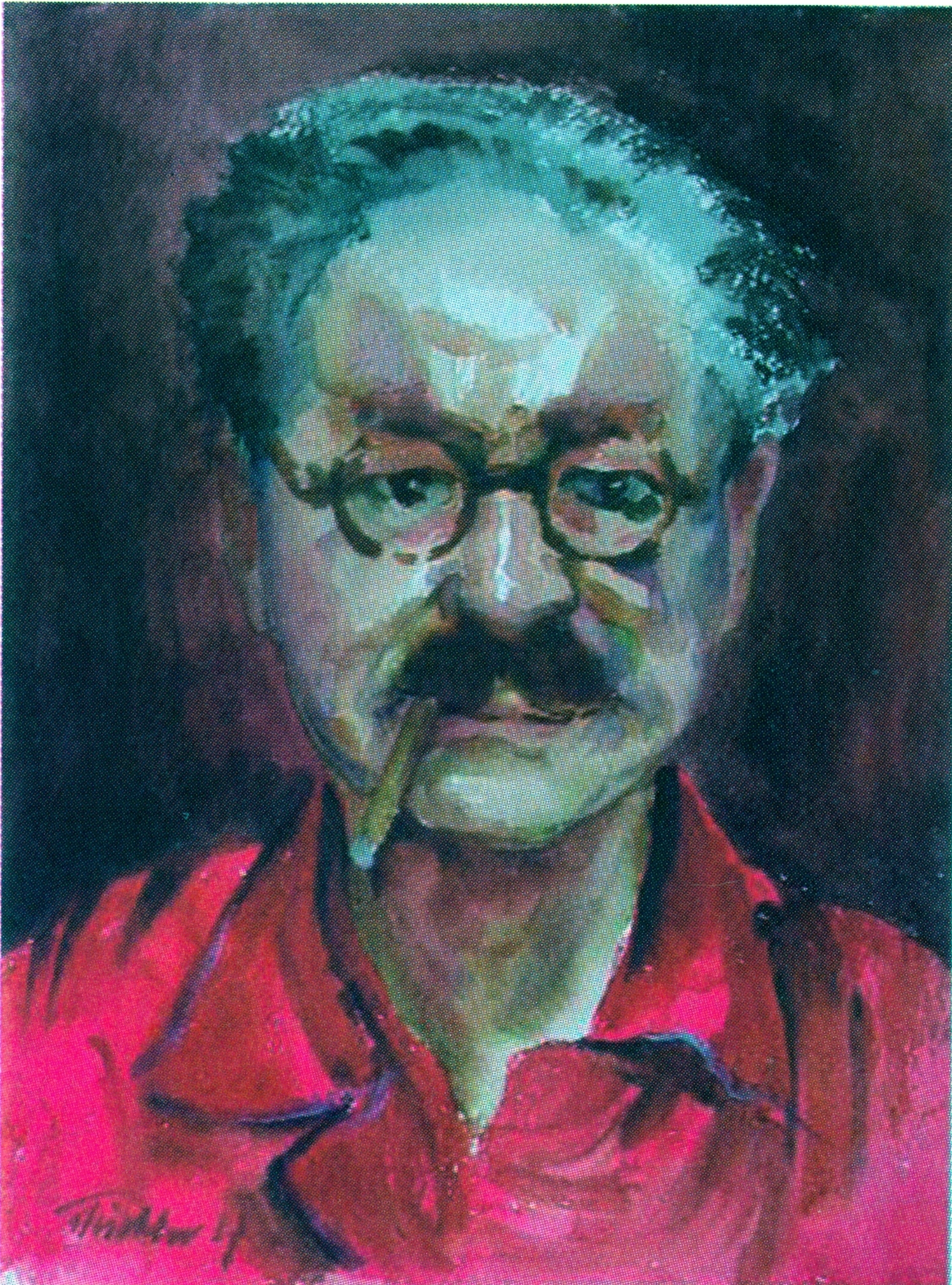
Self portrait

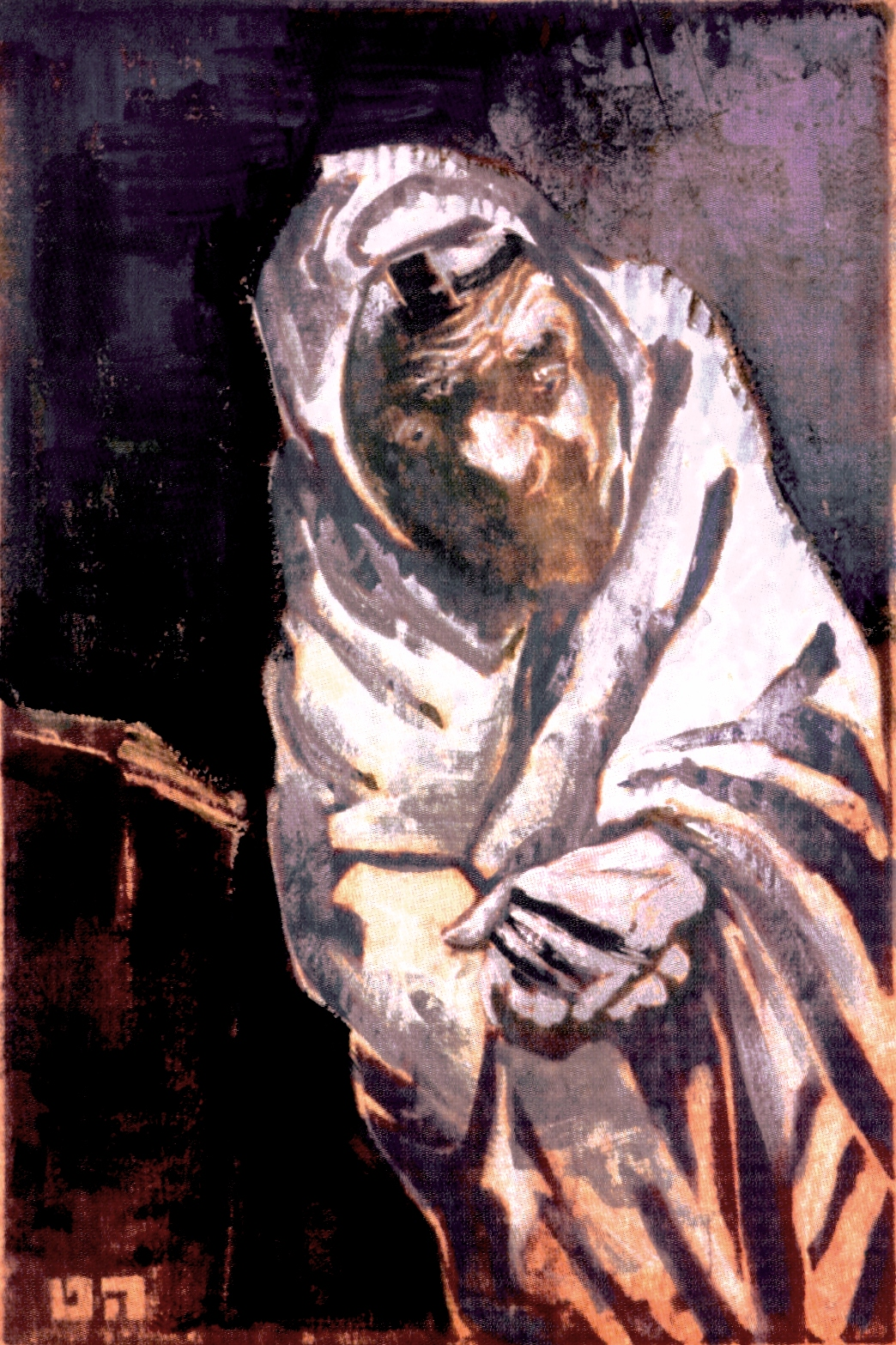
Betender

Heinrich Tischler (25 May 1892 – 16 December 1938) was a German Jewish painter, architect and graphic artist.

== Life and work ==
Tischler was born on 25 May 1892 in Cosel, Silesia (now Kędzierzyn-Koźle, Poland). He grew up in Wrocław (that time called Breslau) from 1897. After finishing grammar school, he trained as a carpenter and then worked in the building trade. From 1912, he attended the architecture and painting classes at the State Academy of Arts and Crafts in Wrocław. Tischler was friends with Otto Mueller, who had been a professor at the academy since 1919.

He experienced the First World War as a soldier. After the war, he worked as a freelance painter and architect in Wrocław and the surrounding area. From 1927 to 1928, he designed the interior of the Petersdorff department store in Wrocław and the conversion of the Gurassa commercial building in Opole. Tischler painted, drew and produced etchings and lithographs. The main themes of his work were the bleak social conditions of the post-war period, using the stylistic devices of Expressionism.

In 1925, he opened a painting school in Wrocław together with Isidor Ascheim. From 1930 Tischler was a member of the Deutscher Werkbund. In 1931, he was able to show his work for the last time at an individual exhibition in Wrocław.

== Nazi persecution ==
When the Nazis came to power in Germany in 1933, Tischler's artistic and professional career came to an abrupt end due to persecution under anti-Jewish laws. Ismar Littmann, a Jewish collector who was Tischler's friend and protector, committed suicide. Tischler's work reflected the feeling of "estrangement and exclusion" due to the "regular persecution of Jews". He completed his last building commission in 1936, after which he secured his livelihood as a drawing teacher. After work bans, interrogations and other harassment, he was sent to Buchenwald concentration camp in 1938. Following efforts by his family, he was released a month later. However, he died shortly afterwards as a result of injuries sustained during his imprisonment and exhaustion. He was buried in the New Jewish Cemetery on Lotnicza Street.

Tischler's widow Else, who was able to save some of his paintings, managed to flee to Great Britain. The estate came into the possession of the Kassel art collector Hans Peter Reisse, who sold it to the Silesian Museum in Görlitz along with other works by artists who belonged to the circle of the Wrocław Academy.

== Work ==
=== Paintings and drawing ===
- Vorortstraße in Breslau (ohne Titel), Öl auf Leinwand, um 1920, Schlesisches Museum Görlitz
- Gebete (Mappenwerk mit fünf Lithografien und Deckblatt, erschienen bei Fritz Gurlitt, Berlin), 1920
- Christus und Magdalena, 1920
- Verzweifelte Propheten, Aquarell, 1926, Exil-Sammlung Memoria
- Stillleben mit Selbstbildnis im Spiegel, Gouache, Privatbesitz

=== Book illustrations ===
- Jechak Mair Blaustein: Der Ostjude. Ein Spiel vom Leiden. Verlag von M. W. Kaufmann, Leipzig, 1920

== Posthumous exhibitions ==
- 1971: Gütersloh, Zimmergalerie
- 1974: Berlin, Galerie Geitel
- 2016: Wrocław, Museum der Stadt im Königsschloss ("Die verfolgte Kunst. Heinrich Tischler und sein Umfeld in Wrocław")

== See also ==
- Degenerate art
- The Holocaust

== Literature ==
- Carla Heussler: Heinrich Tischler, in: Allgemeines Künstlerlexikon, Onlineversion
- Myra Warhaftig: Die Gebrüder Hadda und Heinrich Tischler. Drei Architekten aus Breslau. In: Deutsches Architektenblatt, Jahrgang 1999, Heft 1, S. 28–29.
- Thomas B. Schumann (Hrsg.): Deutsche Künstler im Exil 1933-1945. Werke aus der Sammlung Memoria Thomas B. Schumann, Hürth: Edition Memoria 2016, S. 153f., ISBN 9783930353354.
- Tischler, Heinrich, in: Joseph Walk (Hrsg.): Kurzbiographien zur Geschichte der Juden 1918–1945. München : Saur, 1988, ISBN 3-598-10477-4, S. 366
