= Sławięcice =

District of Kędzierzyn-Koźle, Poland

- District of Kędzierzyn-Koźle
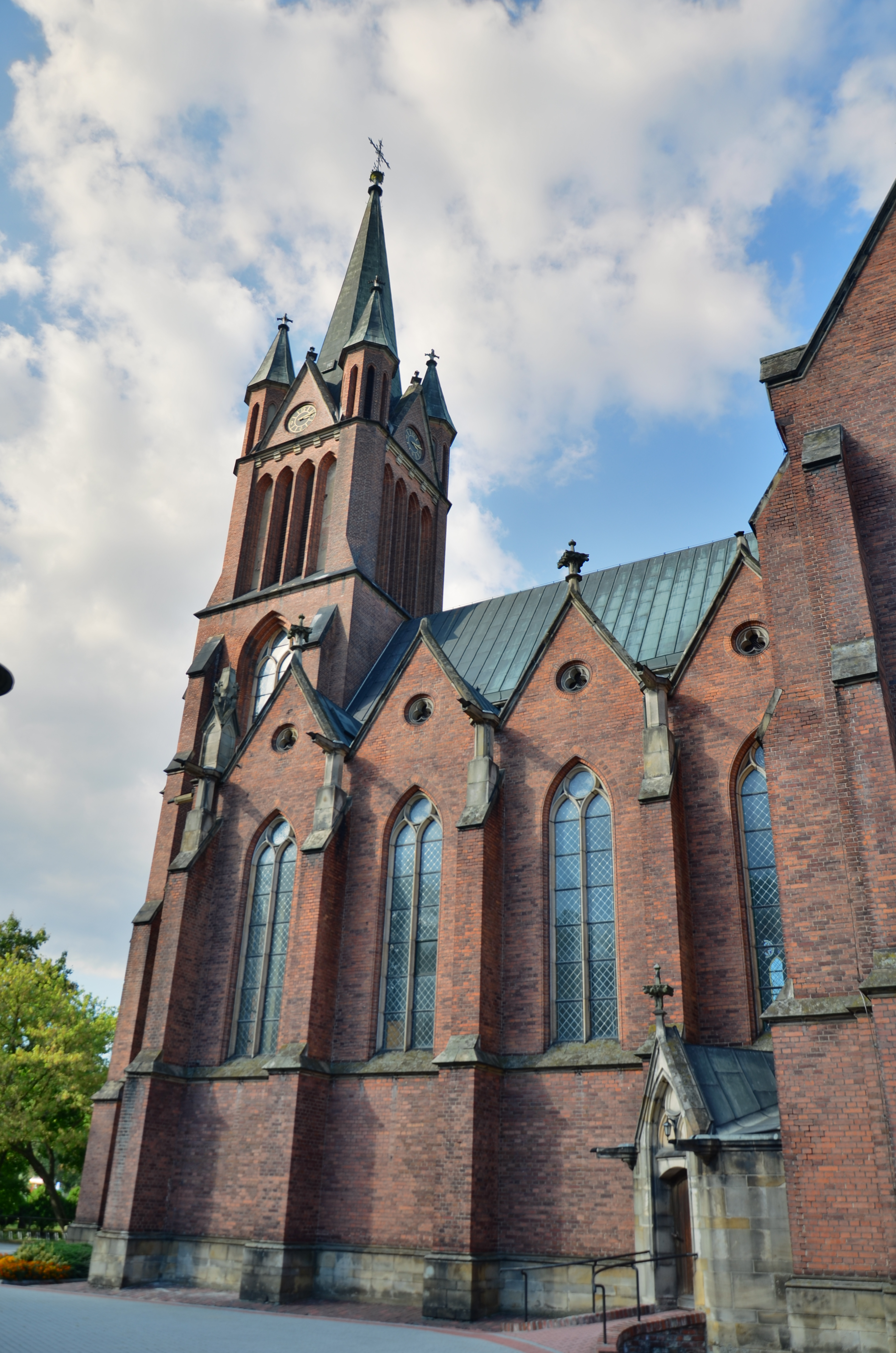
- Saint Catherine church

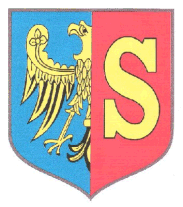
- Coat of arms

- Location within Poland
- Coordinates: 50°22′26″N 18°19′27″E
- Country: Poland
- Voivodeship: Opole
- County/City: Kędzierzyn-Koźle
- Within city limits: 1975
- Time zone: UTC+1 (CET)
  - Summer (DST): UTC+2 (CEST)
- Postal code: 47-230
- Vehicle registration: OK

Sławięcice [swavjɛnˈt͡ɕit͡sɛ] is a district of Kędzierzyn-Koźle, Opole Voivodeship, Poland, located in the eastern part of the city.

== History ==
The area became part of the emerging Polish state in the 10th century. Sławięcice was first mentioned in 1245. It was granted town rights before 1260, which however, were transferred by Duke Władysław Opolski to nearby Ujazd. The name of the district is of Polish origin and comes from the old Polish male name Sławota.

The village was annexed by Prussia in 1742, and from 1871 it was also part of the German Empire. During the Third Silesian Uprising, on May 4, 1921, Polish insurgents captured Sławięcice from the Germans. Sławięcice was an essential logistical hub for the insurgents for a month. The Poles organized a field hospital and the insurgents' headquarters was located at the local palace.

During World War II, the German government operated a forced labour "education" camp, the E6 and E207 forced labour subcamps of the Stalag VIII-B/344 prisoner of war camp for Allied POWs, and a subcamp of the Auschwitz concentration camp. In Sławięcice, there was also a crematorium for the victims of the camps, which is now a memorial.

Sławięcice was included within the city limits of Kędzierzyn-Koźle as its district in 1975.
