= Sławięcice Palace =

Historic palace in Upper Silesia, Poland

Coordinates: 50°22′33″N 18°19′08″E

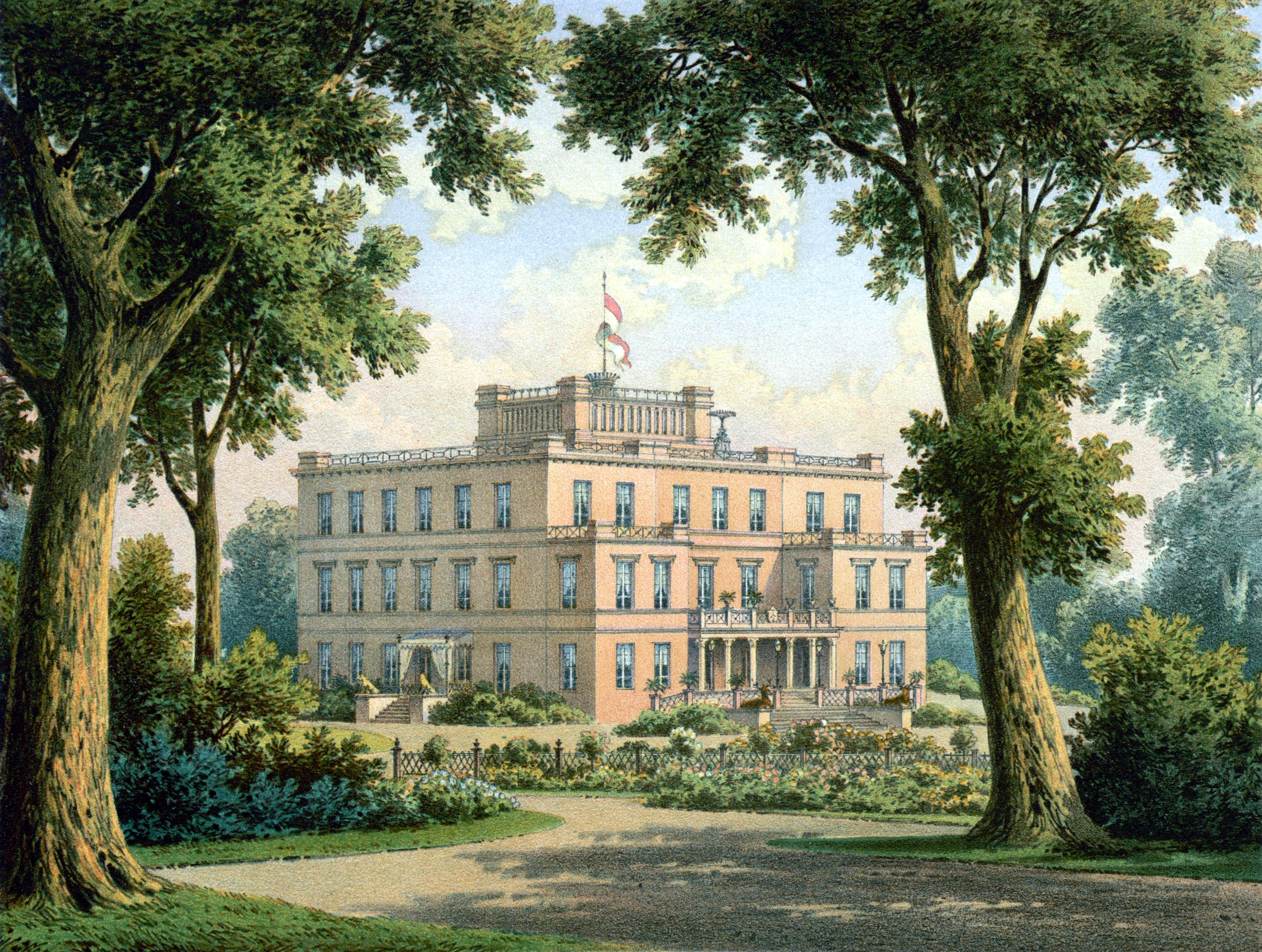
Schloss Slawentzitz around 1860, by Alexander Duncker

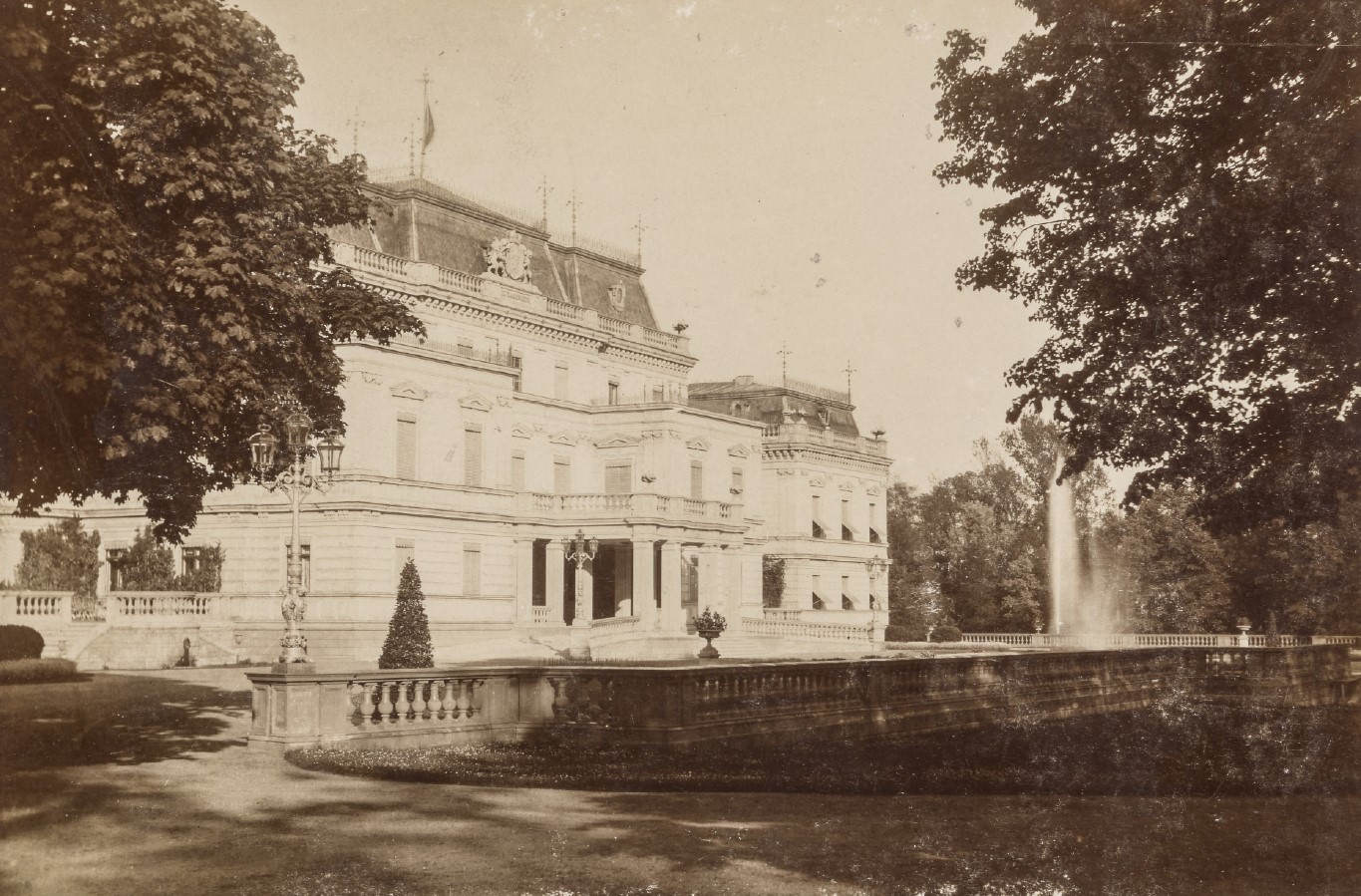
Schloss Slawentzitz at the start of the 20th century

Sławięcice Palace (Polish: Pałac Sławięcice, German: Schloss Slawentzitz) was a former stately home in Sławięcice, today a district of Kędzierzyn-Koźle in the Opole Voivodeship of southern Poland. The site originated as a Piast stronghold mentioned in the fourteenth century and later became the centre of a large estate. In the early eighteenth century a baroque palace with formal gardens was erected for the von Hoym family. After its destruction, the estate passed by marriage to the Princes von Hohenlohe-Ingelfingen, who in 1836 built a new residence in a late-classical style with elements of the Italian Baroque.

The new palace, enlarged in 1861 by Prince Hugo zu Hohenlohe-Öhringen, was one of the most imposing noble seats in Upper Silesia. It stood within an extensive landscape park containing pavilions, an orangery, fountains, and a mausoleum. Owing to its scale and architectural refinement, contemporaries referred to it as the “Silesian Versailles.”

Until 1945, the property remained in Hohenlohe possession and served as a residence connected with their industrial enterprises in Silesia. The building was heavily damaged during the final months of the Second World War, subsequently plundered, and finally demolished in the 1970s. Of the palace itself only fragments of the portico survive, together with the historic park, which is protected as a cultural monument.

== History ==
=== Origins and the Medieval castle ===
The origins of the Sławięcice estate date to the late Middle Ages, when a fortified seat belonging to the Dukes of Opole stood on the Kłodnica River. By the fifteenth century a brick castle had been built on the site, serving both as a residence and as a local administrative centre of the duchy. After the extinction of the Opole Piasts the property passed to the Bohemian Crown, under which it remained for more than a century.

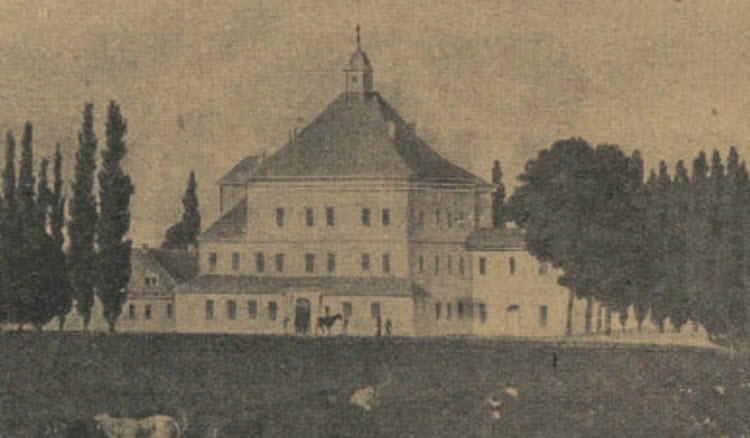
The first Slawiecice castle

In 1600, Emperor Rudolf II sold Sławięcice to Bohussin von Zwolle und Güldenstein, a nobleman of Dutch origin who held several estates in Silesia. Ownership then passed to the Barons von Sießwohl, and in 1678 to Countess Henkel, followed by her sons Counts Carl Maximilian and Leo Ferdinand Henkel During this period the medieval castle was adapted to a baroque manor form, with domestic wings and a small park.

=== Flemming and Hoym families ===
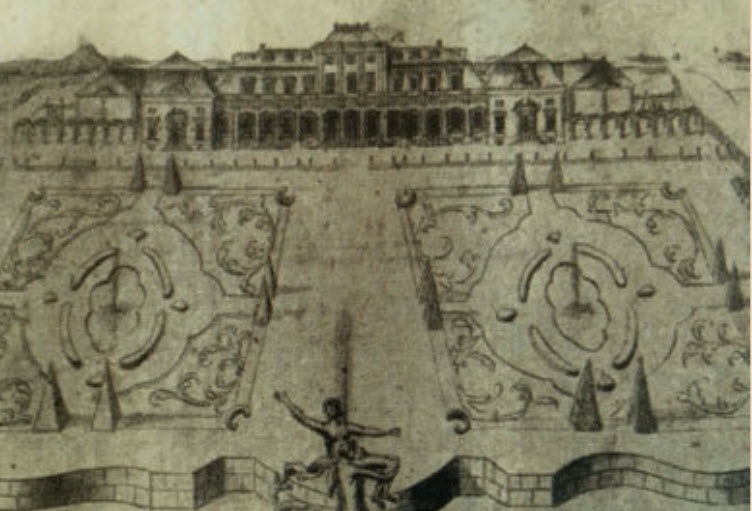
The Sławięcice Palace constructed by Hoym

In 1702 the heirs of the Henkel family sold the property to Count Jacob Heinrich von Flemming (1667–1728), Saxon General and minister under Augustus II the Strong. Flemming initiated significant industrial development, erecting iron smelters and forges in Sławięcice and neighbouring villages such as Blachownia and Kotlarnia. These were among the most modern metallurgical works in Upper Silesia and laid the foundations for the region’s later industrial importance.

Flemming retained the estate for only a decade. In 1714 he exchanged it with Adolph Magnus von Hoym (1668–1723), a Saxon statesman and art collector. Between 1716 and 1720 Hoym constructed a new baroque garden palace on the opposite bank of the Kłodnica River, inspired by Versailles and by contemporary Dutch-French formalism. The complex comprised the palace, an orangery, aviary, rose garden, and kitchen gardens, arranged along a strict central axis. Although this first palace was destroyed by fire a few decades later, its gardens established the formal structure later reused in the nineteenth-century park.

=== Hohenlohe-Öhringen family ===
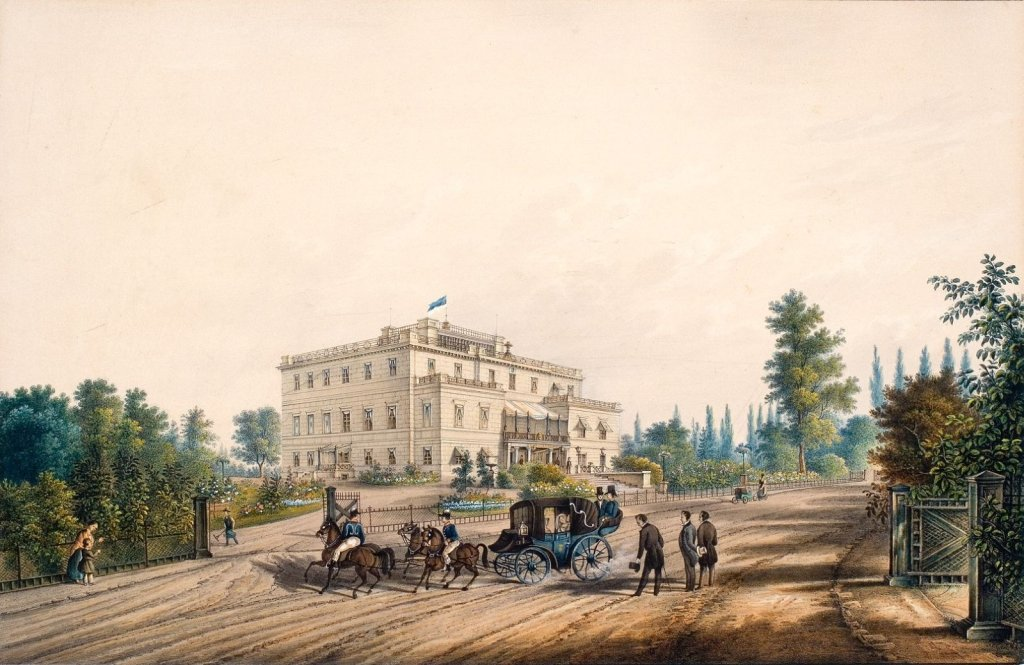
Sławięcice Palace in the 19th century

In 1782, through the marriage of Countess Amalie von Hoym to prince Frederick Louis of Hohenlohe-Ingelfingen (1746–1818), the Hoym estates in Oppurg, Thuringia, and Sławięcice passed to the Hohenlohe family. Frederick Louis served as a Prussian general, gaining distinction in the Napoleonic Wars until his defeat at Battle of Jena against [Napoleon] in 1806. Disgraced, he retired to Sławięcice, where he created an English landscape garden and built a cast-iron family mausoleum. He died there in 1818, and his tomb with the Hohenlohe motto Ex flore fructus remains a notable feature of the park.

His son Prince August of Hohenlohe-Öhringen (1784–1853) rebuilt the residence after the old castle was struck by lightning and burned down in 1827. The new palace, completed around 1830, formed the nucleus of the later Schloss Slawentzitz. The Hohenlohe family, already major industrialists, turned Sławięcice into the administrative and residential centre of their Upper-Silesian enterprises, which included large-scale zinc smelting works, at the time among the largest in the world. The family belonged to the richest citizens of Germany.

=== The “Silesian Versailles” ===
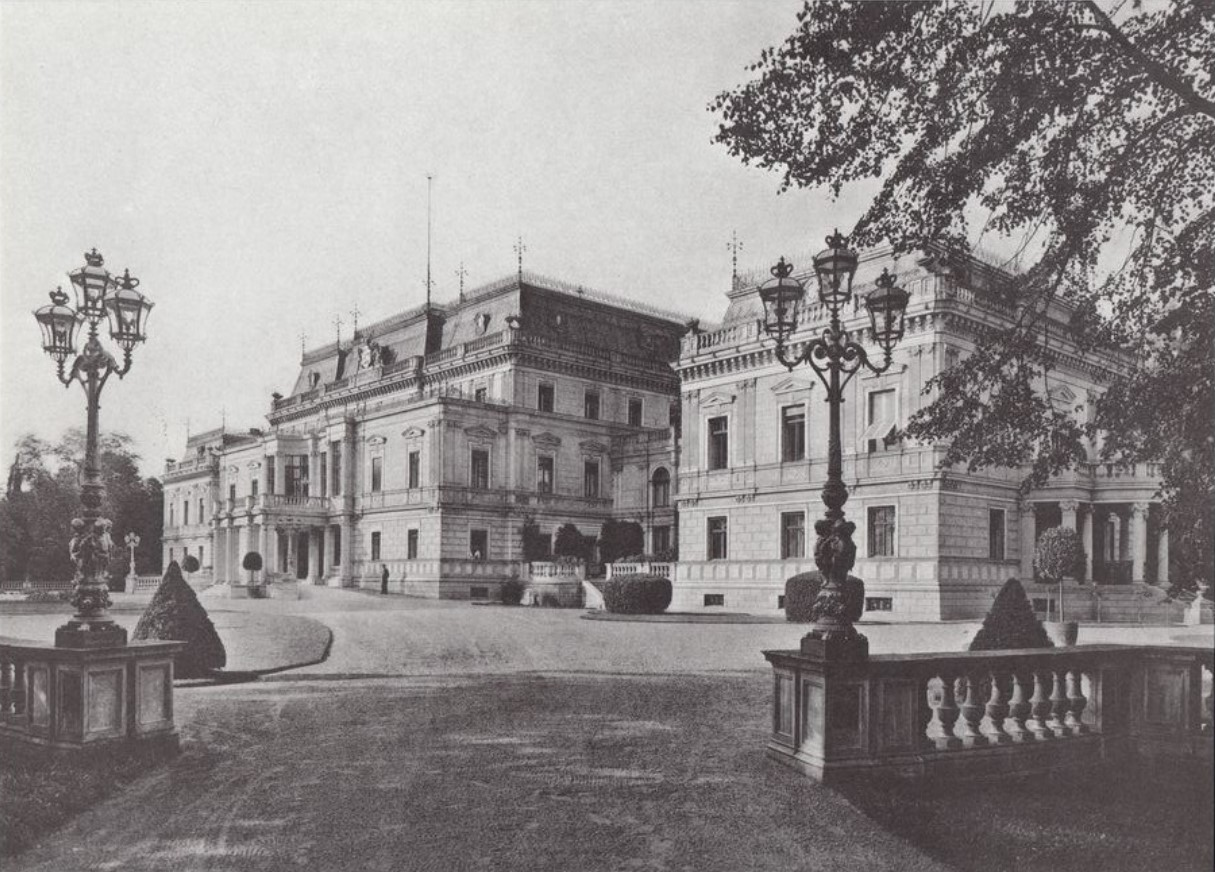
Early-20th-century view of the palace

In 1861, August’s son Prince Hugo zu Hohenlohe-Öhringen (1816–1897) was created Duke of Ujest (German: Herzog von Ujest) at the coronation of William I as King of Prussia. He expanded the palace between 1867 and 1868, adding new wings and service courts, and made the estate a showpiece of the industrial nobility’s culture. The complex became known as the Silesian Versailles.

After the Duke’s death in 1897, the estate was inherited by Prince Christian Kraft von Hohenlohe-Öhringen (1848–1926). Under his ownership the palace reached its greatest prestige: imperial hunts and receptions were held there, and Emperor William II as well as Tsar Nicholas II of Russia were received as guests. The last owner was Prince Johann (“Hans”) von Hohenlohe-Öhringen (1858–1945).

=== The Interbellum ===
The splendour did not last. Although the front lines of the First World War never reached Upper Silesia, the region’s political turbulence did. In May 1921, during the Third Silesian Uprising, insurgent Polish forces captured Sławięcice and installed their headquarters within the abandoned palace for nearly a month. The Hohenlohe family eventually regained possession, but the estate never recovered its former prestige.

During the interwar years the family continued to reside there, though the costs of upkeep were enormous.

=== War and Decline ===
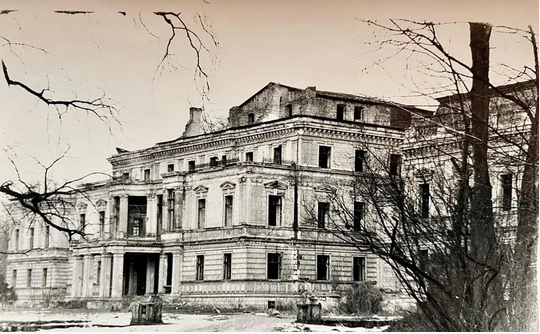
Ruins in the 1950s - The palace could still have been restored

During the late 1930s the Sławięcice Palace was requisitioned by German military and police authorities. Several post-war accounts and local testimonies suggest that elements of the planning and coordination of the Gleiwitz incident—the staged attack of 31 August 1939 by Nazi Germany on the German radio station in Gleiwitz (Polish: Gliwice) (then Germany and now Gliwice, Poland) —were prepared from offices established within the palace complex.

The Gleiwitz incident, carried out by members of the SS under Alfred Naujocks, was part of a wider series of false-flag operations intended to provide a casus belli for the invasion of Poland. While documentary confirmation of the Sławięcice site’s operational role is limited, its proximity to Gleiwitz and its earlier adaptation for security purposes make such use plausible. The episode illustrates how many Silesian estates were requisitioned by the Nazi regime for administrative and intelligence functions on the eve of the Second World War.

During the Second World War the family fled to their summer palace at Oppurg in Thuringia, and later to Neuenstein in Württemberg. Since then, Schloss Neuenstein has remained the main residence of the princes up to this day.

In January 1945, during the advance of the Red Army, the palace and its park were heavily damaged in fighting. Although the main structure initially survived, it was soon plundered and set on fire. Despite the extensive destruction, the masonry walls remained largely intact and the building could still have been restored. In the turbulent post-war years, however, the site was left neglected and only sporadically used. A further fire in 1948 destroyed the remaining roof and interiors. During the 1950s, the ruins were occasionally used for youth camps, but by the 1960s the structure had deteriorated beyond repair. The remnants were demolished in the 1970s, leaving only fragments of the entrance portico standing amid the former park.

=== Today ===
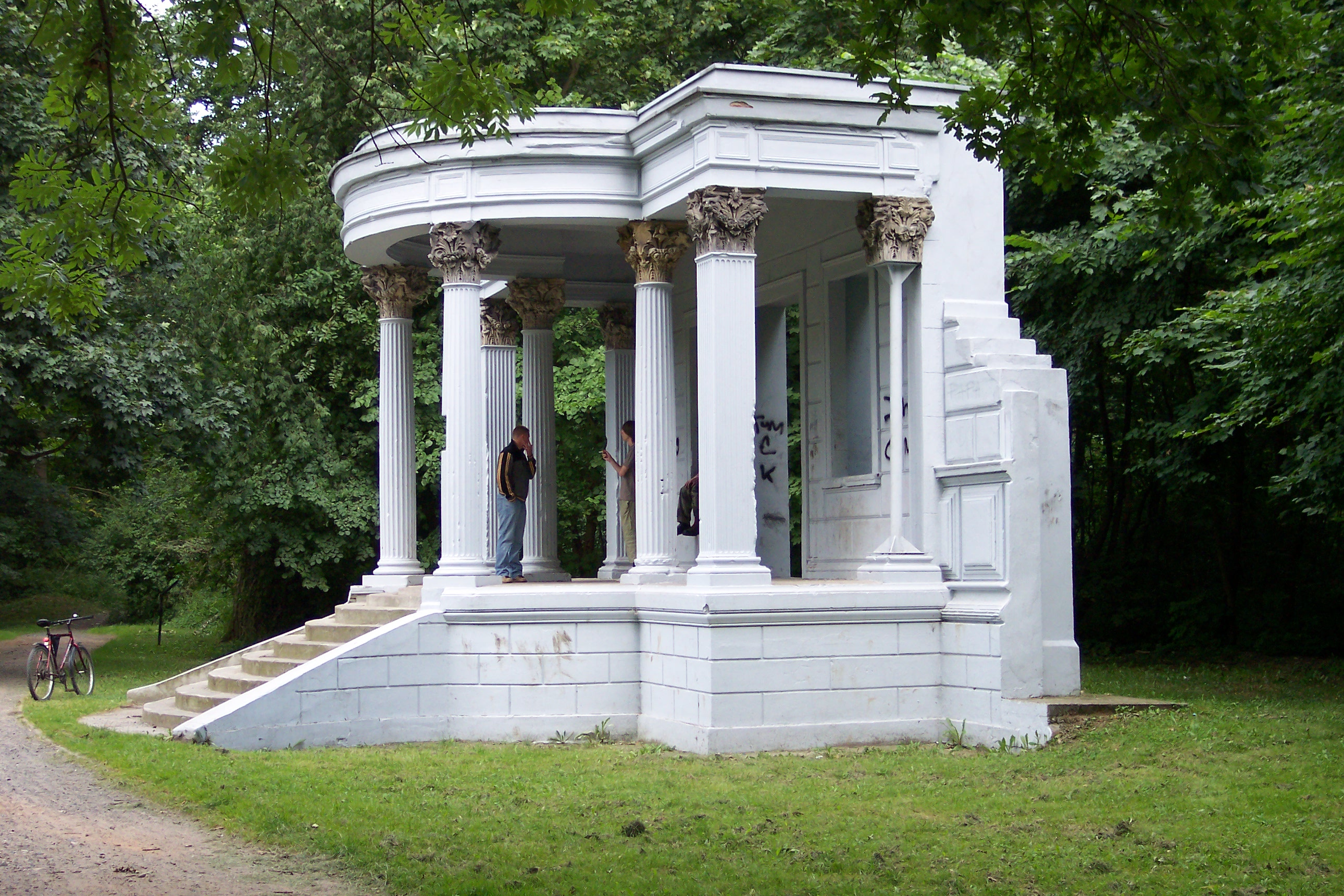
The remaining portico

The destruction of Sławięcice Palace erased one of the most magnificent monuments of Silesian aristocratic architecture. Only fragments survived: part of the southern entrance portico, a few stone steps, and scattered remnants of the garden architecture. The extensive landscape park, however, remains largely intact. Within it stand vestiges of earlier buildings such as the small baroque pavilion, the gardener’s house, and the romantic mausoleum. The park’s avenues and ponds still hint at the vanished grandeur of the Silesian Versailles.

== Architecture and Gardens ==
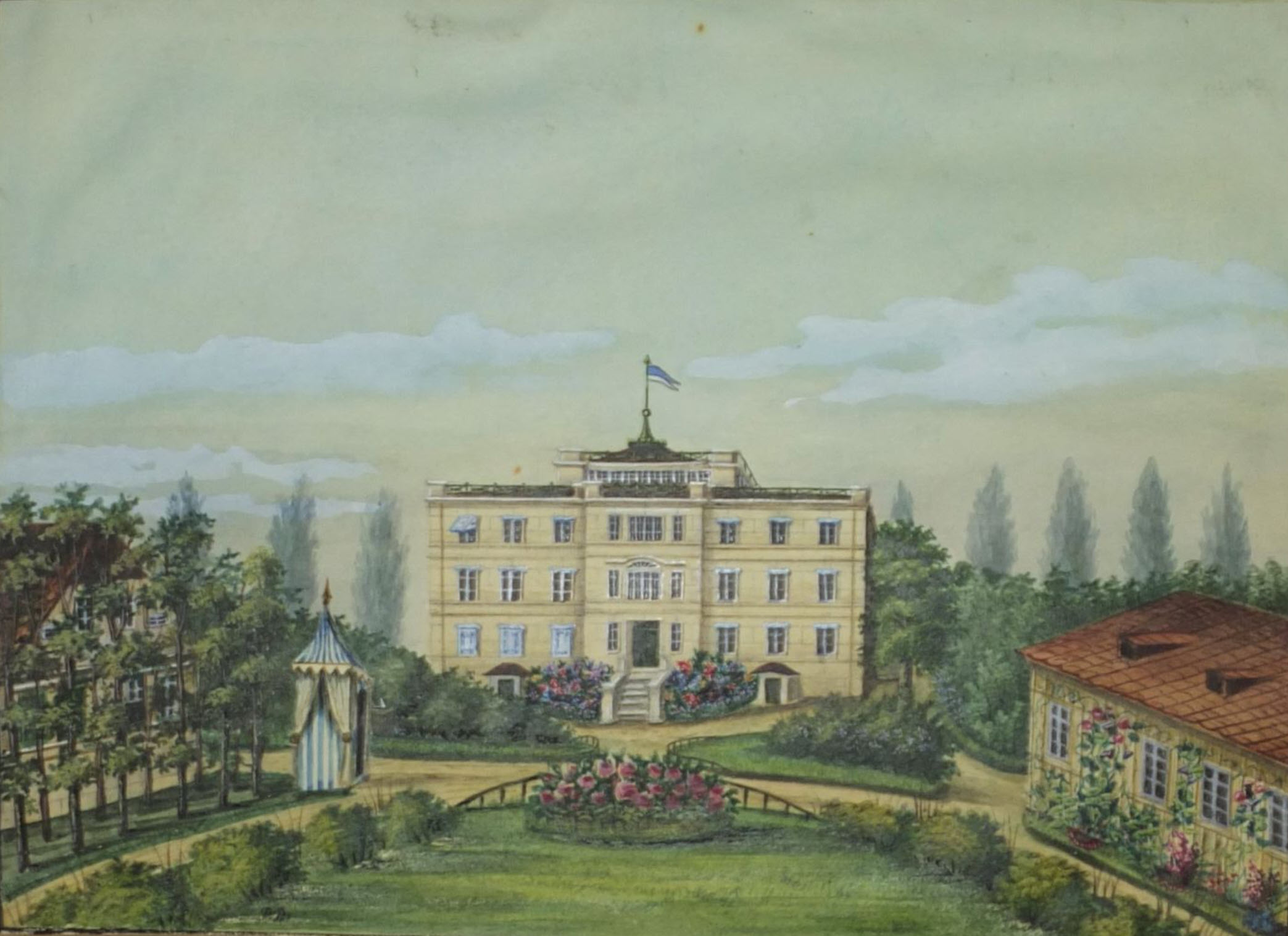
Sławięcice Palace in 1853

=== Medieval castle ===
The earliest known residence in Sławięcice was a fortified brick castle of medieval origin, constructed on a rectangular plan and surrounded by a broad moat. This early structure, belonging to the Dukes of Opole and later the Bohemian Crown, was probably a compact, square keep with a single high roof and limited decorative treatment. It served primarily as a defensive seat. Over the following centuries it was successively adapted for residential use, though the basic fortified form endured until the eighteenth century.

=== The Baroque palace ===
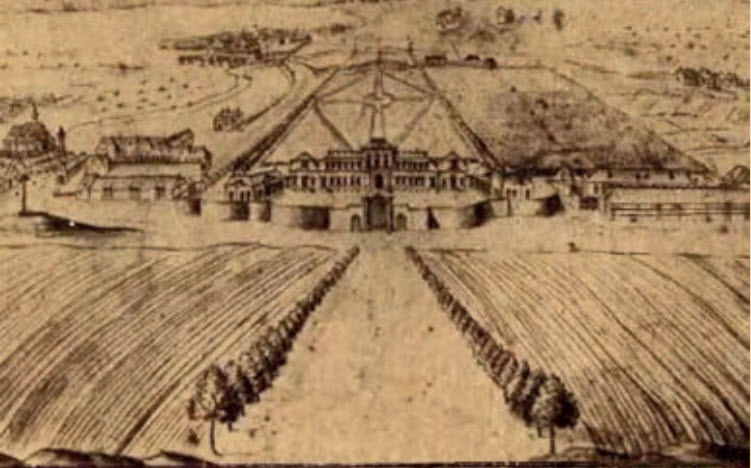
The 18th century baroque palace

After the estate passed to Adolph Magnus von Hoym in 1714, the medieval stronghold lost its defensive purpose. Between 1716 and 1720, Hoym built a new baroque garden palace on the opposite side of the Kłodnica River. The design of this early Schloss Slawentzitz reflected the architectural ideals of Versailles, with an emphasis on axial composition, symmetry, and the interplay of house and garden. The palace was set within extensive formal parterres, reached through terraces descending to ornamental ponds. A series of ancillary buildings—the orangery, aviary, rose garden, and fruit orchards—completed the ensemble. Although the building itself was destroyed by fire within a few decades, fragments of Hoym’s garden layout were later incorporated into the redesigned nineteenth-century park. One surviving structure from this period is the small baroque garden pavilion, now called the Belweder, which remains standing today.

=== The 19th century palace ===
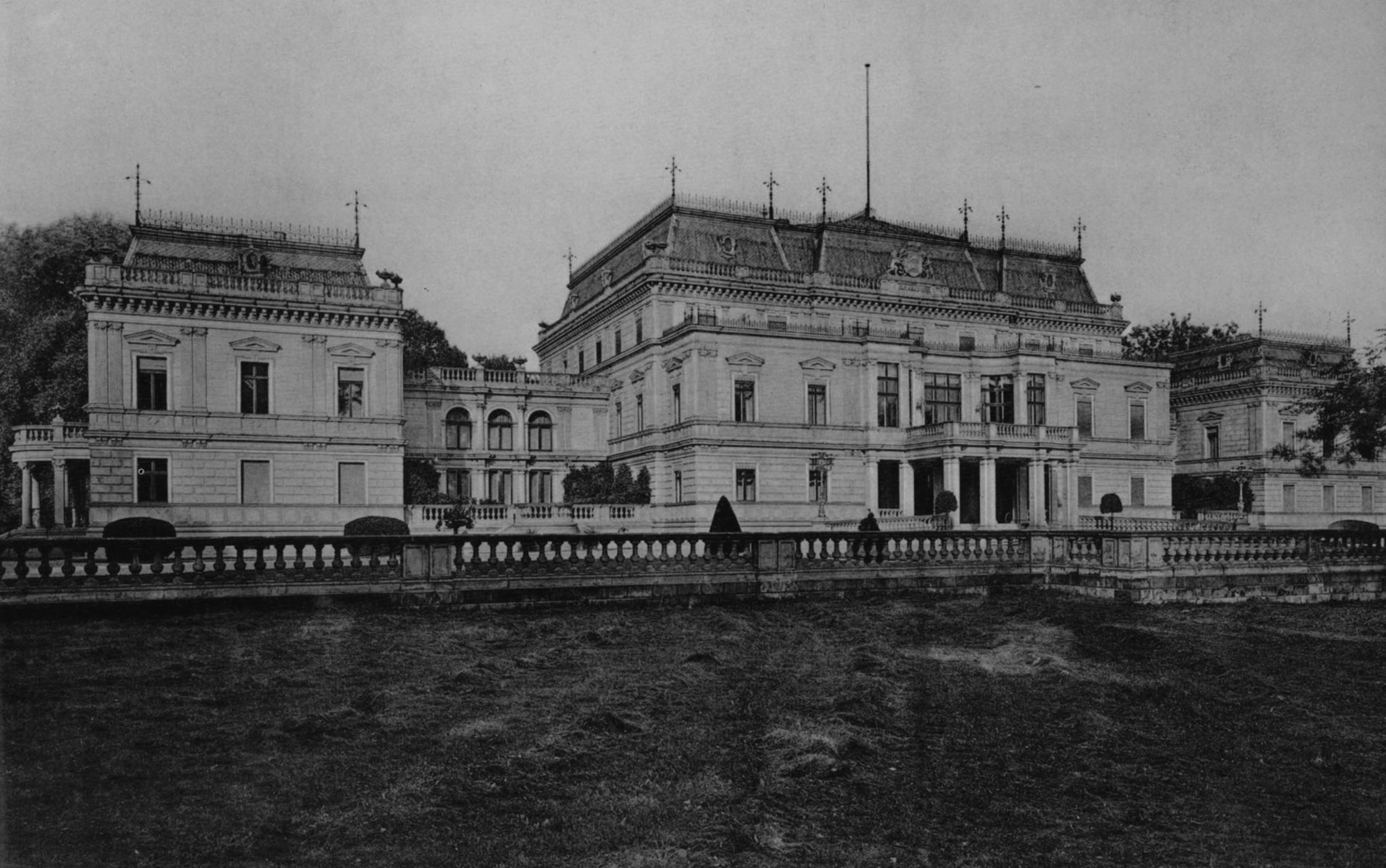
Schloss Slawentzitz with the new side wings around 1905/1910

The nineteenth-century palace was constructed by Prince August zu Hohenlohe-Öhringen after the destruction of the old house by lightning in 1827. Completed around 1830, the new residence adopted a restrained late-classical design with Baroque and Italianate elements. It was a three-storey mansion with mansard roofs, planned on an E-shaped ground plan. The central block contained the main entrance with a portico of four columns supporting a balustraded terrace; the side wings, two storeys high, were joined by arcaded galleries and featured semicircular porticos at their ends.

The façades were articulated by paired pilasters, projecting cornices, and “eared” window frames characteristic of Silesian neoclassicism. Balustrades crowned the upper walls, and the overall composition was monumental but balanced, reflecting the taste of a noble family that combined aristocratic tradition with industrial modernity. Inside, the palace contained approximately forty-five rooms, including a large ballroom, a suite of salons, and guest apartments decorated with stuccowork, mirrors, and parquet floors.

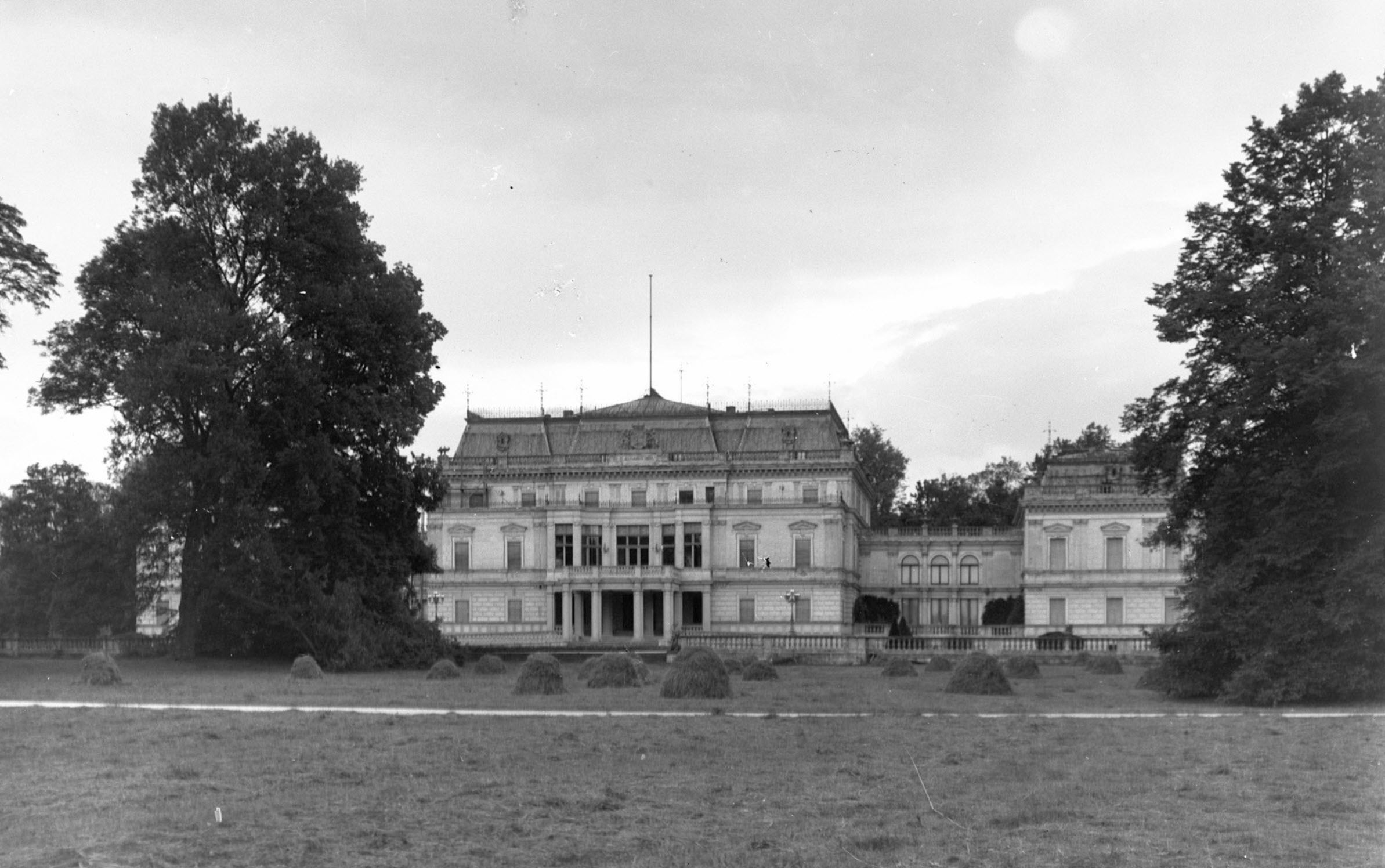
Schloss Slawentzitz in the 1920s

Between 1867 and 1868, Prince Hugo zu Hohenlohe-Öhringen, later Duke of Ujest, enlarged the palace by adding new side wings and modernising the interiors. He also constructed new service buildings and adapted the estate for representative functions. The palace thus became one of the most impressive noble residences in Upper Silesia, earning the epithet “the Silesian Versailles.”

=== The Landscape Park ===
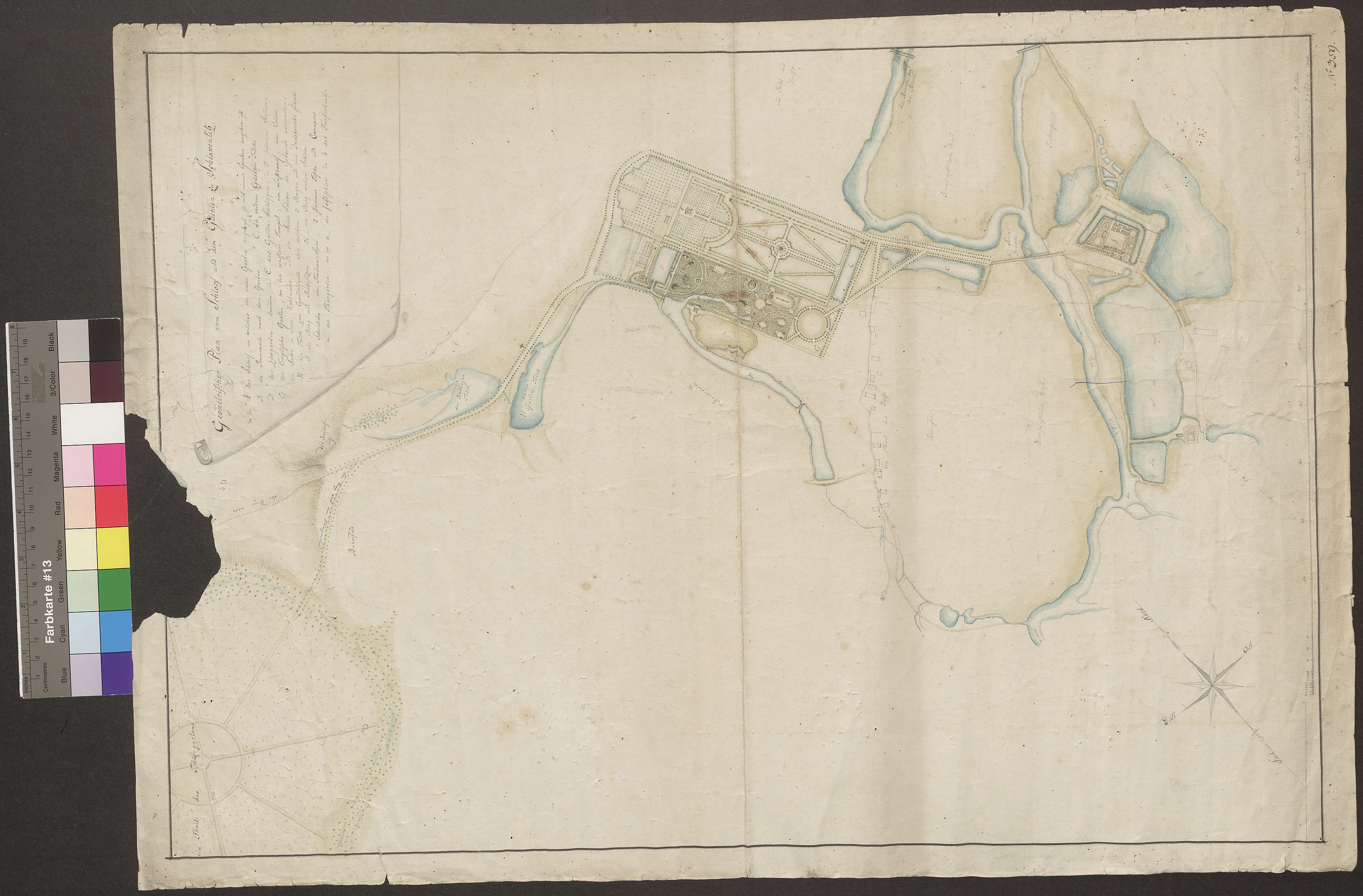
Plan of the gardens at Slawentzitz before the restyling as an English landscape garden (1790). The palace is located right above

The surrounding landscape park, developed from the eighteenth-century baroque gardens, was reconfigured by Prince Friedrich Ludwig von Hohenlohe-Ingelfingen into a romantic English landscape park. It extended over several dozen hectares, making it one of the four largest historic gardens in the Opole region. Within the park were ornamental lakes, bridges, winding avenues, and several architectural features — including a temple of reflection, a Siberian hut, and a cast-iron family mausoleum designed after the prince’s death. A broad ornamental pond and fountain, together with the orangery and greenhouses, created a picturesque setting that framed the palace façade.

During the nineteenth and early twentieth centuries, the palace and park became a key element of Hohenlohe representation. Large hunting parties were organised in the surrounding forests, and imperial visitors, including Emperor Wilhelm II and Tsar Nicholas II, were received in Sławięcice with ceremonial splendour. Contemporary descriptions emphasised the quality of the interiors, the hospitality of the hosts, and the integration of architecture, gardens, and industry—a unique combination of feudal elegance and modern enterprise.

== See also ==
At the turn of the twentieth century, Upper Silesia ranked among the wealthiest industrial regions of Europe, owing to its vast coal, iron and zinc resources. Contemporary economic surveys noted that six of Germany’s ten richest men resided in the province, a concentration of wealth that shaped both its economy and cultural landscape. Their fortunes were reflected in the construction and expansion of grand aristocratic residences, many of which still dominate the region’s architectural heritage. Next to Sławięcice palace, these residences were:

- Kopice Palace (German: Schloss Koppitz), a residence of the Schaffgotsch family.
- Moszna Castle (German: Schloss Moschen), a residence of the Tiele-Winckler family.
- Neudeck Palace (German: Schloss Neudeck), the residence of the princely Henckel von Donnersmarck family. The palace was also known as Little Versailles or Upper Silesian Versailles.
- Pławniowice Palace (German: Schloss Plawniowitz), the residence of the Ballestrem family.
- Pszczyna Castle (German: Schloss Pless), a residence of the Hochberg family, princes of Pless, who also owned Książ Castle (German: Schloss Fürstenstein) in Silesia.

Another important aristocratic residence was the Rudy Palace, seat of the Dukes of Ratibor, a branch of the Hohenlohe family. Although wealthy and influential, this line did not rank among the ten richest magnate families in Germany.

== Literature ==
- Alexander Duncker (1866–1867). Die ländlichen Wohnsitze, Schlösser und Residenzen der ritterschaftlichen Grundbesitzer in der preussischen Monarchie - Neunter Band (in German). Berlin: Verlag Alexander Duncker. pp. 55–58.
- Helmut Sieber (1961). 'Schlösser und Herrensitze in Schlesien - Nach alten Stichen (in German). Frankfurt am Main: Wolfgang Weidlich Verlag. p. 101.
- Helmut Sieber (1971). Schlösser in Schlesien (in German). Frankfurt am Main: Weidlich. pp. 137–138.
- Josef von Golitschek (1988). Schlesien, Land der Schlösser: 286 Schlösser in 408 Meisterfotos - Band II Das Erbe der Ahnen Moschen bis Zyrowa) (in German). München: Orbis Verlag. pp. 168–169. ISBN 3572092752.
- Bernhard Muschol (1993). Die Herrschaft Slawentzitz/Ehrenforst in Oberschlesien: Piastisches Kammergut im Spätmittelalter, sächsischer Adelsbesitz und Hohenlohesche Residenz in der Neuzeit (in German). Sigmaringen: J. Thorbecke Verlag. ISBN 978-3799565134.
- Galka, Aleksandra (2023). "Historia i legendy Zamek i pałace w Sławięcicach". Zamkowego Wzgórza (in Polish). Kędzierzyn-Koźle: 20–22.
- Garowski, Marek (2023). Pałac w Sławięcicach (in Polish). Matiang.
