= Thaddäus Schäpe =

Thaddäus Schäpe (7 March 1954 – 1 September 2004) was the founder and first head of the House of Polish-German Cooperation, following the fall of communism. Schäpe saliently contributed to the process of German-Polish reconciliation, especially in the historical region of Upper Silesia.

== Biography ==
Thaddäus Schäpe was born on 7 March 1954 in Koźle (nowadays part of Kędzierzyn-Koźle), Poland. Following World War II, at the Potsdam Conference the Allies passed to Poland most of the German territories east of the Oder-Neisse line. With the Allies' approval and cooperation, these territories' German populations were expelled to postwar Germany. Yet, some populations, defined as 'autochthonous' (autochtoni in Polish) and seen as of Slavic origin were retained, including in Upper Silesia. Nowadays their descendants identify as Silesians and members of the German minority. Although officially autochthons were regarded to be Polish, during the communist period they were targeted with a variety of forced Polonizing measures, including changes to their names and surnames for the sake of making them appear less German and more Polish.

As a result, when Schäpe was born, his parents had no choice but to use the Polonized form of their surname and to give their son a name deemed as Polish. At birth he was named Tadeusz Szopa. At the turn of the 1970s, in the broader framework of détente, West Germany and communist Poland established relations. As an element of this process, Warsaw agreed to let for tightly controlled emigration of autochthons to West Germany. After arriving to West Germany they were defined as Aussiedlers (de), or ethnic German 'resettlers.' At that time, Schäpe's family left for West Germany, where their regained the traditional German spelling of their surname and first names.

Due to the lack of umlaut letters in the Polish spelling system, in Polish-language literature, Schäpe's surname is often given as Schaepe and his given name as Thaddaeus, or in the Polish language form as Tadeusz.

== Career ==
In May 1992, the foundation of the Social Democratic Party of Germany (SPD), that is, the Friedrich Ebert Foundation opened a regional branch in the Upper Silesian city of Gliwice. Thaddäus Schäpe, as an active SPD member, with a knowledge of the region and a good command of the Polish language, led this initiative and headed this branch until 1997. It closed, because meanwhile Schäpe had secured support and funding from the Konrad Adenauer Foundation of the Christian Democratic Union of Germany party (CDU) and the Friedrich Naumann Foundation of the Free Democratic Party for a new supra-partisan project.

Based on the aforementioned branch, on 17 February 1998, German President Roman Herzog inaugurated a House of Polish-German Cooperation in Gliwice. During this event Polish President Aleksander Kwaśniewski was represented by Minister Head of the Chancellery of the Polish President Danuta Hübner. (On this day, Kwaśniewski attended the funeral of the deceased former Polish Minister of Defence pl:Jerzy Milewski.) Schäpe acted as the House's first head. In German literature, this institution is known as the de:Haus der Deutsch-Polnischen Zusammenarbeit (HDPZ), whereas in Polish as the pl:Dom Współpracy Polsko-Niemieckiej (DWPN).

The House of Polish-German Cooperation became the main institution of Polish-German reconciliation in Upper Silesia. It also functions as the main think-tank of Poland's German minority. In 2002 the House opened its branch in Opole, or the historical capital of Upper Silesia. Nowadays the think-tank's seat is located there.

== Death ==
On 1 September 2004, Schäpe died of cancer in a hospital in Cologne, Germany.

== Publications ==
Schäpe, Thaddäus, ed. 1993. Programy pomocowe dla Polski. Gliwice: Fundacja im. Friedricha Eberta na Śląsku. ISBN 9788385338338, 68pp.

Berlińska, Danuta and Schäpe, Thaddäus, eds. 1994. Wielokulturowość - problem czy bogactwo? Gliwice: Wokół Nas. ISBN 8385338284. 146pp.

Bieniasz, Stanisław and Schäpe, Thaddäus, eds. 1996. Nowa przedsiębiorczość i nowa klasa średnia w nowych landach niemieckich. Gliwice: Friedrich Ebert Stiftung. Büro Schlesien. ISBN 9788385338536, 78pp.

Schäpe, Thaddäus; Jöhling, Wolfgang; Bieniasz, Stanislaw and Karwat, Krzysztof. 1996. Polsko-niemiecka wspólnota losów. Uciekinierzy, wysiedleni, wypędzeni w niemieckiej "literaturze wypędzenia" i polskiej literaturze kresowej. Konferencja literacka, Gliwice, 21-23 listopad 1996. Gliwice: Dom Współpracy Polsko-Niemieckiej. ISBN 9788385338628, 220pp.

Schäpe, Thaddäus, ed. 1998. Obywatelstwo i tożsamość narodowa w kontekście integracji europejskiej. konferencja międzynarodowa. Opole, 28-29 października 1998. Gliwice: Dom Współpracy Polsko-Niemieckiej. ISBN 8385338780, 108pp.

Gerlich, Marian Grzegorz and Schäpe, Thaddäus, eds. 2000. Zabrze. Tożsamość ciągłość i zmiana. Materiały z konferencji zorganizowanej przez Urząd Miejski w Zabrzu, DWP-N w Gliwicach i MM w Zabrzu w dn. 29-30 listopada 1999 r. w Zabrzu. Zabrze: MM. ISBN 8387436224, 84pp.
