= Kędzierzyn-Koźle =

City in Silesia

Kędzierzyn-Koźle Kandrzin-Koźle
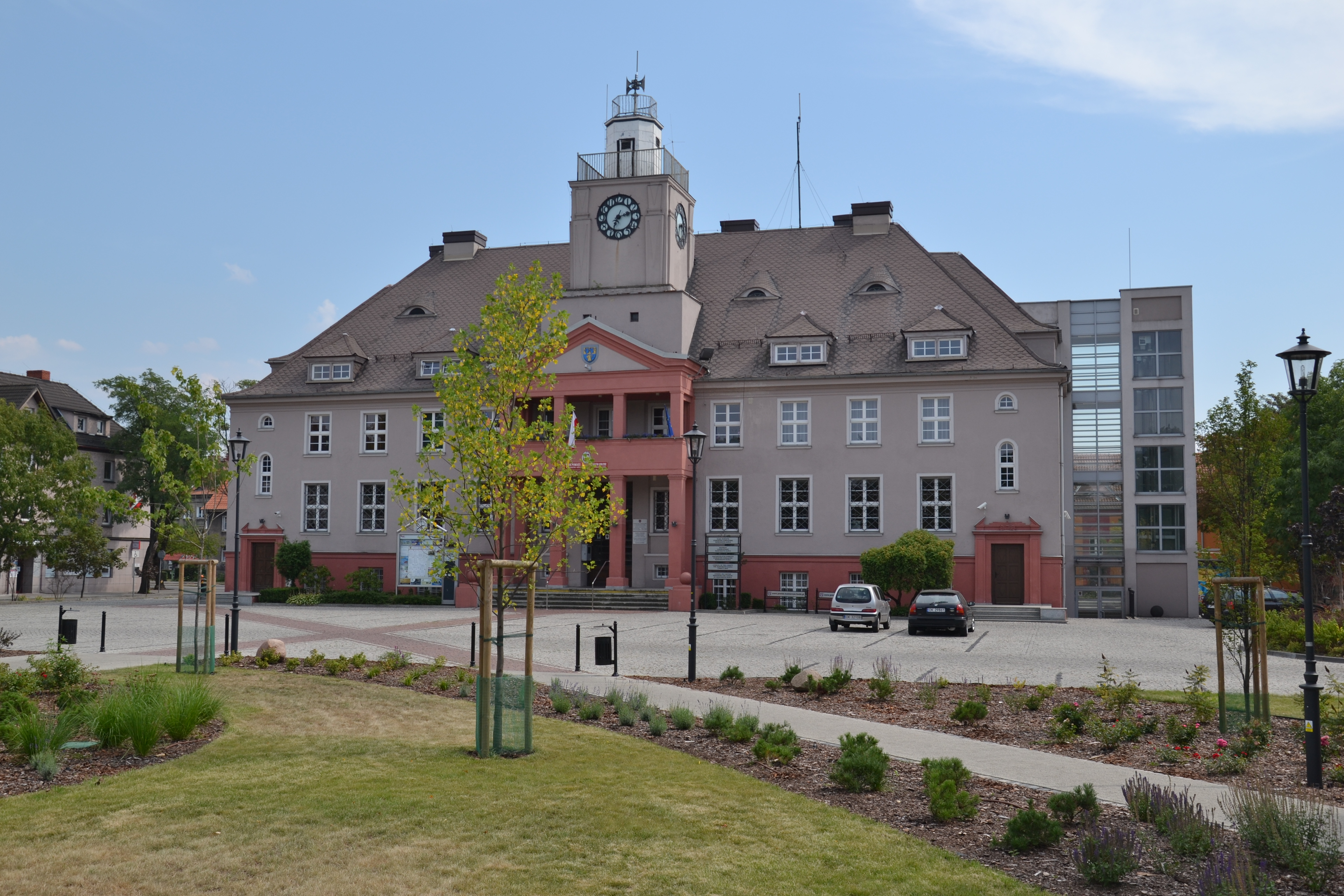
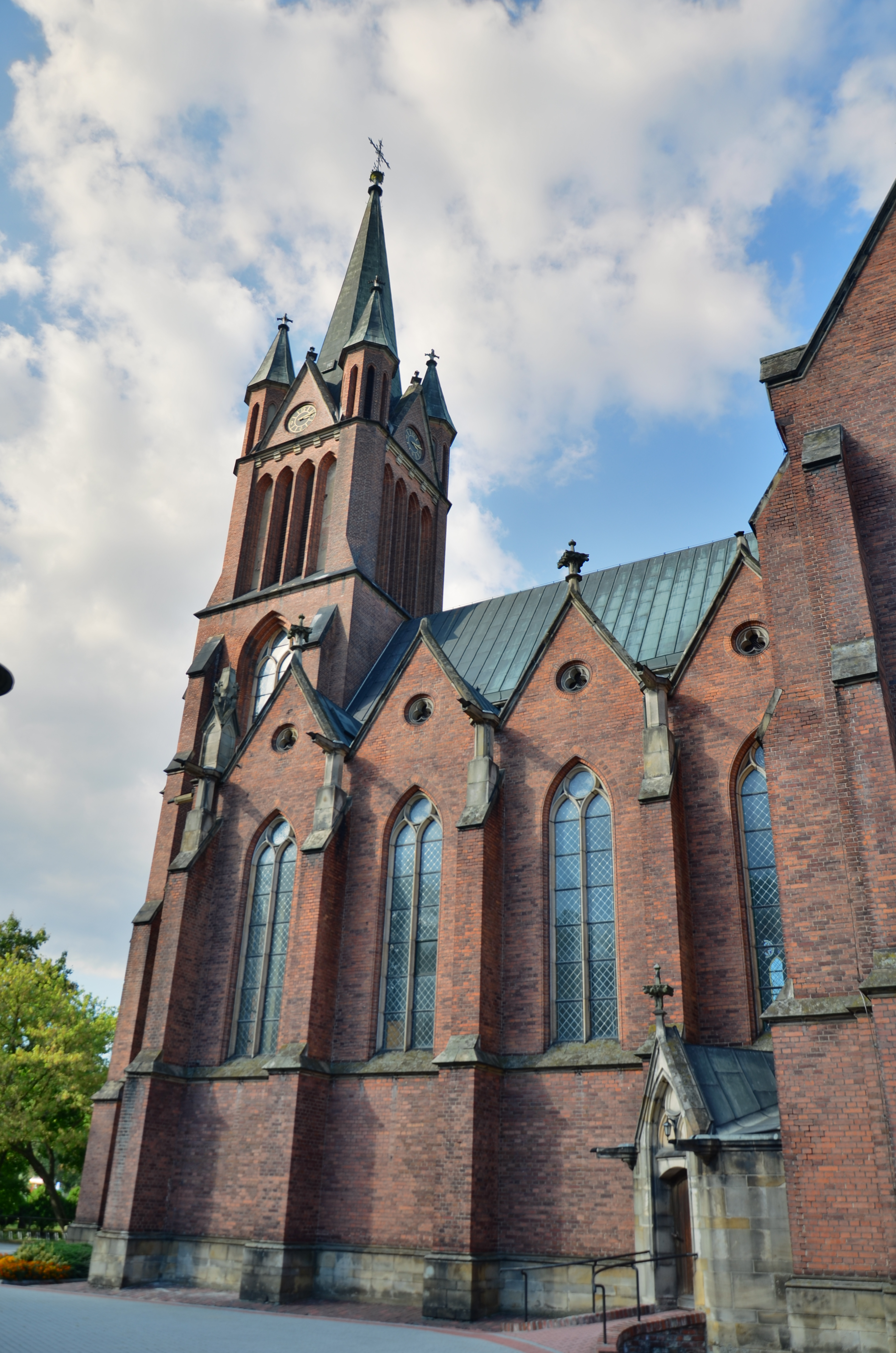
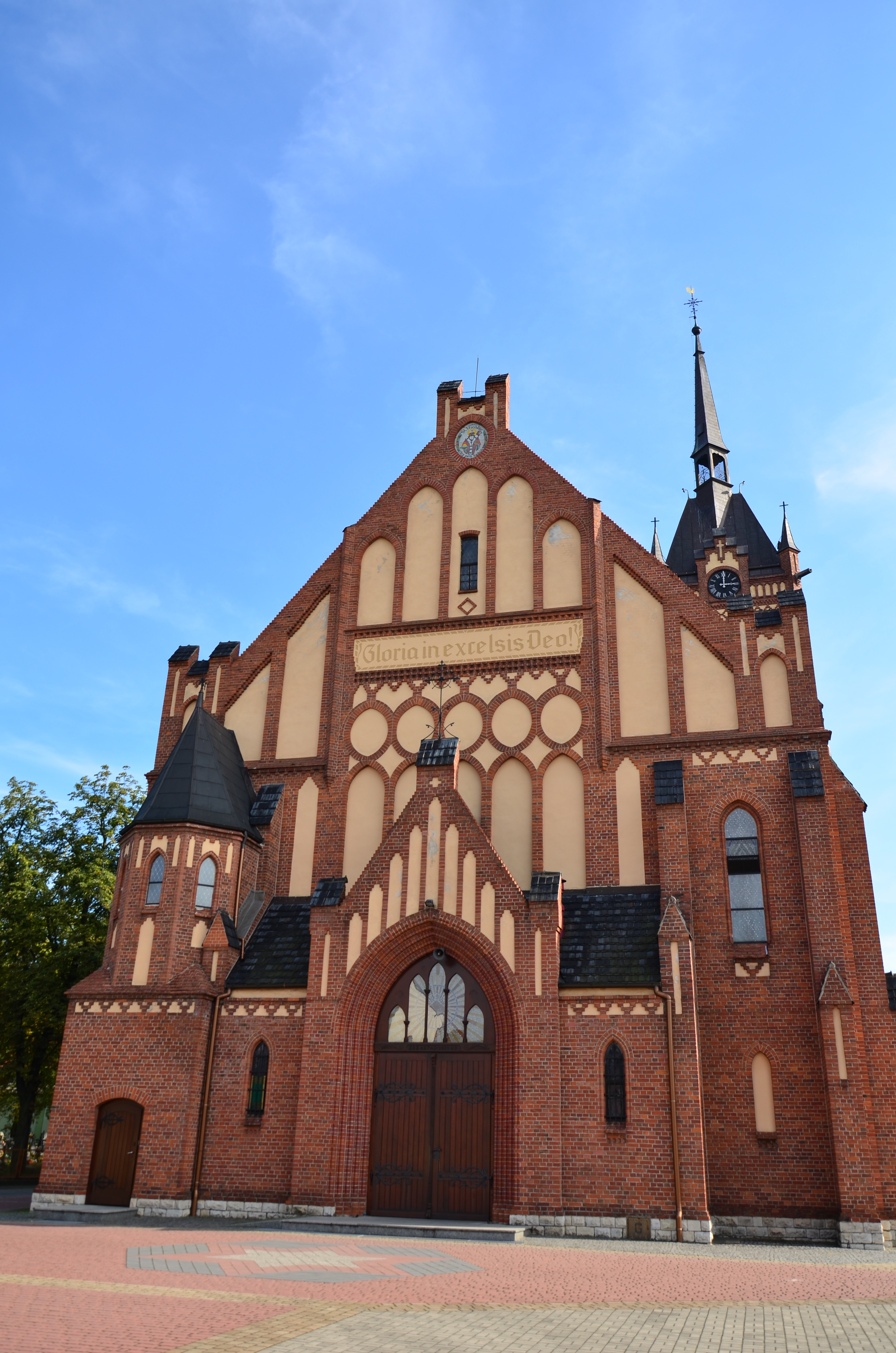
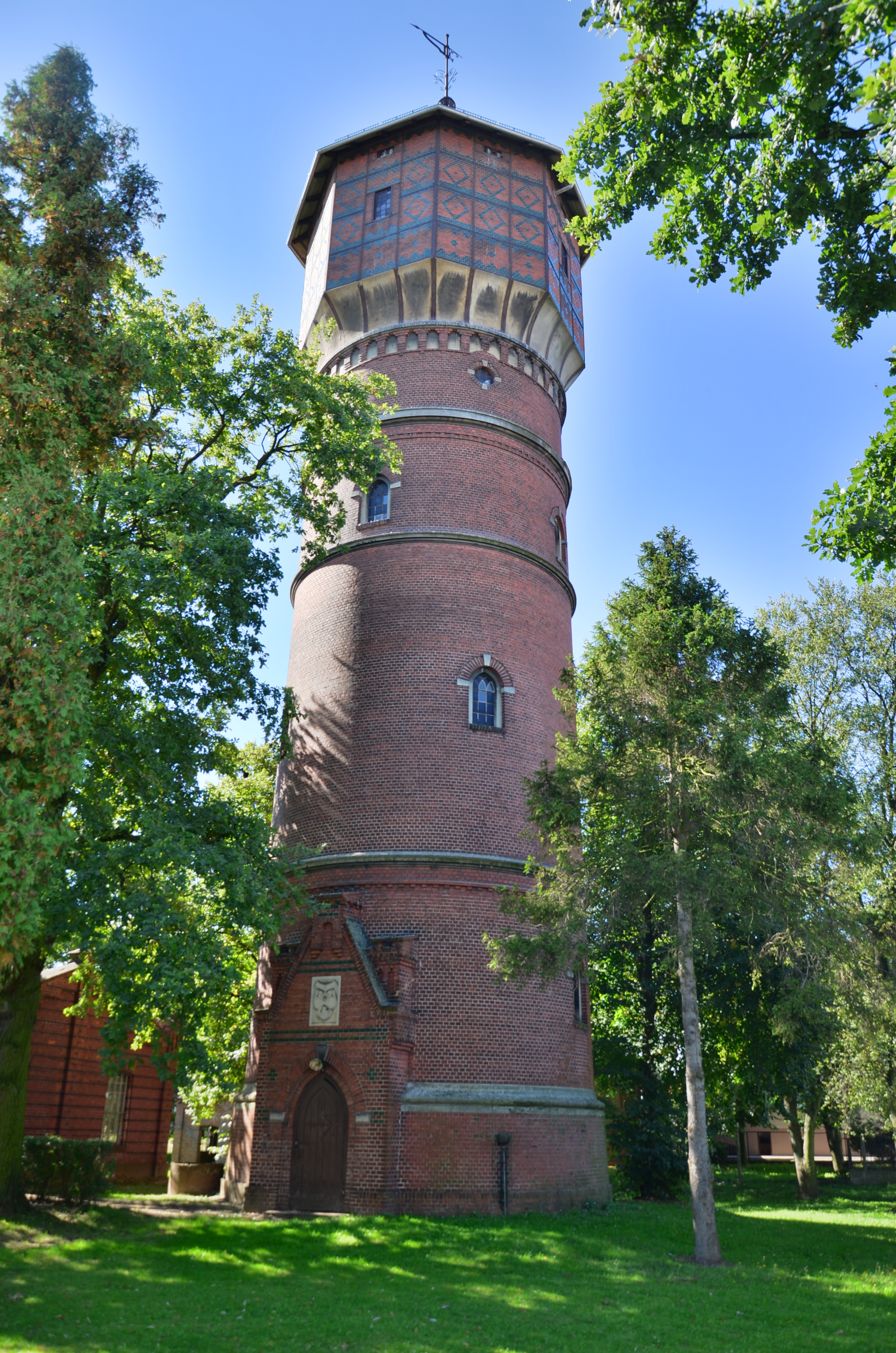
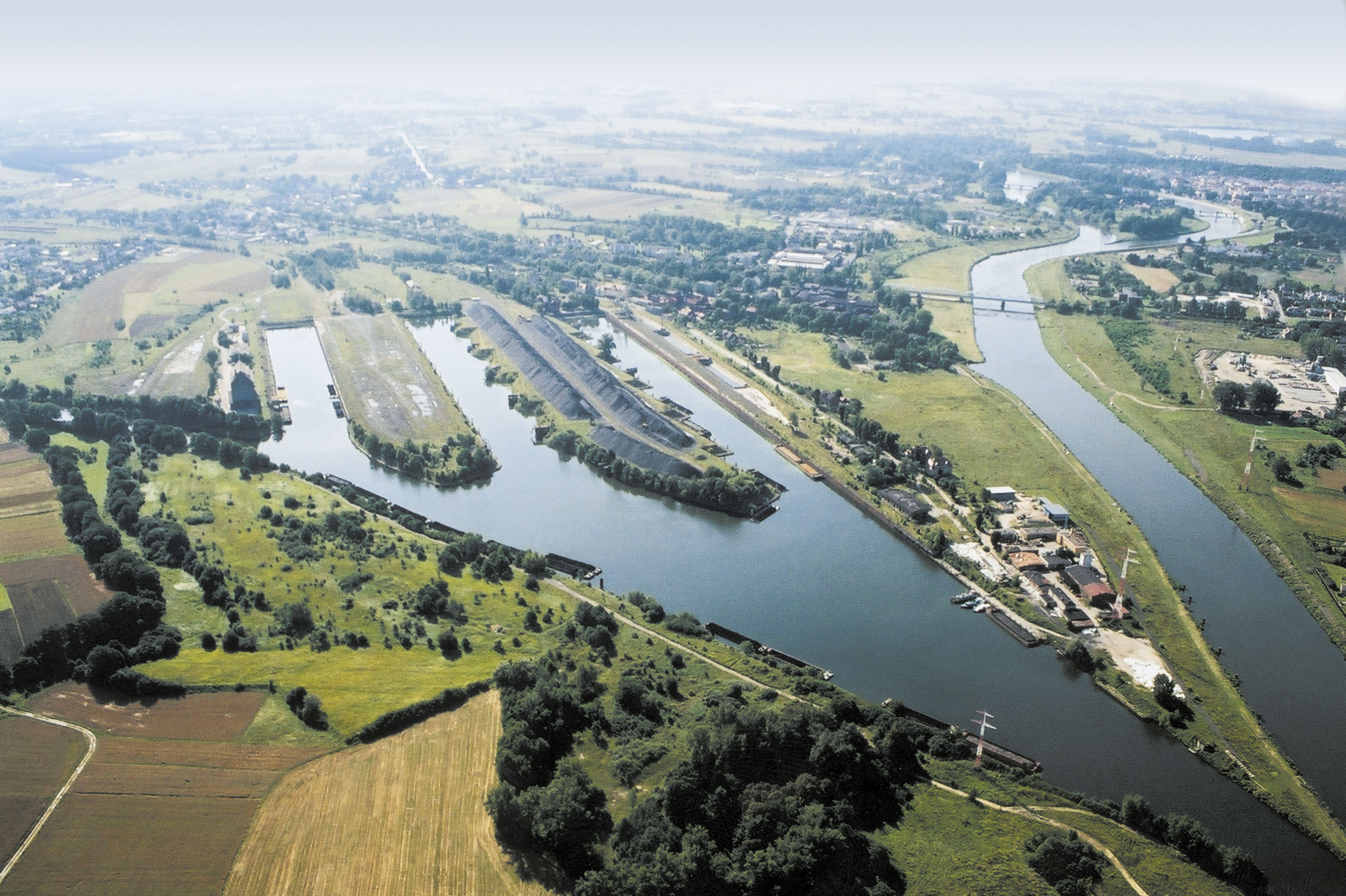
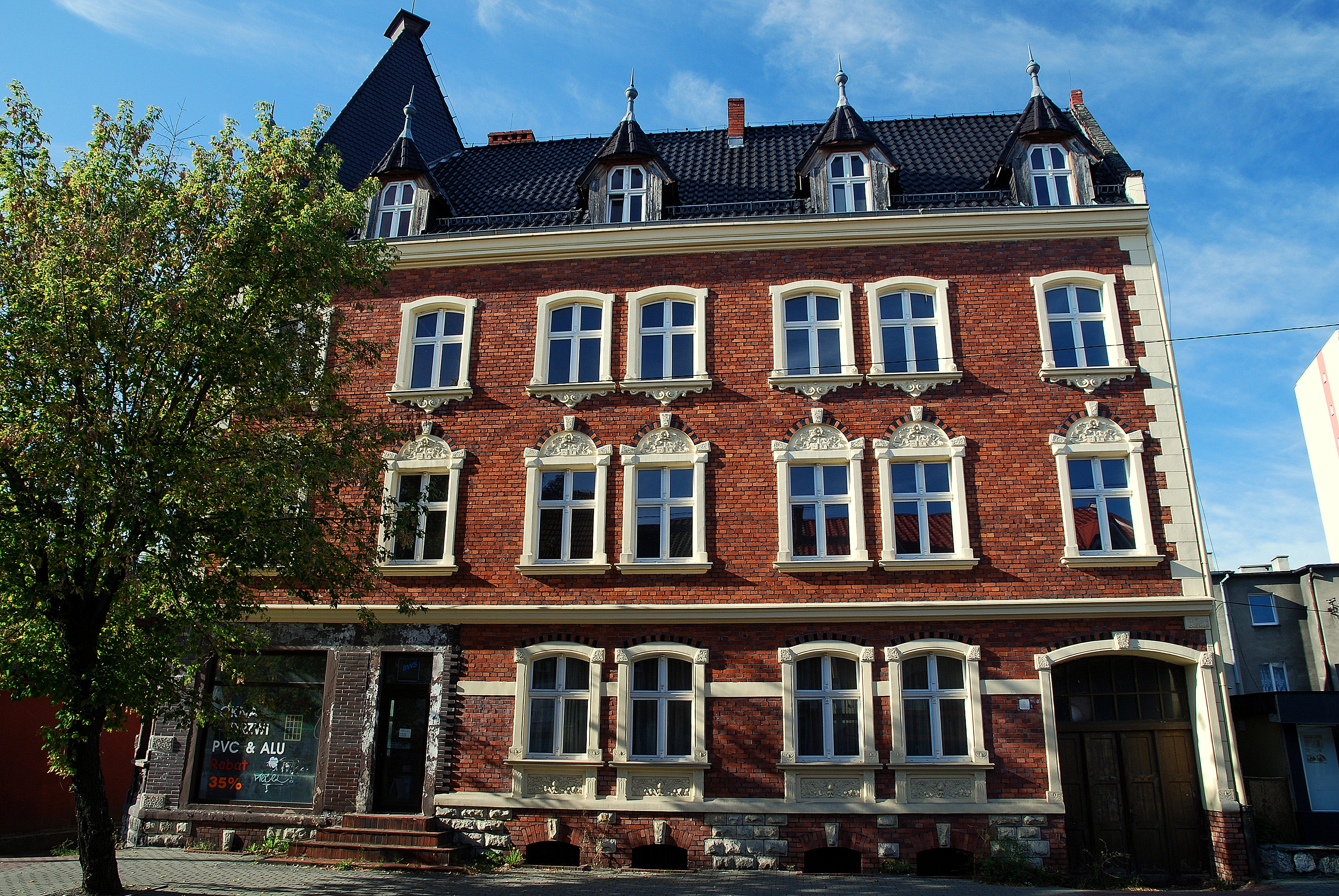
- City Hall Saint Catherine Saint Nicholas Water tower Port of Koźle and Gliwice Canal Old tenements

- Flag Coat of arms

- Location within Poland
- Coordinates: 50°21′N 18°12′E
- Country: Poland
- Voivodeship: Opole
- County: Kędzierzyn-Koźle
- Gmina: Kędzierzyn-Koźle (urban gmina)

Government
  - City mayor: Sabina Nowosielska

Area
  - Total: 123.42 km^{2} (47.65 sq mi)
- Elevation: 180 m (590 ft)

Population (31 December 2024)
  - Total: 50,927 ▼
  - Density: 412.63/km^{2} (1,068.7/sq mi)
- Time zone: UTC+1 (CET)
  - Summer (DST): UTC+2 (CEST)
- Postal code: 47-200, 47-220, 47-232
- Vehicle registration: OK
- City districts: Azoty, Blachownia Śląska, Cisowa, Kędzierzyn, Koźle, Koźle Port, Koźle Rogi, Kłodnica, Kuźniczka, Lenartowice, Miejsce Kłodnickie, Sławięcice
- Website: www.kedzierzynkozle.pl

Kędzierzyn-Koźle [kɛɲˈd͡ʑɛʐɨn ˈkɔʑlɛ] (Silesian: Kandrzin-Koźle) is a city in southern Poland, the administrative center of Kędzierzyn-Koźle County. With 58,899 inhabitants as of 2021, it is the second most-populous city in the Opole Voivodeship.

Founded from the merger of the previously separate towns of Kędzierzyn and Koźle, both dating back to the Middle Ages, the city is a major river port and center of chemical industry, and is particularly known for ZAKSA Kędzierzyn-Koźle, one of the top volleyball clubs in Europe in the 2020s.

== Geography and economy ==
Kędzierzyn-Koźle is located in the historic Silesia (Upper Silesia) region at the confluence of the Oder River and its Kłodnica tributary. Situated on the lower reaches of the Gliwice Canal, it is a place of a major river port, has rail connections with all major cities of Poland and lies close to the west of the Metropolis GZM. The town is a major location of chemical industry, the site of several factories and a power plant at Blachownia Śląska. Zakłady Azotowe Kędzierzyn, a subsidiary of Grupa Azoty located in Kędzierzyn, is one of the largest chemical plants in Poland.

In 1975, the historic core Koźle on the left bank of the Oder was merged with the municipalities of Kędzierzyn, Sławięcice, and Kłodnica on the right bank, which had developed to suburbs since the 19th century industrialisation, to form present-day Kędzierzyn-Koźle.

== Etymology ==
The name of the city is of Polish origin, with Kędzierzyn coming from the male name Kędziora or Kędzierzawy, and Koźle coming from the word kozioł, which means "he-goat, buck". The city has a canting arms as it depicts three heads of goats.

== History ==
=== Koźle ===
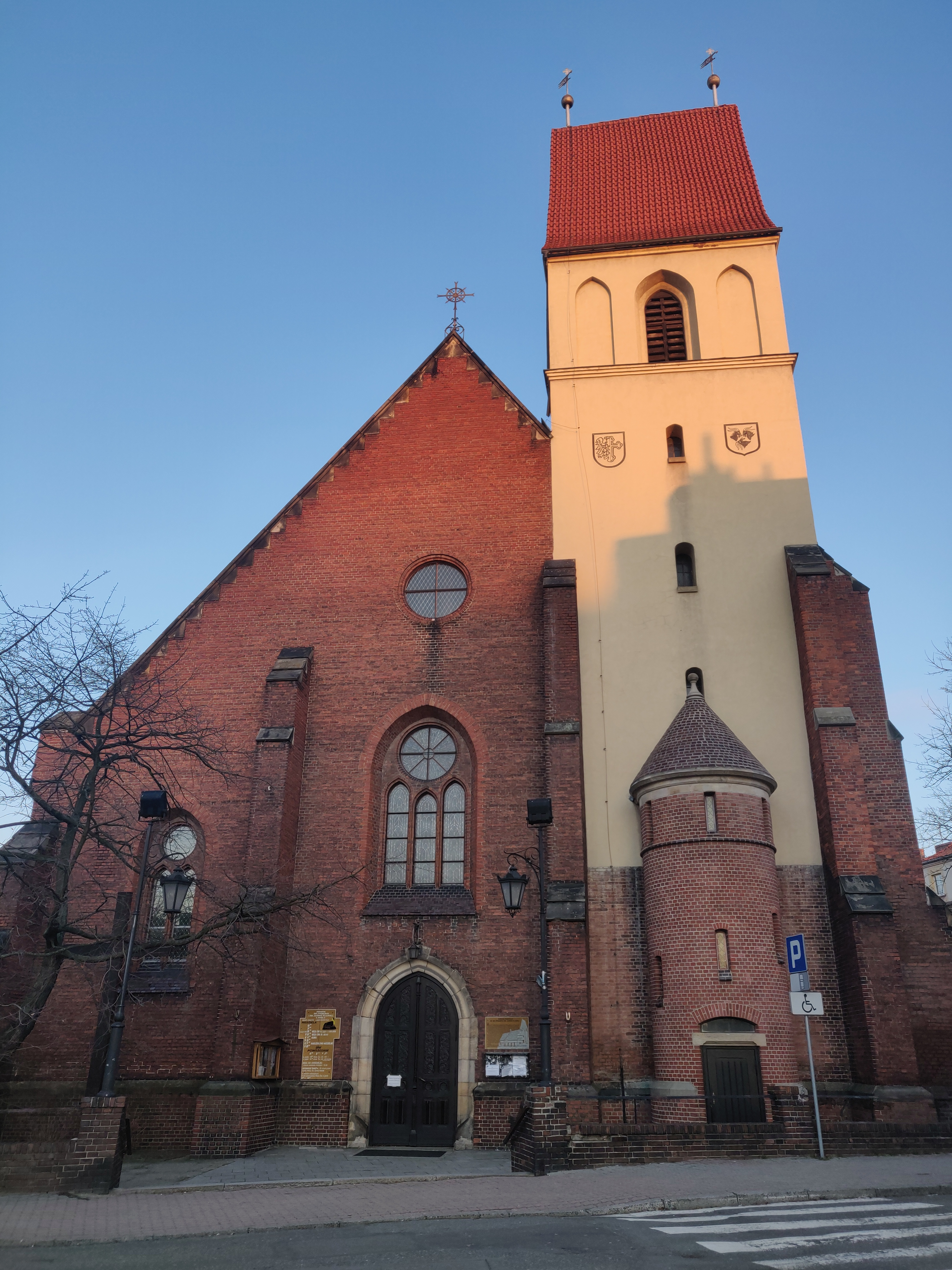
Saint Sigismund church in Koźle

A border fortress held by a minor member of the Polish Piast dynasty was first mentioned in 1104, when it was besieged by the Přemyslid prince Svatopluk of Olomouc. The Koźle castellany was part of the Polish Duchy of Silesia since 1138, from 1172/73 of the Upper Silesian Duchy of Racibórz under the rule of the Silesian Piasts. In 1281, it was inherited by Duke Casimir of Bytom, who also called himself Duke of Koźle. Casimir soon turned to the neighbouring Kingdom of Bohemia; in 1289, he paid homage to King Wenceslaus II and received his duchy as a Bohemian fief. In 1293, he vested Koźle with town privileges, had walls erected. After Casimir was succeeded by his son Władysław in 1312, Koźle remained the capital of an autonomous duchy, ruled by the Bytom branch of the Silesian Piasts until the death of Duke Bolesław in 1355. King Charles IV adjudicated the reverted Bohemian fief to the Piast duke Konrad I of Oleśnica, whereafter the town remained a possession of the Oleśnica line until it became extinct in 1492. In 1431, Duke Konrad VII the White founded a Monastery of the Order of Friars Minor in Koźle.

Again purchased by the Opole duke Jan II the Good in 1509, the Koźle estates were ultimately incorporated into the Lands of the Bohemian Crown upon his death in 1532. Within the Habsburg monarchy, it was temporarily pawned to the Hohenzollern Margraves of Brandenburg-Ansbach. The fortress was besieged several times during the Thirty Years' War and occupied by Danish troops under the command of Duke John Ernest I of Saxe-Weimar in 1627, before they were defeated by Imperial forces under Albrecht von Wallenstein. Again conquered by a Swedish contingent led by Lennart Torstensson in 1642, the town remained almost completely devastated. In 1645, it returned to Polish rule under the House of Vasa.

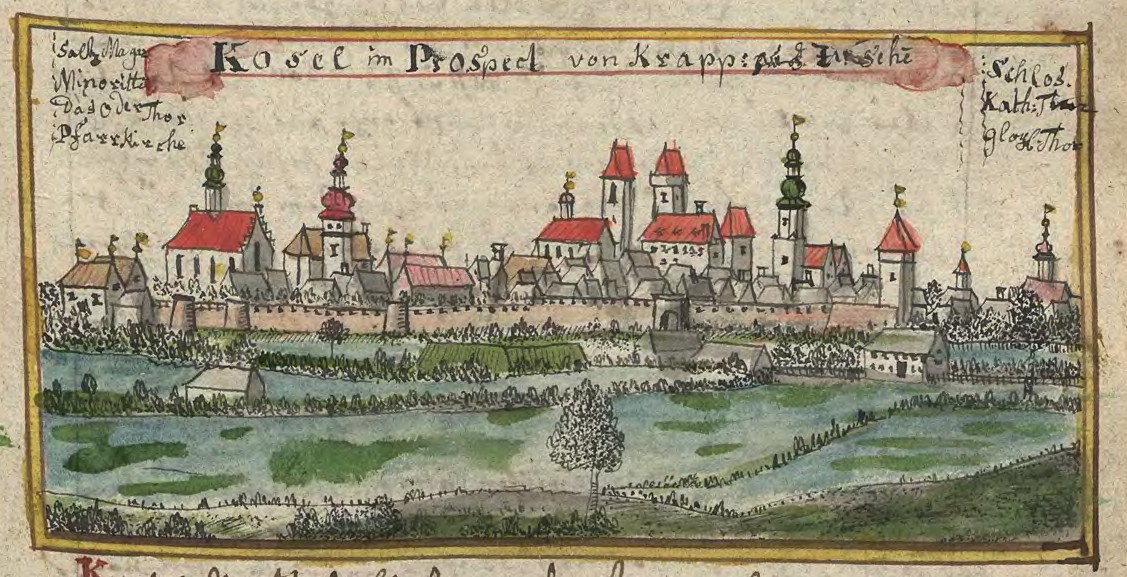
Panorama of the town from the 18th century

Occupied by the troops of King Frederick the Great in the First Silesian War, Koźle as Cosel with the bulk of Silesia became a Prussian possession by the 1742 Treaty of Breslau. The king ordered the extension of the fortifications, nevertheless the town was occupied by Habsburg Pandurs during the Second Silesian War in 1744 and had to be reconquered by the Prussian Army two years later; the shelling again caused heavy losses and damages. The rebuilt fortress held against Austrian sieges during the Seven Years' War, even General Ernst Gideon von Laudon in 1760 had to raise his siege. In the 18th century, Cosel belonged to the tax inspection region of Neustadt (Prudnik). In 1807 the Prussian garrison withstood another besiegement by the allied Napoleonic and Bavarian forces under General Bernhard Erasmus von Deroy until a peace was made by the Treaty of Tilsit. In 1815, Cosel was incorporated into the Prussian Province of Silesia, from 1871 part of the German Empire. The development of the town was promoted by the construction of the Kłodnica Canal from the Oder port to Gliwice from 1806 until 1907. The Polish Bank Ludowy and a local branch of the Polish Sokół movement were founded in the town in 1903 and 1904, respectively.

After World War I and the Upper Silesia plebiscite of March 1921, the Polish insurgents temporarily captured the part of the town east of the Oder during the Third Silesian Uprising. In Koźle, the insurgents seized large supplies of ammunition and food, and some 1,000 railroad cars. After the uprising, however, the town remained part of Germany in the interbellum. Local Polish activists were intensively persecuted by the Germans since 1937.

During World War II, the German administration operated three forced labour subcamps (E2, E153, E155) of the Stalag VIII-B/344 prisoner-of-war camp in the town. In the course of the Vistula–Oder Offensive, the Soviet Red Army from 21 January 1945 attacked the Koźle bridgehead. Afterwards, it became again part of Poland under the re-drawing of borders after World War II.

=== Kędzierzyn and other districts ===
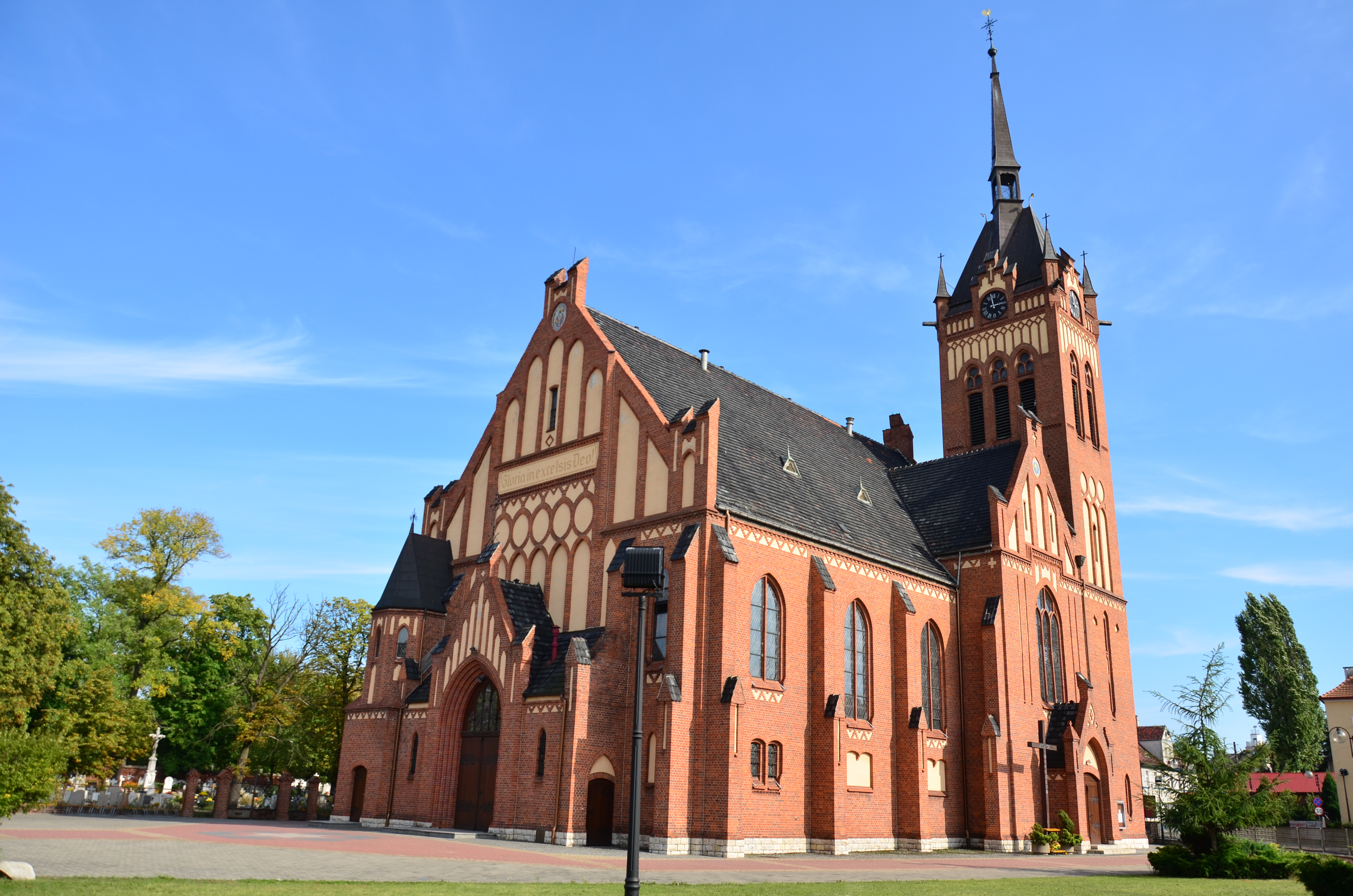
Saint Nicholas Church in Kędzierzyn

Kędzierzyn was founded as a village in the 13th century, and Sławięcice was first mentioned in 13th-century documents, when both settlements were part of fragmented Piast-ruled Poland. Sławięcice even obtained town rights before 1260, but lost them in 1260, as Duke Władysław Opolski transferred them to nearby Ujazd. Sławięcice was once home to a now lost palace.

During the Third Silesian Uprising, the area was the site of heavy fighting between Polish insurgents and Germans. On May 4, 1921, the insurgents captured Sławięcice, then Blachownia Śląska and Cisowa on May 8, Kędzierzyn on May 9, and Kłodnica on May 10. Sławięcice was an essential logistical center for the insurgents for a month, with a field hospital and the headquarters of an insurgent unit. In June 1921, the Germans attacked the Polish insurgents, and recaptured Kędzierzyn. The Germans then massacred captured Polish prisoners of war in nearby Lichynia.

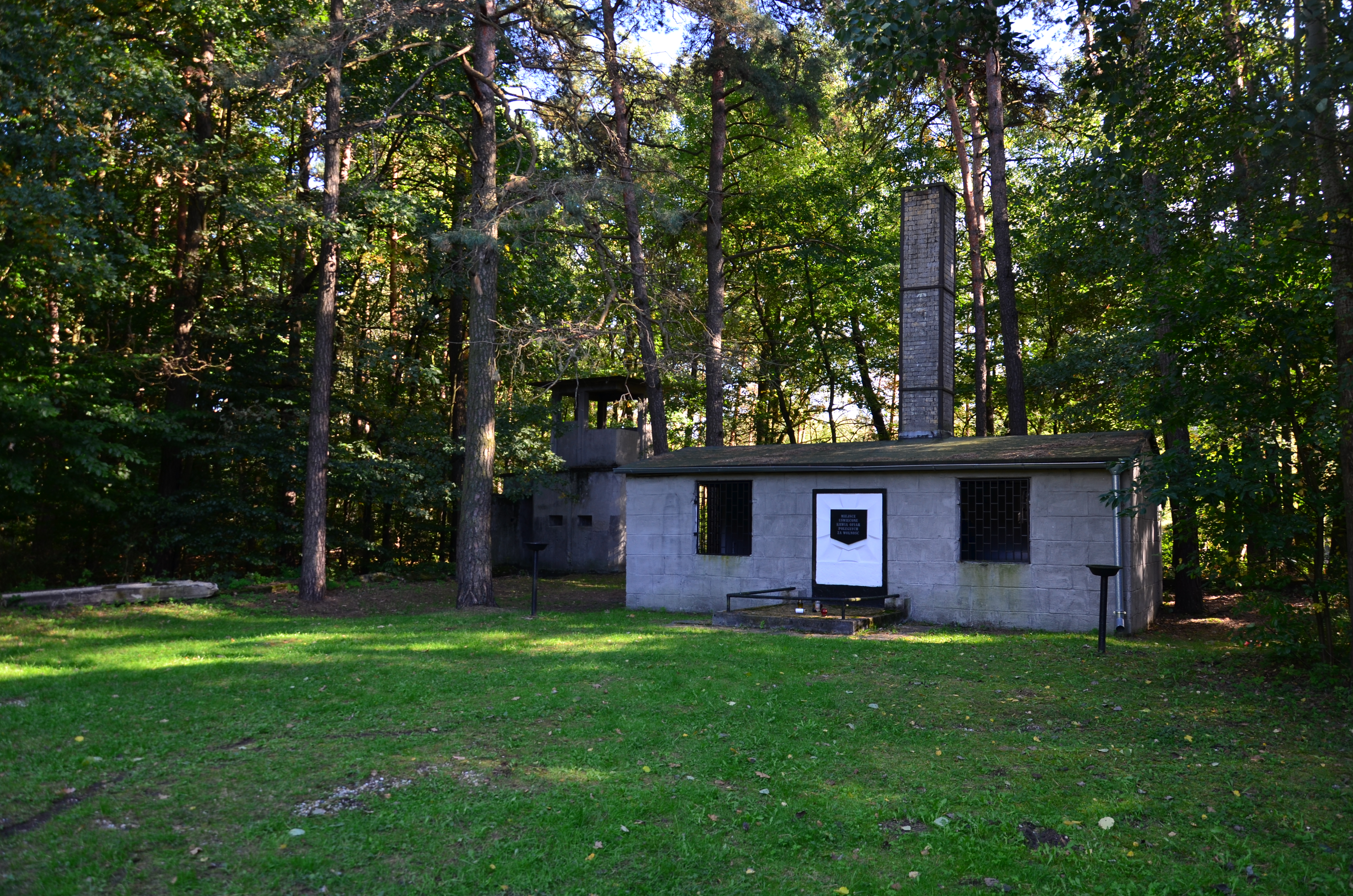
Former Nazi German crematorium in Sławięcice

During World War II, the Germans operated multiple forced labour camps in the area. In Kędzierzyn there was a forced labour "education" camp, and three subcamps (BAB 20/E794, BAB 40/E794, E711A) of the Stalag VIII-B/344 prisoner-of-war camp. In the present-day district of Blachownia Śląska there was a forced labour subcamp of the prison in Strzelce Opolskie, and four subcamps (BAB 21/E793, BAB 48/E793, E3, E714) of the Stalag VIII-B/344 camp. In the present-day district of Kłodnica, there was the E800 subcamp of the Stalag VIII-B/344 camp. In Sławięcice there was another forced labour "education" camp, two subcamps (E6, E207) of the Stalag VIII-B/344 camp, and a subcamp of the Auschwitz concentration camp which operated from April 1, 1944, to January 26, 1945. In Sławięcice, there was also a crematorium for the victims of the camps, which is now a memorial. Allied prisoners of war of various nationalities, Jews, and Polish children were among the victims of the forced labour camps. In the final stages of the war, in 1945, a German-conducted death march of thousands of prisoners of several subcamps of the Auschwitz concentration camp passed through Blachownia and Koźle towards the Gross-Rosen concentration camp.

Following Nazi Germany's defeat in the war, the region was transferred from Germany to Poland as stipulated by the Potsdam Agreement. In the years immediately following World War II, the ethnic German population was expelled, also in accordance with the Potsdam Agreement. The remaining Polish population was joined by Poles displaced from the eastern territories of Poland annexed by the Soviet Union and by 600 Poles repatriated from Lupeni, Romania.

In 1954, Blachownia and Lenartowice merged to form the Blachownia Śląska district in Sławięcice.

In 1999, the branch line connecting the city with Strzelce Opolskie closed as part of Polskie Koleje Państwowe cost-cutting.

== Sports ==
The town is home to ZAKSA Kędzierzyn-Koźle, one of the most successful Polish volleyball clubs, the nine–time Polish Champion, ten–time Polish Cup winner, and three–time winner of CEV Champions League (2021, 2022, 2023).

== Transport ==
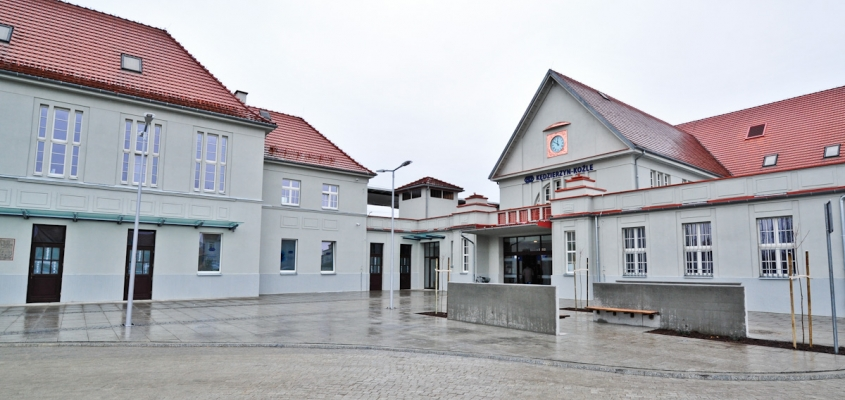
Main railway station

There are five railway stations in the city. Kędzierzyn-Koźle is located at the intersection of National road 40 and Voivodeship roads 408, 410, 418, 423 and 426, and the A4 motorway runs nearby, just north of the city.

== Notable people ==
- Gustav Giemsa (1867–1948), German chemist and bacteriologist
- Aleksander Hnydiuk (born 1978), Polish chess International Master
- Bernhard von Hülsen (1865–1950), German general
- Tomasz Kamusella (born 1967), Polish scholar
- Ewa Komander (born 1985), Polish professional triathlete
- Henryka Mościcka-Dendys (born 1976), Polish diplomat
- Thaddäus Schäpe (1954-2004), German politician and founder of the House of Polish-German Cooperation
- Theodor von Scheve (1851-1922), German chess master and writer
- Kamil Semeniuk (born 1996), Polish volleyball player
- Yuri Shymko (born 1940), Ukrainian-Canadian politician
- Heinrich Tischler (1892-1938), German-Jewish painter and architect
- Rafał Wojaczek (1945–1971), Polish poet

== Twin towns – sister cities ==
Kędzierzyn-Koźle is twinned with:

- Jonava, Lithuania
- Kalush, Ukraine
- Öhringen, Germany
- Pisz, Poland
- Přerov, Czech Republic
- Racibórz, Poland
