= Kłodnica, Kędzierzyn-Koźle =

District of Kędzierzyn-Koźle, Poland

Kłodnica
- District of Kędzierzyn-Koźle
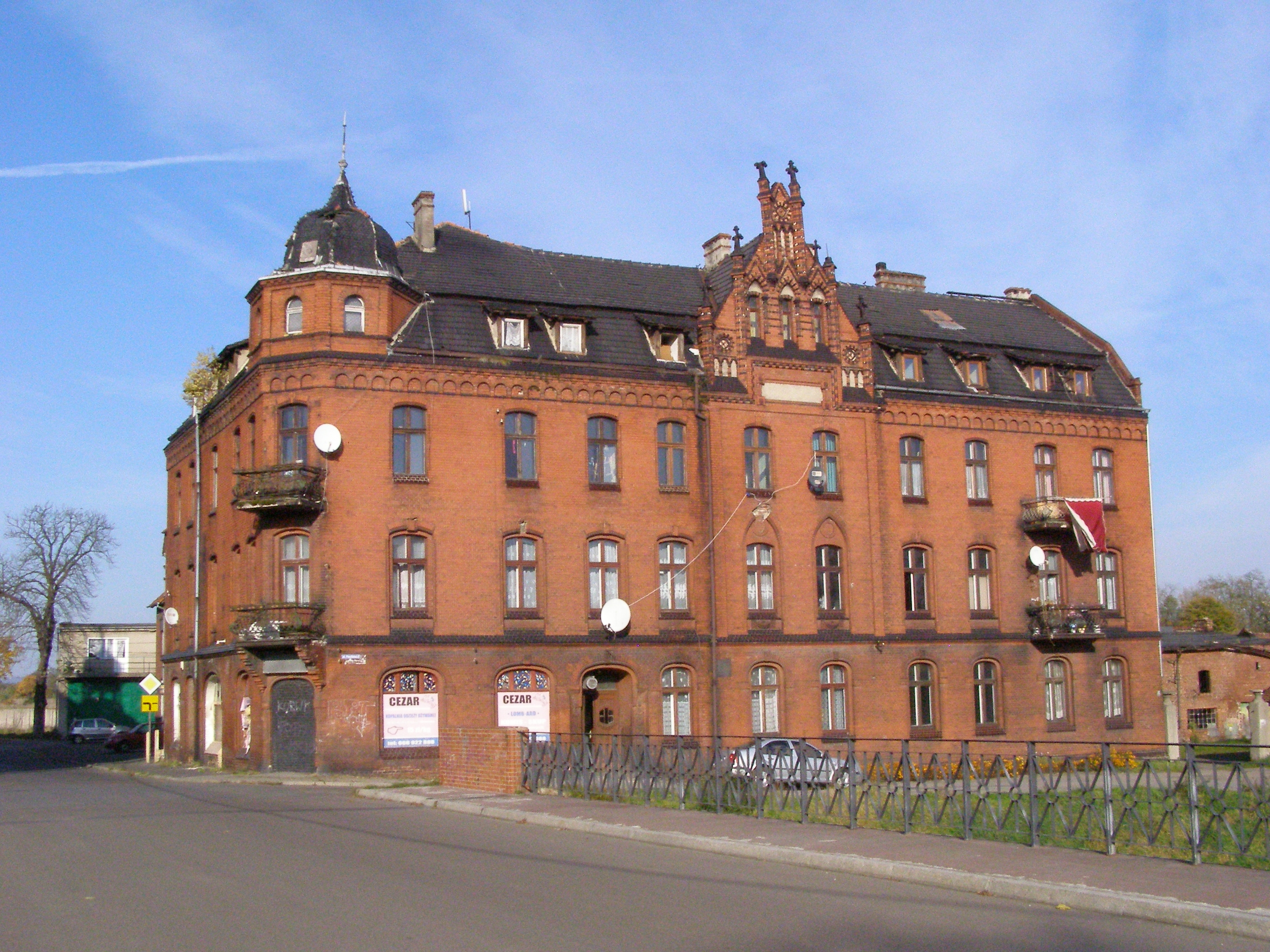

- Location within Poland
- Coordinates: 50°20′50″N 18°10′10″E
- Country: Poland
- Voivodeship: Opole
- County/City: Kędzierzyn-Koźle
- Within city limits: 1975
- Time zone: UTC+1 (CET)
  - Summer (DST): UTC+2 (CEST)
- Postal code: 47-206
- Vehicle registration: OK

Kłodnica [kwɔdˈnit͡sa] is a district of Kędzierzyn-Koźle, Opole Voivodeship, Poland, located in the western part of the city.

== Etymology ==
The name of the district is of Polish origin and comes from the word kłoda, which means "log".

== History ==
During the Third Silesian Uprising, on May 10, 1921, Polish insurgents captured Kłodnica from the Germans.

During World War II, the German government operated the E800 forced labour subcamp of the Stalag VIII-B/344 prisoner of war camp for Allied POWs in Kłodnica.

Kłodnica was included within the city limits of Kędzierzyn-Koźle as its district in 1975.
