= Grave of Silesian Insurgents in Krapkowice =

War memorial in Krapkowice

Grave of Silesian Insurgents
- Polish: Mogiła Powstańców Śląskich
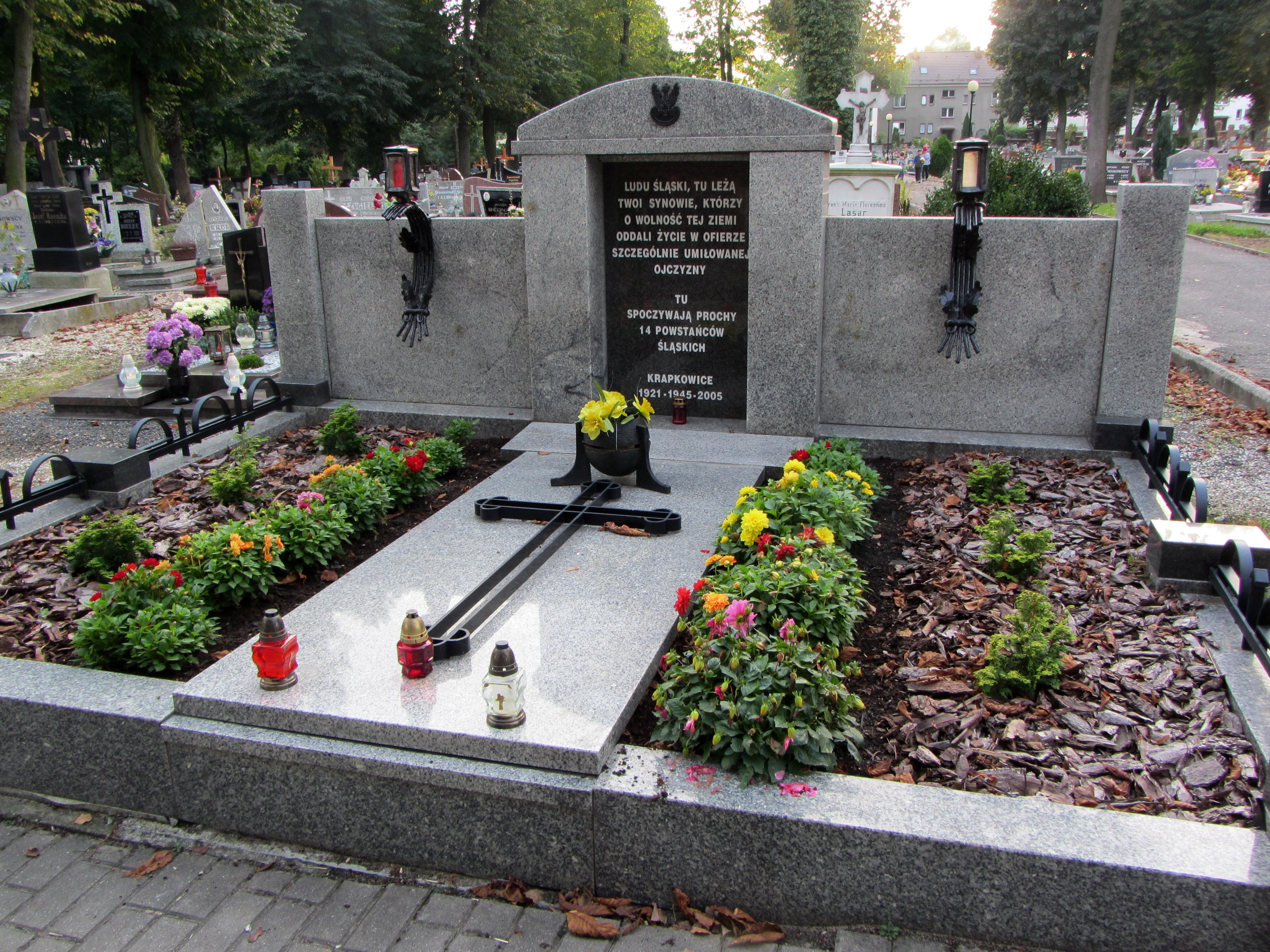
- The grave in September 2014.
- Location: Krapkowice, Poland
- Coordinates: 50°28′23″N 17°57′36″E
- Type: Grave
- Completion date: 1945
- Dedicated to: Silesian insurgents fallen in the Battle of Annaberg

The Grave of Silesian Insurgents (Polish: Mogiła Powstańców Śląskich), situated in the municipal cemetery in Krapkowice, is a mass grave of Silesian Insurgents fallen in the Battle of Annaberg during the Third Silesian Uprising in 1921.

== History ==
In 1945, an exhumation was carried out of the remains of Silesian insurgents buried in an unmarked grave dating back to 1921 at the cemetery in Krapkowice. A new mass grave was established to the left of the main entrance of the municipal cemetery by Staszica Street; becoming the final resting place for the remains of 14 Silesian insurgents who perished during the German offensive on St. Anne's Mountain in May 1921, in the Battle of Annaberg during the Third Silesian Uprising. That same year, in 1945, a stone monument was erected at the site to commemorate the fallen insurgents.

On 22 June 1987, the grave was entered into the register of historic monuments of the Opole Voivodeship. In 2005, the monument was renovated. In the process, the inscription on it was altered. The grave is included in the official list of sites required to visit in order to receive a commemorative PTTK badge celebrating the 100th anniversary of the Silesian Uprisings. Per tradition, ahead of All Saints' Day, the monument is tended to by the pupils of the Public Primary School No. 1 in Krapkowice.

== Description ==
The Grave of Silesian Insurgents is located in the municipal cemetery by Staszica Street in Krapkowice, to the left of the cemetery’s entrance gate. The grave is bordered with a lower step in the center. During renovations in 2005 a tombstone made of grey granite was installed on the grave, consisting of three parts: two rectangular slabs on the sides, as well as a tall central part—a rectangular pedestal topped with a semicircular arch featuring an interwar-era eagle emblem. On the central slab of the tombstone, there is a black plaque bearing the inscription:

Inscription (Polish)

LUDU ŚLĄSKI, TU LEŻĄ
TWOI SYNOWIE, KTÓRZY
O WOLNOŚĆ TEJ ZIEMI
ODDALI ŻYCIE W OFIERZE
SZCZEGÓLNIE UMIŁOWANEJ
OJCZYZNY

TU
SPOCZYWAJĄ PROCHY
14 POWSTAŃCÓW
ŚLĄSKICH

KRAPKOWICE
1921 – 1945 – 2005

Translation (English)

SILESIAN PEOPLE, HERE LIE
YOUR SONS, WHO,
FOR THE FREEDOM OF THIS LAND,
GAVE THEIR LIVES IN SACRIFICE
[FOR THEIR] ESPECIALLY BELOVED
HOMELAND

HERE
REST THE ASHES
[OF] 14 SILESIAN
INSURGENTS

KRAPKOWICE
1921 – 1945 – 2005
