= Góra Świętej Anny Landscape Park =

Protected area in Poland

- Park Krajobrazowy Góra Świętej Anny
- IUCN category V (protected landscape/seascape)
- Location within Poland
- Location: Opole Voivodeship, Poland
- Coordinates: 50.4558°N 18.173°E
- Area: 50.50 km^{2} (19.50 sq mi)
- Established: 1988

Góra Świętej Anny Landscape Park (Park Krajobrazowy Góra Świętej Anny) is a protected area (Landscape Park) in south-western Poland, established in 1988, covering an area of 50.50 square kilometres (19.50 sq mi).

The Park lies within Opole Voivodeship: in Krapkowice County (Gmina Gogolin, Gmina Zdzieszowice) and Strzelce County (Gmina Strzelce Opolskie, Gmina Leśnica). It is centred on and named after the village of Góra Świętej Anny and the hill of the same name (St Anne's hill).

Within the Landscape Park are six nature reserves.
