= Teasdale (disambiguation) =

Teasdale is a surname.

Teasdale may also refer to:

- Teasdale, Mississippi, United States
- Teasdale, Utah, United States
- Teasdale Corrie, an Antarctic cirque about 1,600 ft north-northeast of Cinder Spur
- Armstrong Teasdale based in St. Louis, Missouri, one of the state’s largest law firms
