= Góra Świętej Anny =

Góra Świętej Anny Sankt Annaberg
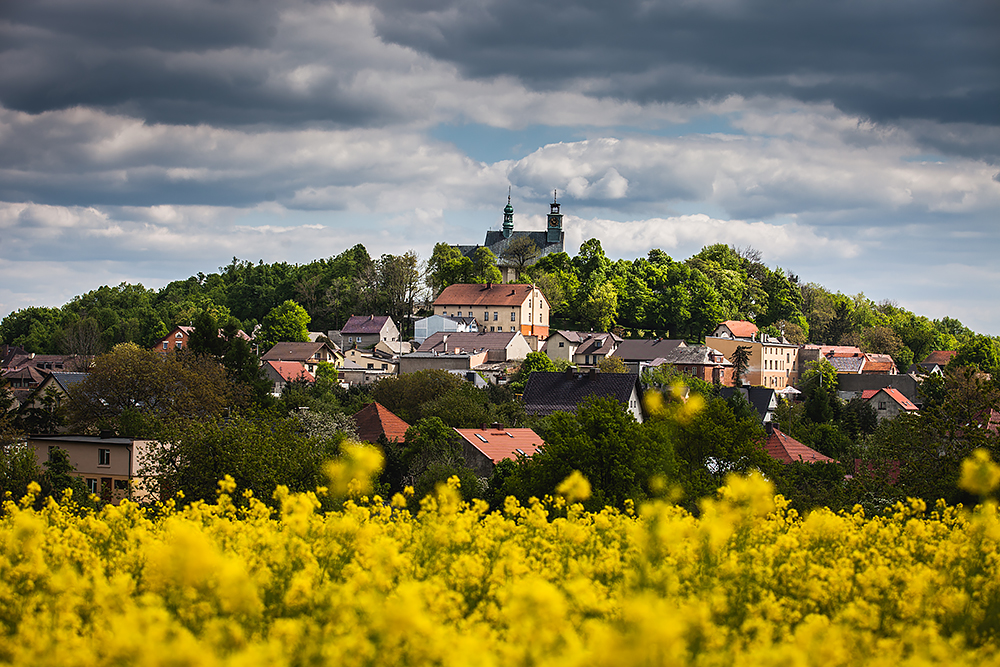
- A church overlooking the village

- Location within Poland
- Coordinates: 50°27′22″N 18°10′03″E
- Country: Poland
- Voivodeship: Opole
- County: Strzelce
- Gmina: Leśnica

Population (2006)
  - Total: 580
- Time zone: UTC+1 (CET)
  - Summer (DST): UTC+2 (CEST)
- Postal code: 47-154
- Area code: +48 77
- Car plates: OST

Góra Świętej Anny (Polish: [ˈɡura ˈɕfʲɛntɛj ˈannɨ] meaning "Saint Anne's Mountain", additional name in German: Sankt Annaberg) is a village in the Opole Voivodeship, in southern Poland.

The village is located on the hill from which its name derives. A popular sanctuary, with a statue of Saint Anne and a calvary, is located on its top.

The settlement lies within the protected area called Góra Świętej Anny Landscape Park. This is also one of the official Polish Historical Monuments (Pomnik historii).

== History ==
Following World War I and the re-emergence of the sovereign Poland, while still part of the Weimar Republic, the hill was the site of the Battle of Annaberg in 1921 during the Silesian Uprisings. A museum dedicated to the uprising was opened in the village in 1961.

In 1940, during World War II, Germans expelled the Franciscans from the village. The Germans established and operated a forced labour camp for Poles, Jews and Soviet prisoners of war, another forced labour camp for Jewish women, and the E111 forced labour subcamp of the Stalag VIII-B/344 prisoner-of-war camp in the village. The village was eventually restored to Poland after the war in 1945.

== Main sights ==
- 15th-century church dedicated to Saint Anne
- 17th-century Franciscan monastery and museum
- Calvary from the 17th and 18th centuries with 33 chapels
- Lourdes grotto and monument of John Paul II
- Amphitheatre (Thingspiele) built in the abandoned limestone quarry in 1934-1938
- Granite monument of the Silesian Uprisings by Xawery Dunikowski, 1955
- Lime kiln, middle of the 19th century
- Geological natural reserve in the abandoned nephelinite and limestone quarry
- Museum of the Silesian Uprisings

== Gallery ==
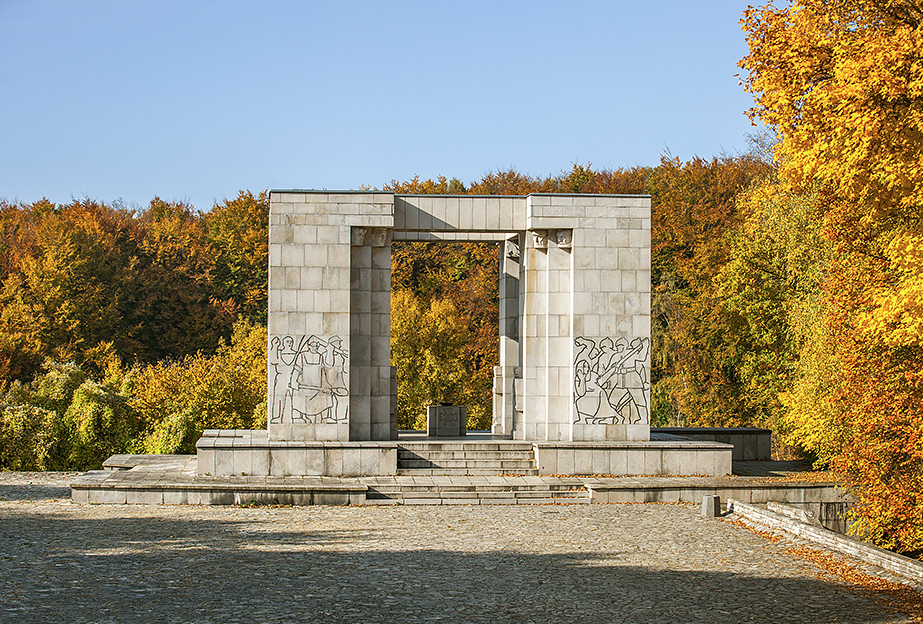
Silesian Uprisings monument

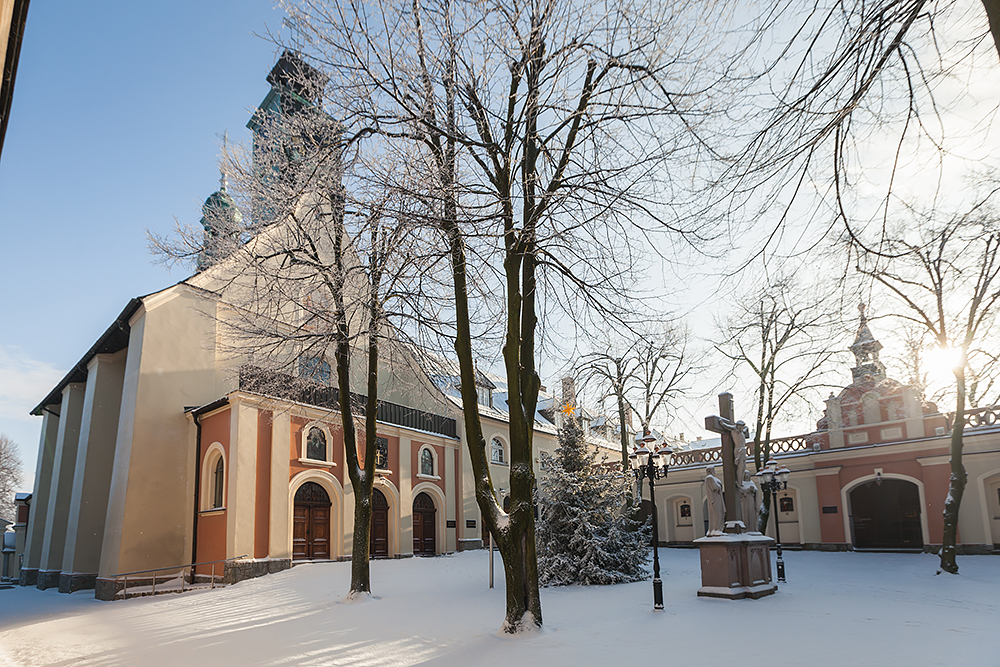
Saint Anne church

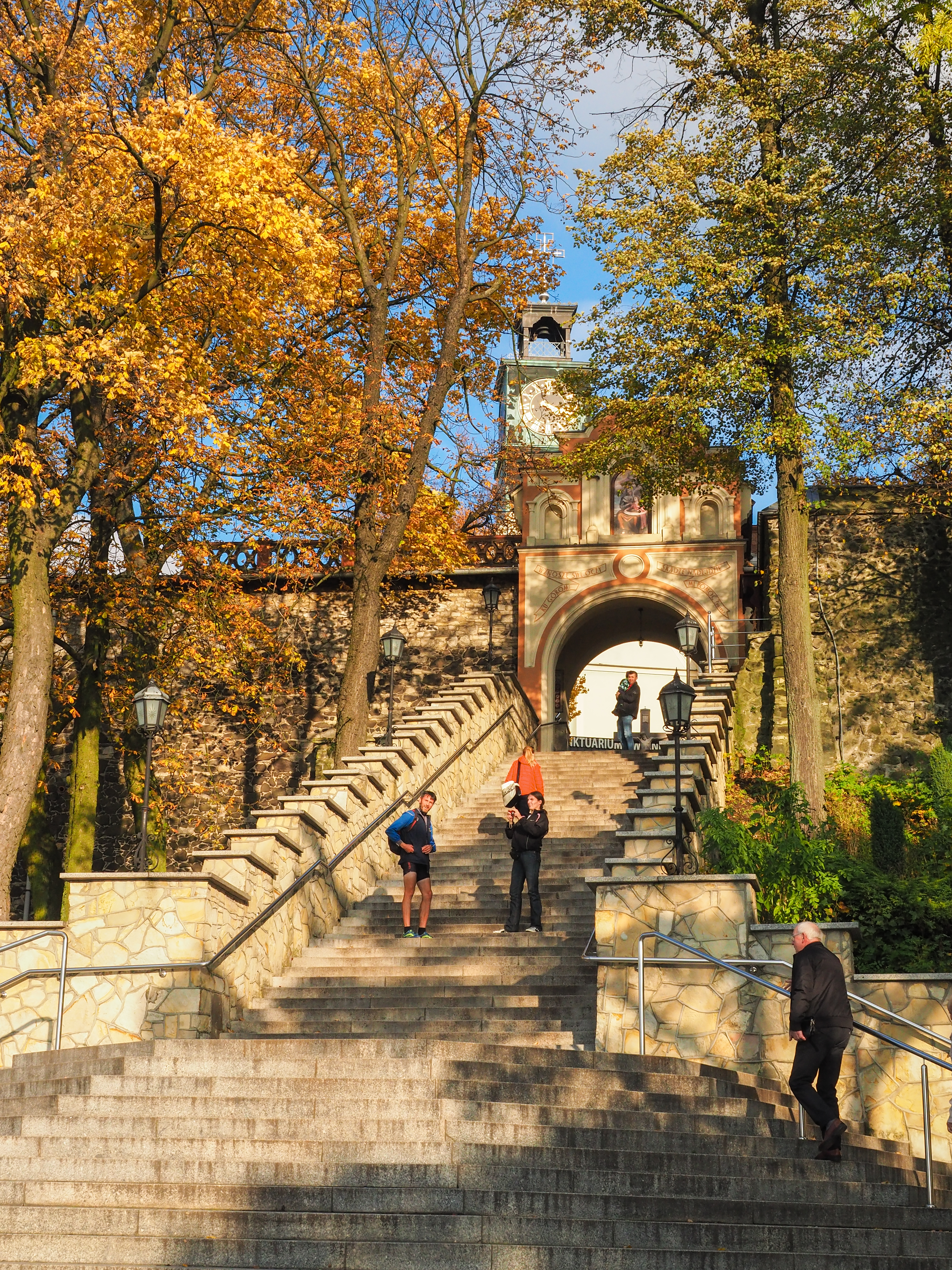
Monastery

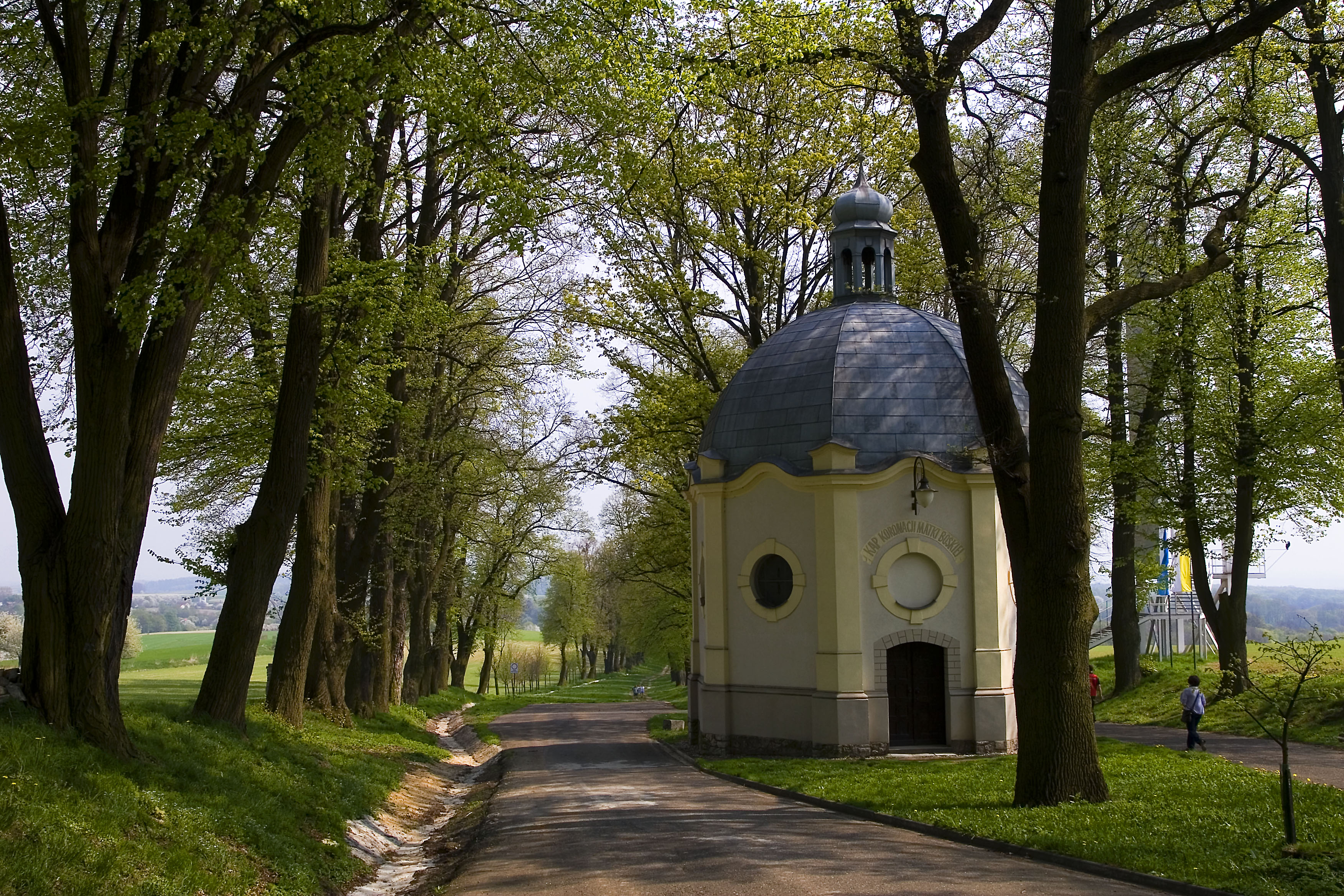
Chapel of the Coronation of Mary

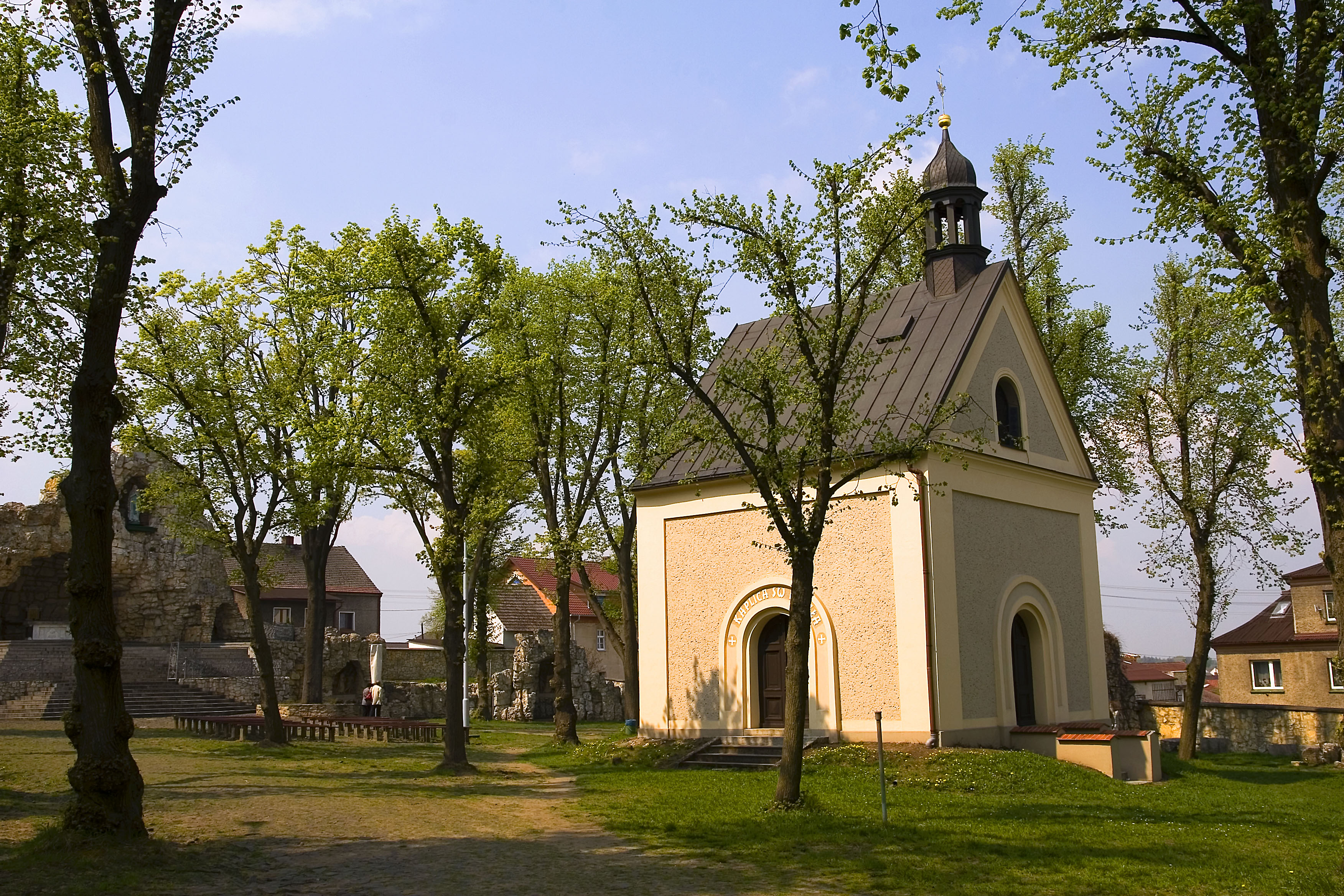
Chapel of St. Raphael

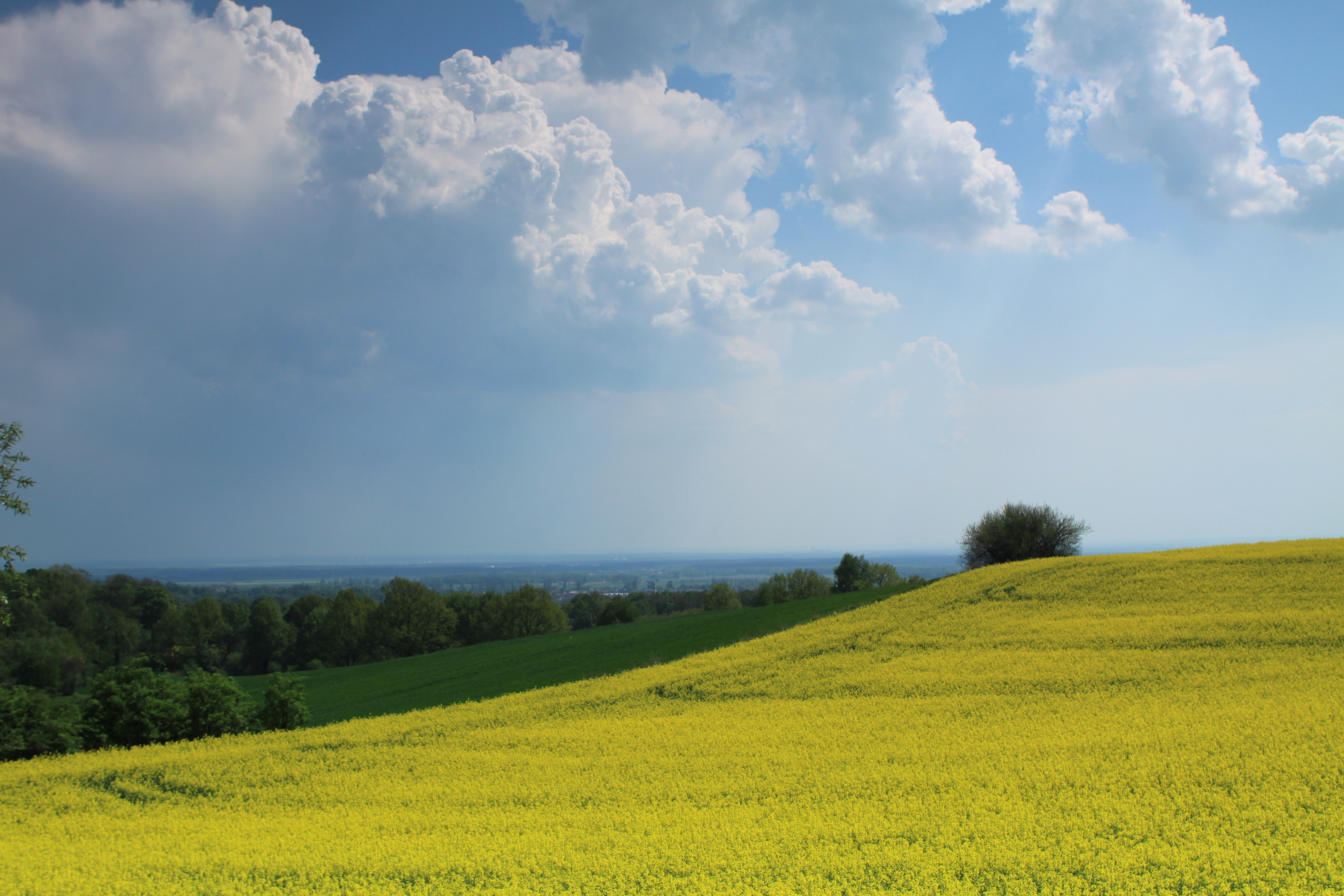
Landscape
