= Stamp Buttress =

Coordinates: 62°9′S 58°9′W

Stamp Buttress is an upstanding rocky headland forming the seaward termination of Dunikowski Ridge. Named for Sir Laurence Dudley Stamp (1898–1966), an English stratigrapher and geographer. He was Professor of Geology and Geography, University of Rangoon (1923–26), and Professor of Economic Geography at the London School of Economics (1926–1945). He is also the author of Britain's Structure and Scenery (1949).
