= Dunikowski Ridge =

Dunikowski Ridge (62°9′S 58°11′W) is a ridge trending northwest–southeast and rising to about 315 metres (1,030 ft) northeast of Legru Bay, King George Island, in the South Shetland Islands. It was named following geological work by the Polish Antarctic Expedition, 1977–79, after Xawery Dunikowski, the Polish sculptor.

== See also ==
- Stamp Buttress
