= Teasdale Corrie =

Teasdale Corrie (62°9′S 58°11′W) is a cirque about 2,000 ft east-west and 1,500 ft north-south, situated about 1,600 ft north-northeast of Cinder Spur, Antarctica. It is backed on its north flank by the high rocky crags of Dunikowski Ridge. The cirque, erroneously believed to be a volcanic vent, was exposed by recent glacial retreat. It contains a series of small lakes near the south margin, which are fed by seasonal meltwater. Named for Andrew Teasdale (b. 1966), British Antarctic Survey Field Assistant to Dr. J.L. Smellie for the duration of the January to April 1996 field season.
