= Bernhard von Hülsen =

German general (1865–1950)

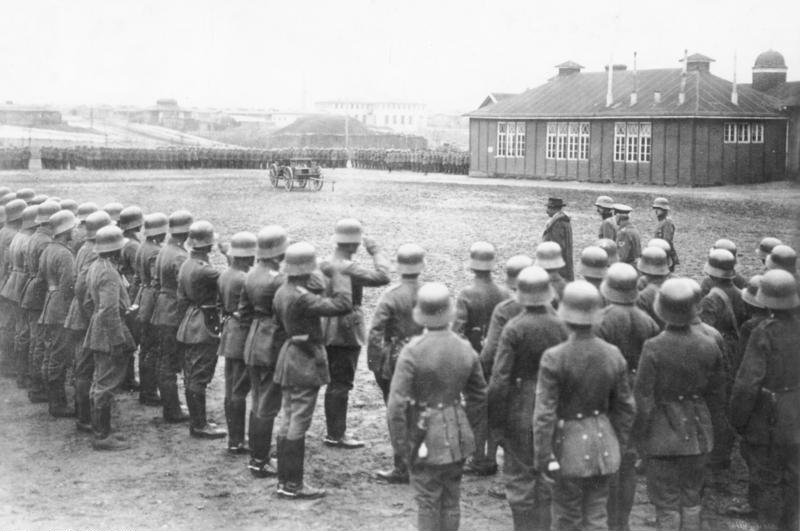
Reichswehrminister Gustav Noske visiting the Freikorps "von Hülsen" in January 1919

Bernhard Franz Karl Adolf Gottvertrau von Hülsen (b. 20 April 1865 in Cosel, Province of Silesia, Kingdom of Prussia, German Confederation; d. 21 April 1950 in Potsdam, State of Brandenburg, East Germany) was a German Generalleutnant.

== Life ==
Bernhard was the son of Prussian Lieutenant Colonel Karl Theodor Julius Ehregott Hermann von Hülsen (1816–1867) and his second wife (∞ Guhlen 13 July 1858) Helene Friederike Charlotte, née von Clausewitz. Walter von Hülsen (1863–1947), later General of the Infantry and Pour le Mérite knight, was his older brother, Heinrich-Hermann von Hülsen his nephew.

On 31 July 1896 in Berlin, 1st Lieutenant von Hülsen married his fiancée Magdalene Emilie Auguste Emma von Schaper (1866–1945) . They would have one son: Wolf Hermann Otto Jobbe Ehregott von Hülsen (1899–1973), who would also become an officer, finally Colonel of the Wehrmacht in WWII.

On 26 December 1918 after World War I, Hülsen formed the Freikorps (von) Hülsen, a paramilitary unit that participated in the suppression of the Spartacist League in Berlin. In 1921, Generalleutnant von Hülsen commanded units in the Battle of Annaberg in Upper Silesia. In 1922, he published Der Kampf um Oberschlesien.

== Awards and decorations ==
- Persian Order of the Lion and the Sun, Knight's Cross (PSuL5/PL5)
- Danish Order of the Dannebrog, Knight's Cross (DD3)
- Centenary Medal (Prussia) on 22 March 1897
- Order of the Red Eagle, 4th Class
- Saxon Albert Order, Knight's Cross 1st Class (SA3a)
- Military Merit Order (Bavaria), Knight's Cross 2nd Class (BMV3b)
  - 1905 reclassified as Military Merit Order, 4th Class (BMV4)
- Order of Osmanieh, 3rd Class (TO3)
- Crown to the Knight's Cross 1st Class of the Albrecht Order (SA3a.mKr)
- Order of Franz Joseph, Commander's Cross
  - later renamed Commander's Cross without Star (ÖFJ2b)
- Order of the Crown (Württemberg), Knight's Cross (WK3)
- Order of the Crown (Prussia), 3rd Class
- Spanish Cross of Military Merit, 2nd Class (SMV2)
- Swedish Order of the Sword, Knight's Cross 1st Class (SS3a)
- Prussian Service Award Cross for 25 years
- Order of the Red Eagle, 3rd Class with the Bow (mit der Schleife)
- Military Merit Order (Bavaria), Officer's Cross (BMV.O/BMVO)
- Baden Order of the Zähringer Lion, Commander 2nd Class (BZ2b)
- Iron Cross (1914), 2nd and 1st Class
- Order of the Red Eagle, 2nd Class with Oak Leaves and Swords on the War Ribbon on 22 January 1916
- Wound Badge (1918) in Black
- Silesian Eagle, 2nd and 1st Class with Oal Leaves and Swords
- Honour Cross of the World War 1914/1918 with Swords
