= Paweł Cyms =

Paweł Cyms (1894 - 1949) was a soldier of the Imperial German Army and captain of infantry in the Second Polish Republic. He fought in World War I, Greater Poland Uprising (1918–19), Silesian Uprisings, Invasion of Poland, and in the Home Army during World War II.

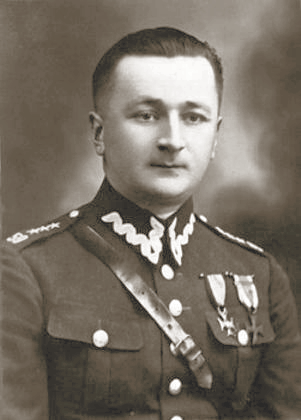
Paweł Cyms

Cyms was born on March 2, 1894, in the village of Pawłowo, which at that time was part of Province of Posen, German Empire. He was raised in a middle-class family. While attending a high school in Gniezno (Gnesen), he joined a secret Polish patriotic organization “Association of Tomasz Zan”. After graduation in 1914, he entered a seminary in Poznań (Posen), but did not complete his studies, as in 1915 he was drafted into the German Army. Cyms fought both on Western and Eastern fronts of WW1, also completing a cadet school at Biederitz. In 1917, he was promoted to the rank of Second lieutenant.

After returning to Provinz Posen, he joined Polish Military Organisation’s local office in Gniezno. He actively participated in the Greater Poland Uprising: with his unit, Cyms first liberated Gniezno, then other local towns, such as Trzemeszno, Mogilno, Strzelno and Kruszwica. Due to his skills, Polish rebels captured key rail junction of Inowrocław (Hohensalza), where Cyms created two infantry battalions, which were later named 1st and 2nd Regiments of Kujawy Grenadiers. His two brothers also fought in the insurrection. Adolf Cyms was killed in battle in 1919, while chaplain Leon Cyms survived and died in 1931.

In 1920, Paweł Cyms was promoted to Captain, and in early 1921, he was transferred to Upper Silesia, where he took over the post of military commandant of the area of Zabrze (Hindenburg O/S). He fought in the Third Silesian Uprising: his soldiers captured Bierawa and participated in the Battle of Annaberg.

After the uprising, Cyms briefly studied law, but in 1923 took the job at a Free City of Danzig’s branch of Warsaw’s Bank Handlowy. In 1928, he returned to military service, and was attached to 59th Greater Poland Infantry Regiment at Inowroclaw. In 1934, Cyms was transferred to the Second Department of Polish General Staff in Warsaw. Before this, in 1931, he married Maria née Krawczak (they had a daughter Barbara and a son, Janusz).

During the 1939 Invasion of Poland, Cyms was an officer of 80th Infantry Regiment. Transferred to 179th Infantry Regiment (50th Reserve Infantry Division), he fought in the Battle of Kock. Captured by the Germans, Cyms was sent to a POW camp at Radom. Released in late 1939, he was rearrested in 1940, and sent to a prison in Bielsko-Biała. He spent there 4 months, after which he lived in Krosno and Kalwaria Zebrzydowska (since May 1941). Cyms was an active soldier of the Home Army.

After the war, Cyms moved back to Gniezno. In 1948 he moved to Szczecin, where he worked at a shipping company “Polska Bandera”.

Cyms died on November 13, 1949, at Bystra near Bielsko-Biała. On December 21, 2013, his body was exhumed and moved with honors first to Inowrocław, and then to Gniezno (December 27). During a special service, attended by crowds of local residents and authorities, the coffin of Paweł Cyms was placed in a tomb located at the so-called “Acropolis of Heroes”, at Gniezno's Peter and Paul Cemetery.

== Awards and honors ==
- Silver Cross of the Virtuti Militari (1921),
- Cross of Independence with Swords,
- Cross of Valour (Poland), four times,
- Gold Cross of Merit (Poland),
- Commemorative Medal for the War of 1918 - 1921 (Medal Pamiatkowy za Wojne 1918–1921),
- Silesian Uprising Cross

== Sources ==
- Gąsiorowski Antoni (przew. kom.), Wielkopolski Słownik Biograficzny, Warszawa – Poznań 1981
