= Góra Świętej Anny (hill) =

Hill in Poland

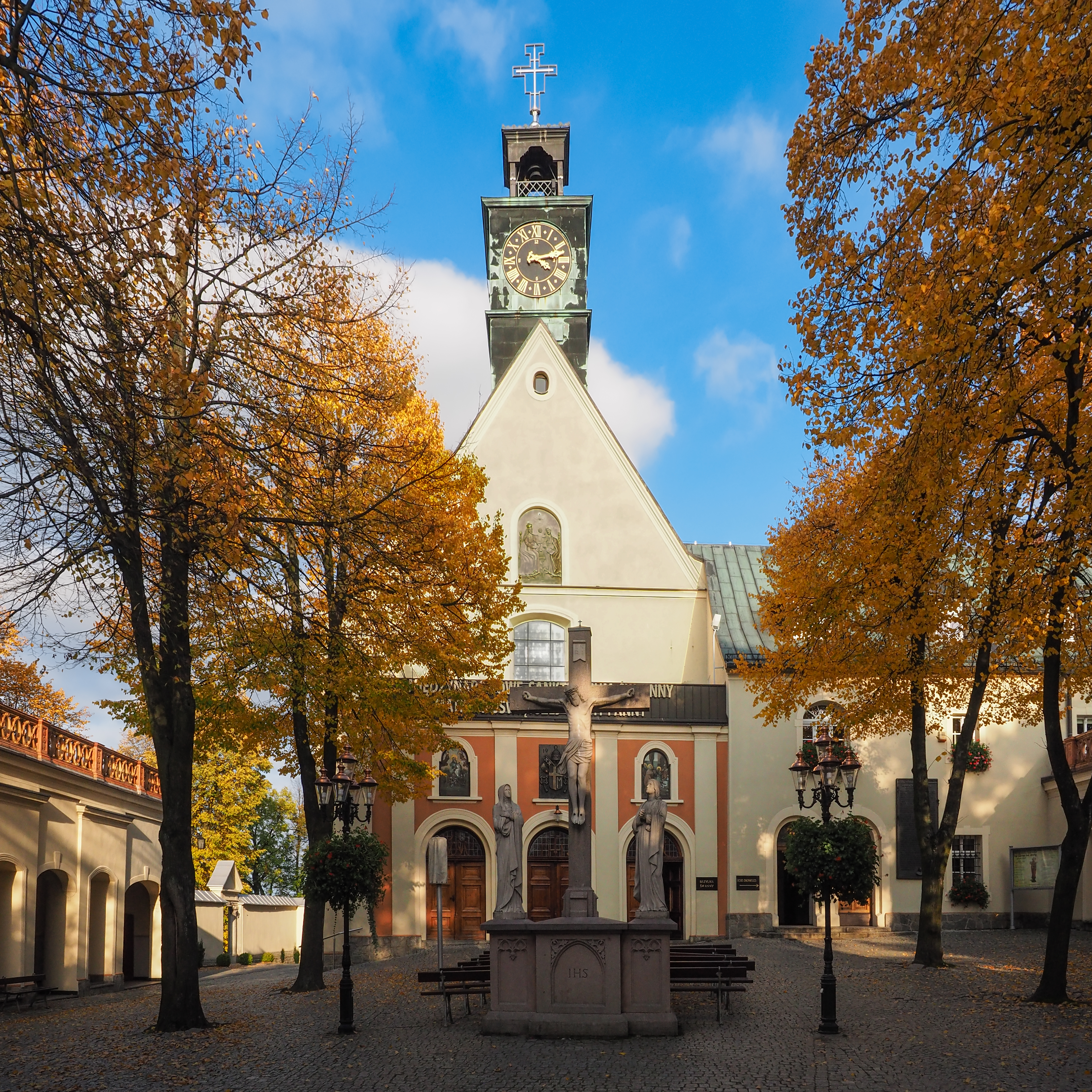
- Sanctuary

Highest point
- Elevation: 1,332 ft (406 m)
- Coordinates: 50°27′00″N 18°10′00″E

Geography
- Location within Poland Location within Opole Voivodeship
- Location: Poland

Geology
- Mountain type: Volcanic cone

Historic Monument of Poland
- Designated: 2004-04-14
- Part of: Góra Świętej Anny – Composed Cultural and Natural Landscape
- Reference no.: Dz. U. z 2004 r. Nr 102, poz. 1061

Góra Świętej Anny (Polish pronunciation: [ˈɡura ˈɕfʲɛntɛj ˈannɨ]) or St. Anne Mountain (German: St. Annaberg; Silesian: Świyntŏ Anna) is an inselberg in Upper Silesia, Poland, next to the community of the same name. It is the location of the Franciscan monastery with the miraculous statue of St. Anne and the imposing calvary, which is an important destination for Roman Catholic pilgrimage. The Composed Cultural and Natural Landscape of Góra Świętej Anny was announced one of Poland's official Historic Monuments (Pomnik historii) by the National Heritage Board and the President of Poland.

== Geology ==
The Annaberg is a volcanic cone of Tertiary basalt, the easternmost end of the Silesian volcanic belt and the easternmost occurrence of basalt in Europe. It is 406 metres (1,332 ft) high.

== History ==
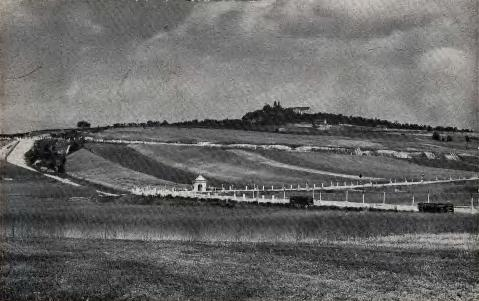
The Annaberg in 1934

The hill was a pagan shrine in pre-Christian times.

It was formerly known as the Chelmberg; around 1100 a wooden chapel to St. George was built on the hill, and it became known as the Georgenberg (St. George's hill). In 1516 the noble family of von Gaschin, who had moved to Silesia from Poland in the mid-15th century, erected a church dedicated to St. Anne on the Chelmberg. The hill became a popular pilgrimage destination, especially after the donation in 1560 of a wooden statue of St. Anne, containing relics, which is still in the church today.

Count Melchior Ferdinand von Gaschin wanted to make the hill the seat of Franciscans, and during the Swedish-Polish War, the order decided to close its houses in Kraków and Lwów and move to Silesia for safety, and an agreement was made under which they would take over the church on the Annaberg. 22 Franciscans moved there on 1 November 1655. The count had a simple wooden monastery building built and replaced the church with a new stone building which was dedicated on 1 April 1673. The church attracted increasing numbers of pilgrims and led to the hill's becoming known as St. Anne's hill. In addition to pilgrims' hostels and other infrastructure, in the 19th century, three publishing firms were established to serve the needs of pilgrims, by Franz Gielnik, Michael Rogier and Adolf Marcyago. In 1864, 400,000 pilgrims visited the church.

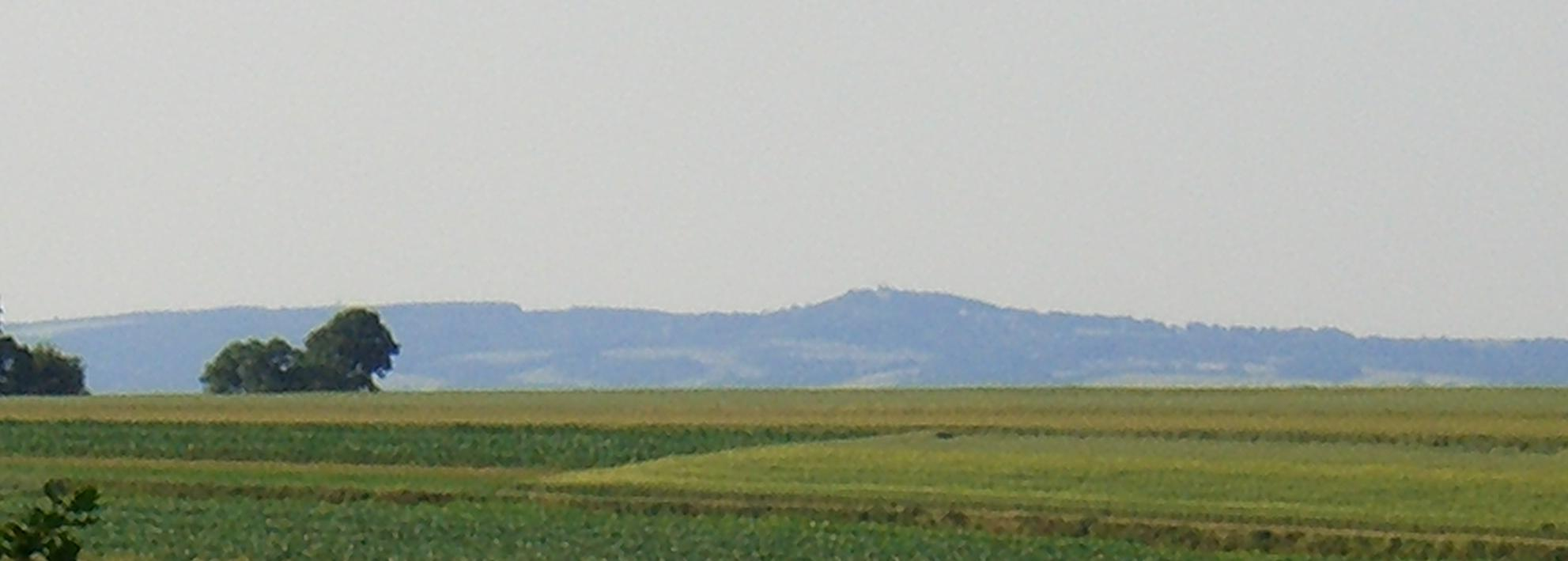
Góra Świętej Anny viewed from the south at a distance of about 25 km

After the First World War, a plebiscite was held on 20 March 1921 under the terms of the Treaty of Versailles to determine whether the parts of Silesia which had belonged to Prussia and thus to the German Empire would remain German or join the reconstituted Poland. In the parish of Annaberg, as in most of Upper Silesia, a majority voted for Germany, but the local administrative district (Landkreis Groß Strehlitz) was one of the areas where the majority favoured reunion with Poland. In early May the Third Silesian Uprising began, with Polish units of the Wawelberg Group, against the wishes of the Polish government, seeking to unite with Poland those areas that had voted for it. On 4 May they captured the Annaberg, which in addition to the cultural importance of the monastery for German Silesians, had strategic importance since it dominates the Oder valley, from the legally limited forces of the German army. On 21–23 May, in the Battle of Annaberg, unofficial German forces of the Upper Silesian Selbstschutz and the Bavarian Freikorps Oberland, under the command of Generalleutnant Bernhard von Hülsen, retook part of the hill. There were heavy losses on both sides and fighting took place in several neighbouring villages. Several participants on the German side were later prominent in the Nazi regime.

With the battle added to its existing role symbolising the Catholic identity of Silesia within predominantly Protestant Prussia, the Annaberg became a powerful symbol of German regional nationalism; it features in this role in the 1927 propaganda film Land unterm Kreuz. It also had religious and cultural importance for Polish Silesians; it was the subject of a poem by Norbert Bonczyk; and after the 1921 battle, also became a political symbol for Poles.

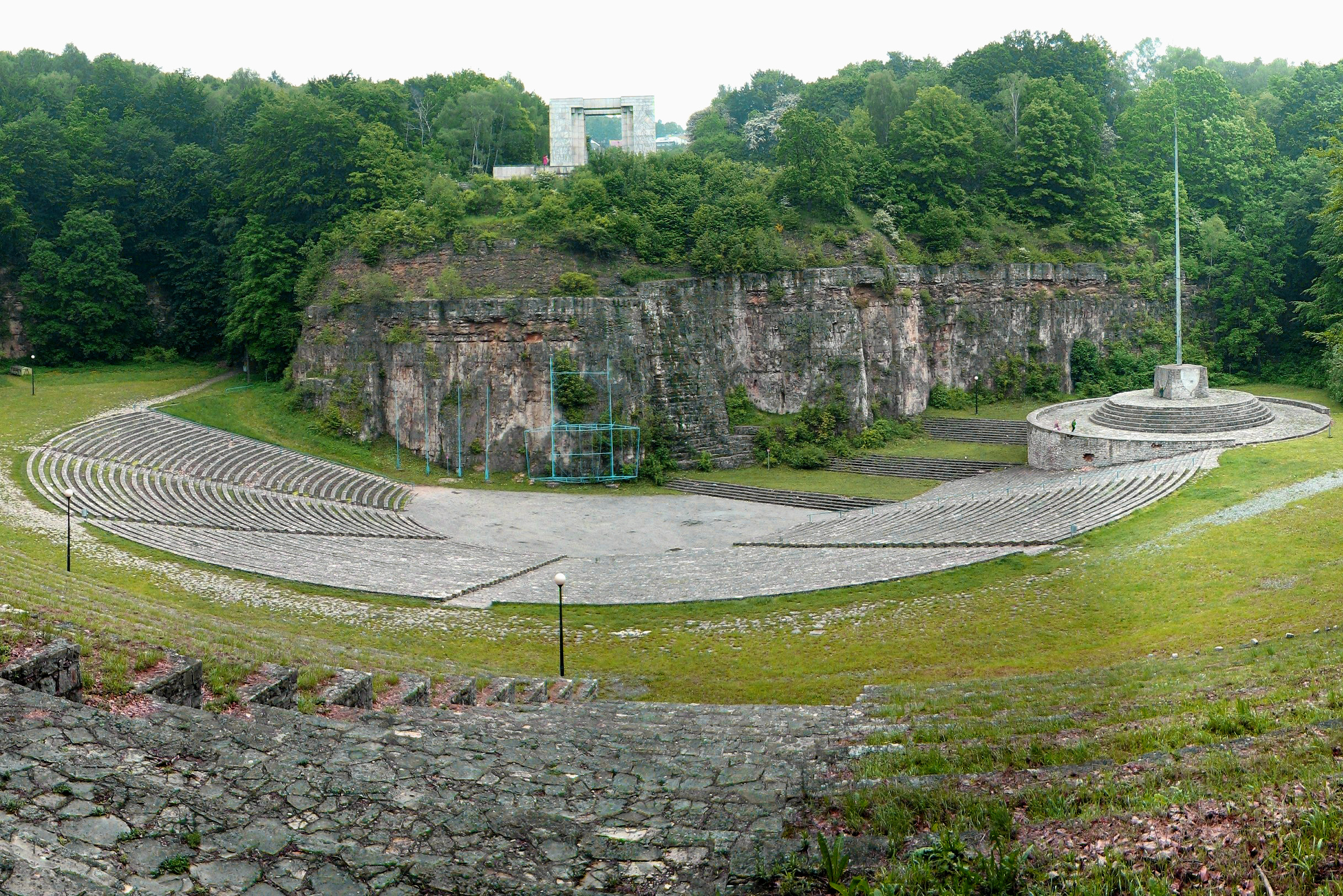
View of the Amphitheatre with Monument to the Polish Silesian Uprisings at the top

In 1934–1936, the Nazis built a Thingstätte on the site of a quarry at the base of the hill. In 1936–1938, a mausoleum for 51 fallen members of the German Freikorps, designed by Robert Tischler, was erected overlooking this, and a rest stop provided from which users of the new Reichsautobahn (today the Polish A4 autostrada) could take a 10-minute walk to visit the monument. The intent was for the complex of mausoleum and theatre to be a counter to the monastery and "transform the Annaberg into the symbol of Upper Silesia and an appropriate site of religious and national celebration". However, after its inauguration in May 1938, the theatre was not used again for ceremonies, while pilgrims continued to visit the monastery in ever increasing numbers.

The mausoleum was dynamited in 1945 and in 1955 was replaced by a monument to the Silesian rebels, designed by Xawery Dunikowski.

The monks have been expelled from the monastery three times, under Napoleon (in 1810; pilgrims brought their own priests with them and the Franciscans did not return until 1859), Bismarck, and Hitler. When they returned in 1945, they did not reinstate German-language services at the church until June 1989. Helmut Kohl had intended to attend a service there during his reconciliation tour of Poland in November 1989 from which he was recalled by the fall of the Berlin Wall on 9 November. (This was regarded as an unfortunate choice and Kohl was instead taken to Helmut von Moltke's estate, where a chaotic mass in Polish took place with members of the German minority attempting to sing hymns to St. Anne.) The monastery today draws thousands of pilgrims every year, particularly from Upper Silesia itself and especially for St. Anne's Day, 26 July, and for the Catholic Church is a symbol of piety that transcends national boundaries. In March 1980, Pope John Paul II declared the church a minor basilica.

On 14 April 2004, the Annaberg was declared a Polish historic monument.

== Monuments ==
=== Monastery ===
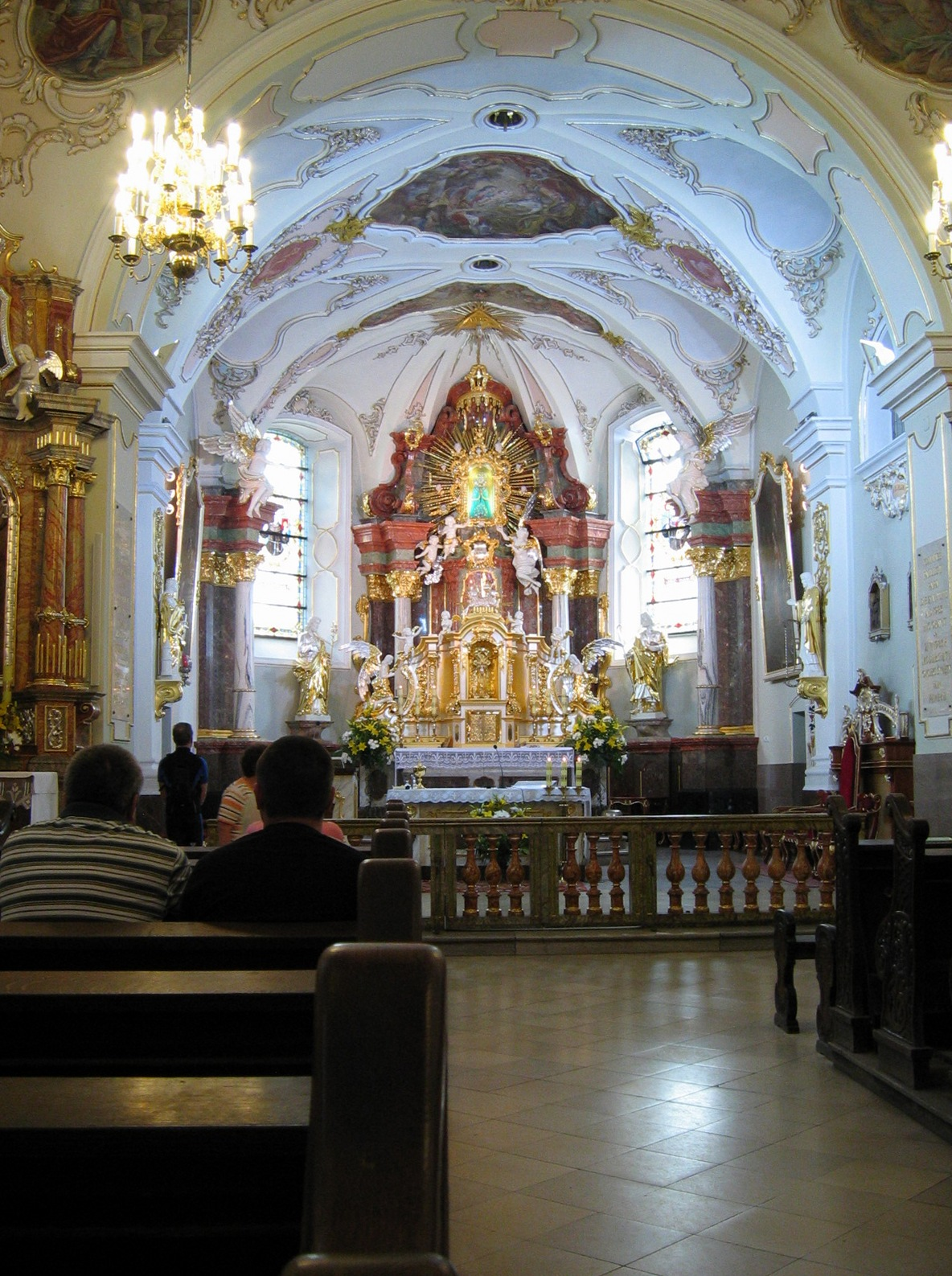
Interior of the monastery church

The monastery buildings, at the top of the hill, are Baroque; the church was rebuilt in 1665 and the other buildings, which form a quadrangle on its south side, date to 1733–49. The main object of veneration by the pilgrims is a statue of St. Anne with the Virgin and Child carved out of lime wood above the main altar in the church, about 66 centimetres (26 in) tall, which supposedly contains relics of the saint from the monastery of Ville near Lyon in France and is credited with miracles. It is said to have been donated to the church by Nikolaus von Kochtitzky, a local nobleman, in 1560, and is dressed in cloth of gold with pearls.

Outside the church is the Paradiesplatz (Paradise Square), a formal monastery garden laid out in 1804. Below the monastery there is a Calvary (a path between stations of the Passion of Christ) with 33 Baroque chapels as stations. This was specified in the will of Count Melchior Ferdinand von Gaschin, who thought the landscape of the Annaberg resembled that of Jerusalem and its surroundings; it was constructed under his nephew, Georg Adam von Gaschin, in 1700–09 to designs by Domenico Signo and partly rebuilt in 1764 and again in 1780–85, when the Holy Stairs were added to designs by Christoph Worbs. Georg Adam and Anton von Gaschin are buried in the crypt of the Cross Chapel and depicted larger than life on its central columns. In 1912 the Lourdes Grotto was added.

=== Amphitheatre ===
The Thingstätte or open-air theatre for Thingspiele, Nazi multi-disciplinary performances, was built in 1934–36, the first in Silesia. It was designed by Franz Böhmer and Georg Pettich and had seats for 7,000, standing room for 20,000, and the capacity to hold up to 50,000. Since the war it has been used for harvest festivals and concerts and attempts have been made to fund restoration, but in 2008 the stonework was in serious disrepair.

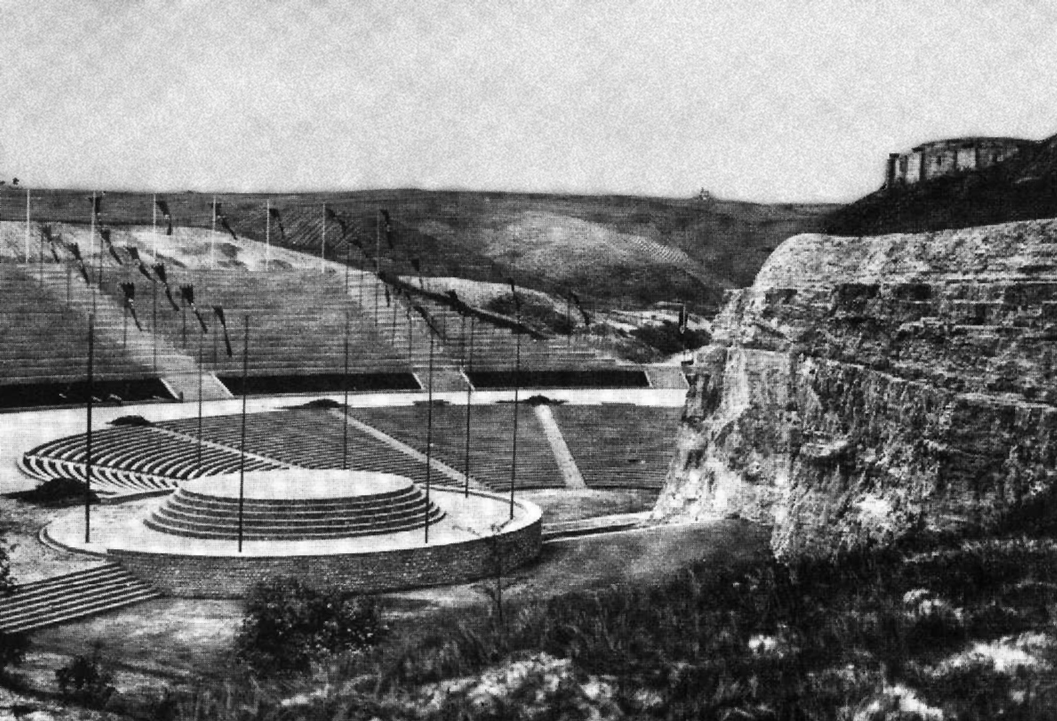
The theatre and mausoleum in a Nazi-era photograph

=== Mausoleum ===
In 1936–38, a mausoleum for the 51 Freikorps members who had died in the Battle of Annaberg was added at the top of the cliff above the amphitheatre. It was designed by Robert Tischler, chief architect for the German War Graves Commission, in military style, recalling a medieval fortress such as the Hohenstaufen Castel del Monte. One writer at the time compared it to a gun turret. It was circular, with heavy columns of rusticated sandstone surmounted by eternal flames, and a narrow entrance leading to an ambulatory lit only by narrow windows reminiscent of gun-slits, while on the other side a dark stairway suggestive of passage between worlds led down into the crypt cut out of the rock. Niches contained sarcophagi labelled with stages in the military history of Germany from 1914 to "1931/32: Deutschland erwache!" (Germany, awake!), and in the centre was a statue of a fallen warrior in green porphyry, by Fritz Schmoll known as Eisenwerth, which the sculptor and his assistants had created in place during construction of the monument because it would have been too large to bring through the entrance. A cupola admitted diffused light, and predominantly gold mosaics by Rössler of Dresden and Klemm of Munich depicted stylised German eagles and swastikas. A 1938 description in a publication of the War Graves Commission described the dead there as "keep[ing] watch on the border and encourag[ing] the border region and its people to preserve German character and German faith" and pointed out the location midway between the Hindenburg monument at Tannenberg and the monuments in the Königsplatz in Munich. The surroundings of the monument were made a nature preserve, and to complete their pilgrimage, visitors had to walk up from the level of the theatre through the natural environment.

Tischler designed several monuments in a similar somewhat rustic style reminiscent both of medieval fortresses and of the Hindenburg monument.

=== Monument to the uprising ===
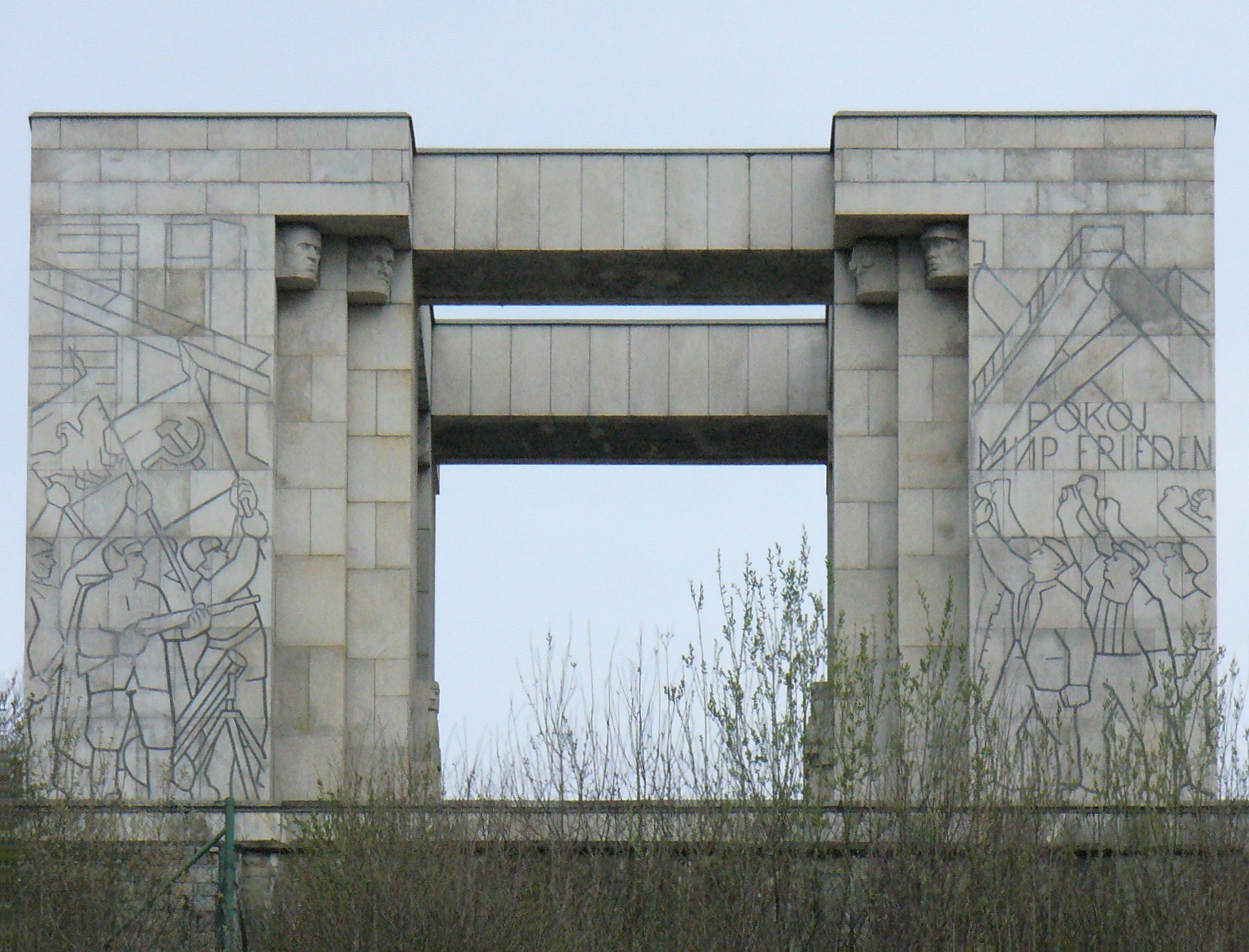
Monument to the insurgents, photographed in 2007

The mausoleum was dynamited in 1945 and in 1955 a monument to the Silesian insurgents (Polish: Pomnik Czynu Powstańczego), designed by Xawery Dunikowski, was dedicated in its place on the tenth anniversary of the liberation. This is a simple classical design with four pillars in rectangular section surrounding an eternal flame and supporting architraves, under which are four massive granite sculptures of "Silesian heads". There are industrial symbols on the gables. On the inside, the pillars are decorated with stylised depictions of miners, Silesian peasants, ironworkers, and a mother with a child on her arm in the manner of caryatids, while the exterior surfaces have drawings outlined in lead of everyday and work scenes from the present and the past and scenes of the uprising itself. These included conflicts with the Germans since the medieval period of the Teutonic Knights, implying eternal enmity between Germans and Poles, and for the 25th anniversary of the uprising in 1946, urns containing ashes of people killed by the Nazis in the Warsaw Uprising had been interred there. However, by 1955 the anti-German message was overshadowed by the message of praise for the forerunners of the Communist state.

Dunikowski had already sketched ideas for the monument in early 1946, and won a contest to design it, but he was less expert as an architect than as a sculptor and was under official pressure, and the building does not have the intended impressive effect.

== Gallery ==
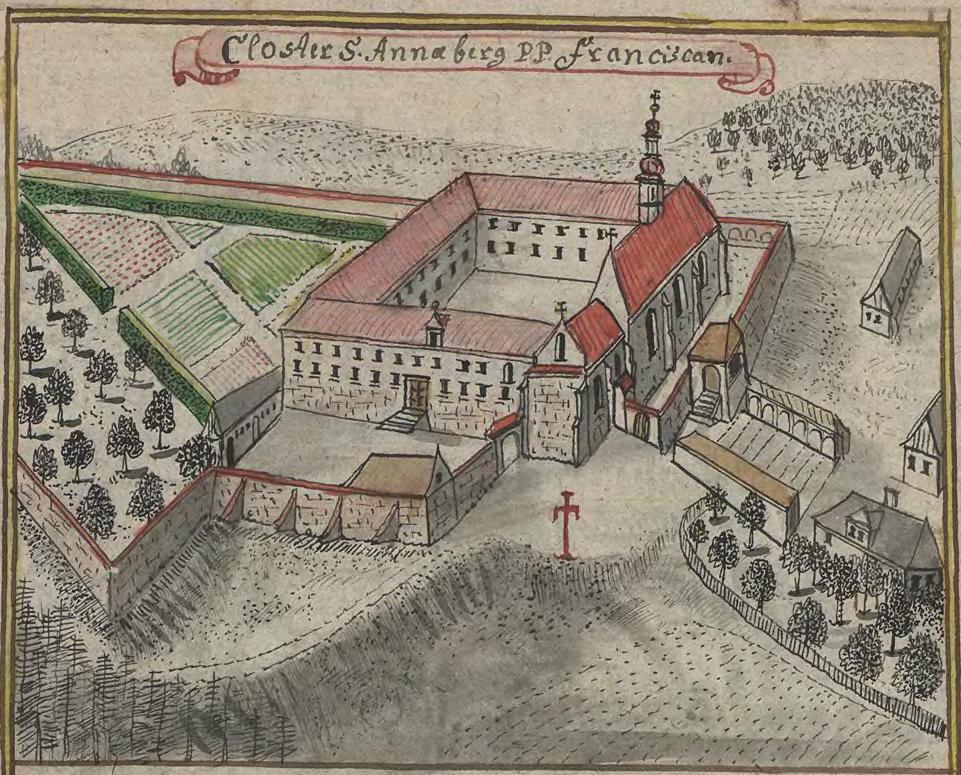
18th-century depiction of the Franciscan monastery

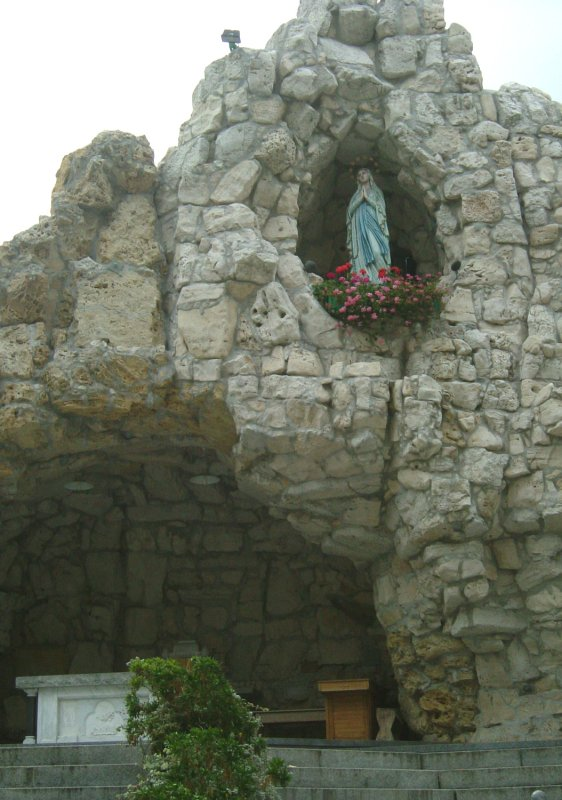
Lourdes Grotto

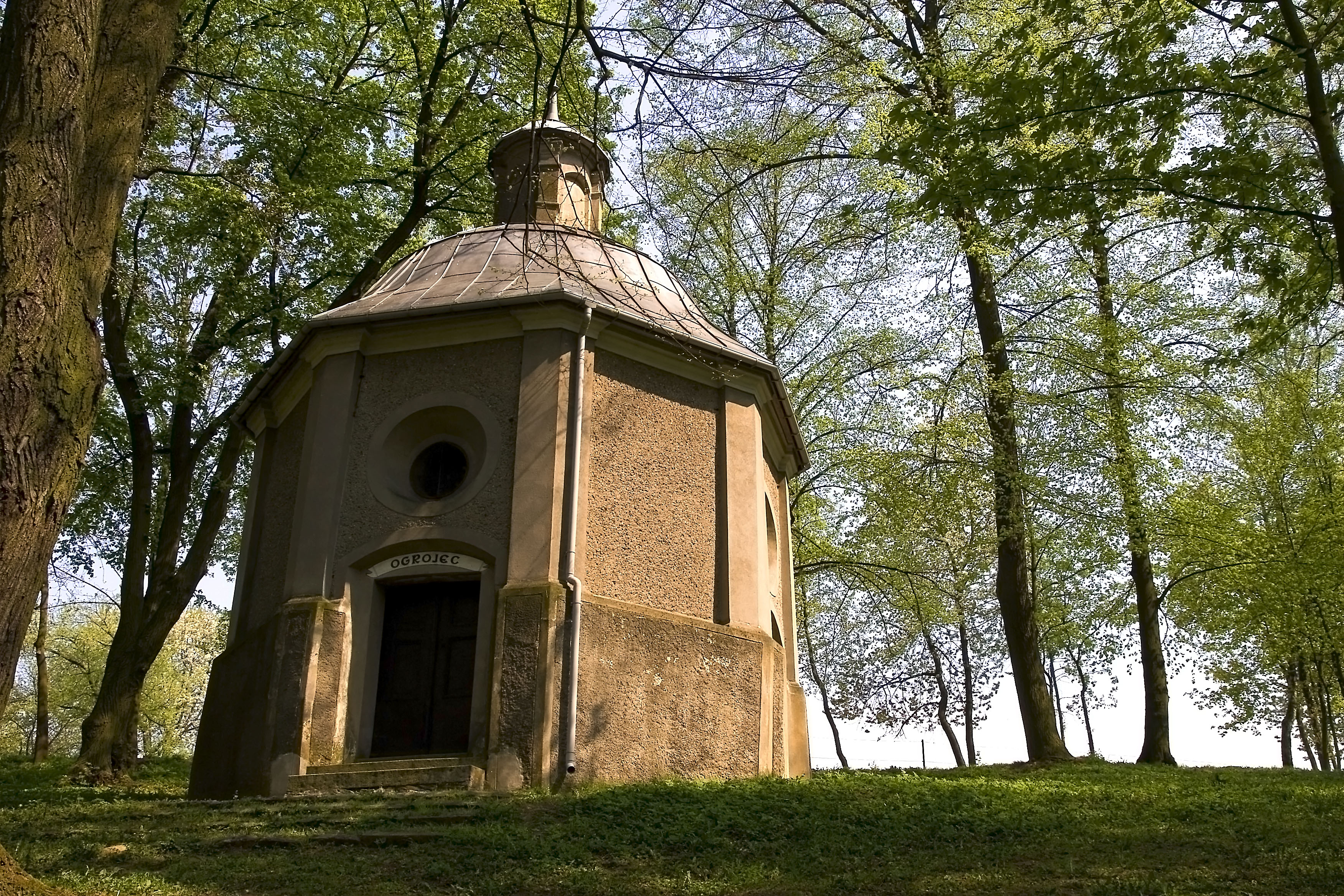
Chapel of Gethsemane in the Calvary

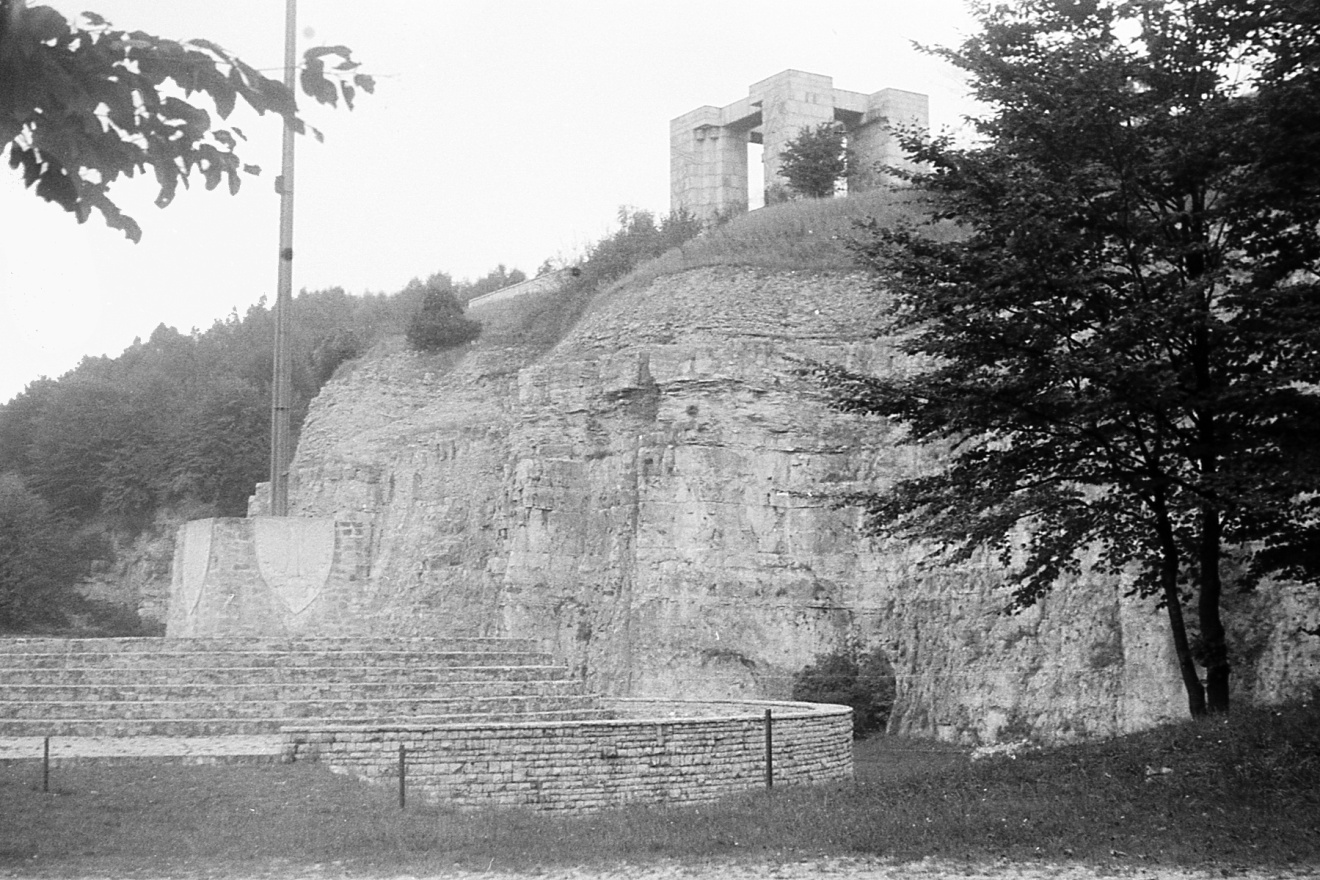
Monument to the Uprising seen from the Amphitheatre

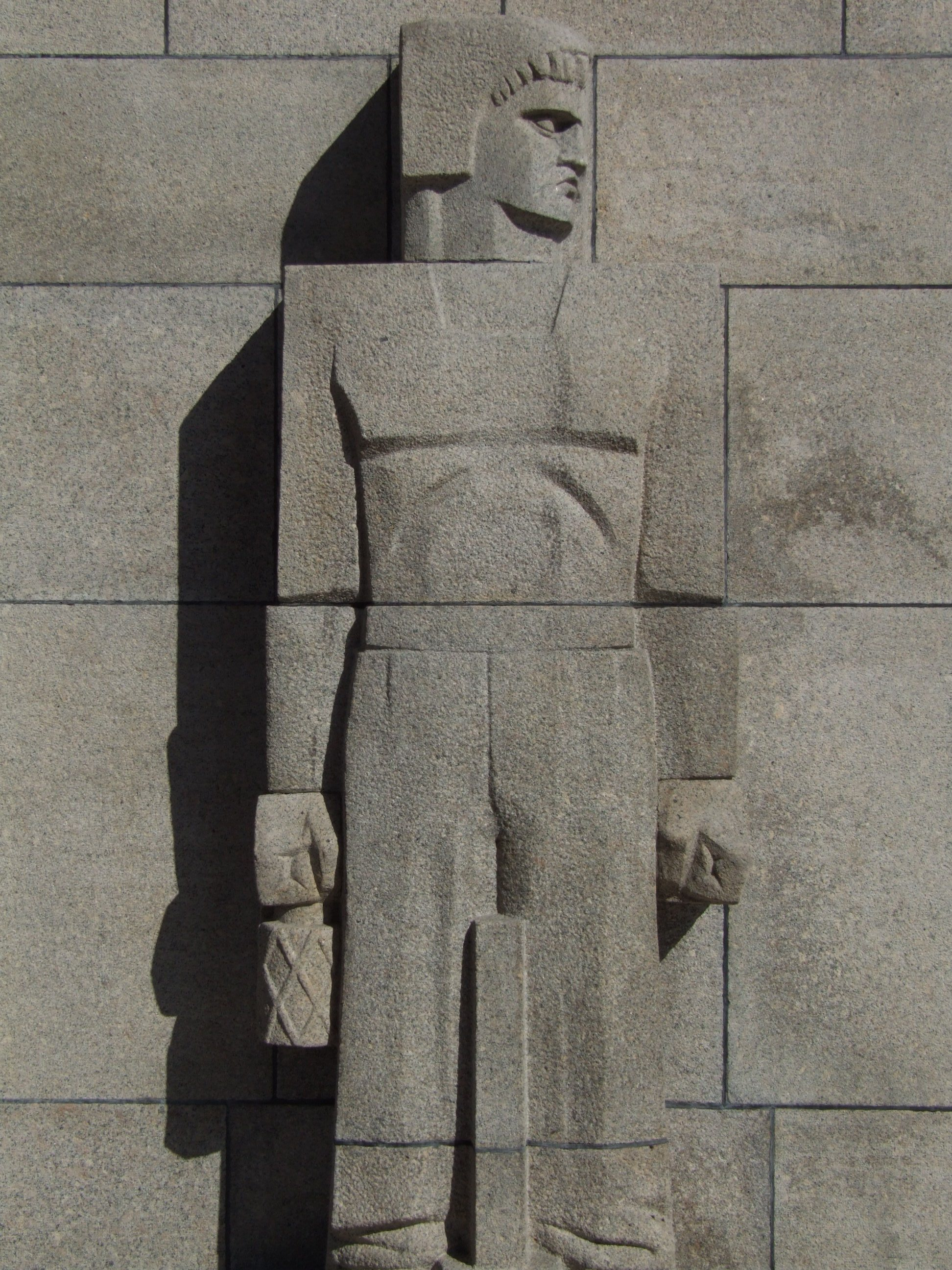
Sculpture of a miner by Xawery Dunikowski in the Monument
