= Silesian Eagle =

Silesian Eagle Schlesischer Adler
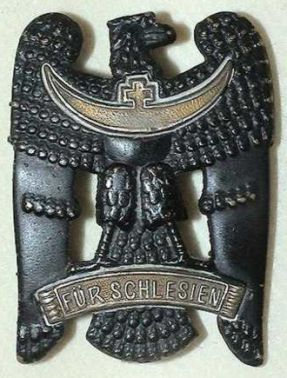
- Silesian Eagle 1st class
- Awarded for: Awarded to Silesian Uprisings members for service against the Poles
- Eligibility: Military personnel
- Campaign: Silesian Uprisings
- Status: Obsolete
- Established: 19 June 1919

The Silesian Eagle (German language: Schlesischer Adler; Silesian: Ślōnski adler) was a medal awarded to members of the German right-wing paramilitary group Freikorps Oberland for three or six months of service, as well as for fighting during the Silesian Uprisings during the Weimar Republic.

Instituted on 19 June 1919 by VI Armee-Korps Generalleutnant Friedrich von Friedeburg, the award was given in two classes: 2nd class for three months of service and 1st class for 6 months of service. Following the Freikorps' participation at the Battle of Annaberg, it was also awarded with oak leaves, swords, or both. This medal was one of the few Freikorps awards that were allowed to be worn on uniforms after the Wehrmacht banned unofficial medals in 1935. However, the swords and oak leaves were banned, but despite interdictions, many veterans continued wearing them in active military service in Nazi Germany. The crossed swords were added to recognize outstanding bravery in combat, while the oak leaf wreath was added to recognize additional non-combat merit. Professor Theodor von Gosen designed the badges. The badge was unofficial, and veterans had to purchase it themselves. The obverse inscription reads "For Silesia", in German.
