= Battle of Annaberg =

1921 battle of the Third Silesian Uprising

- Part of Silesian Uprisings
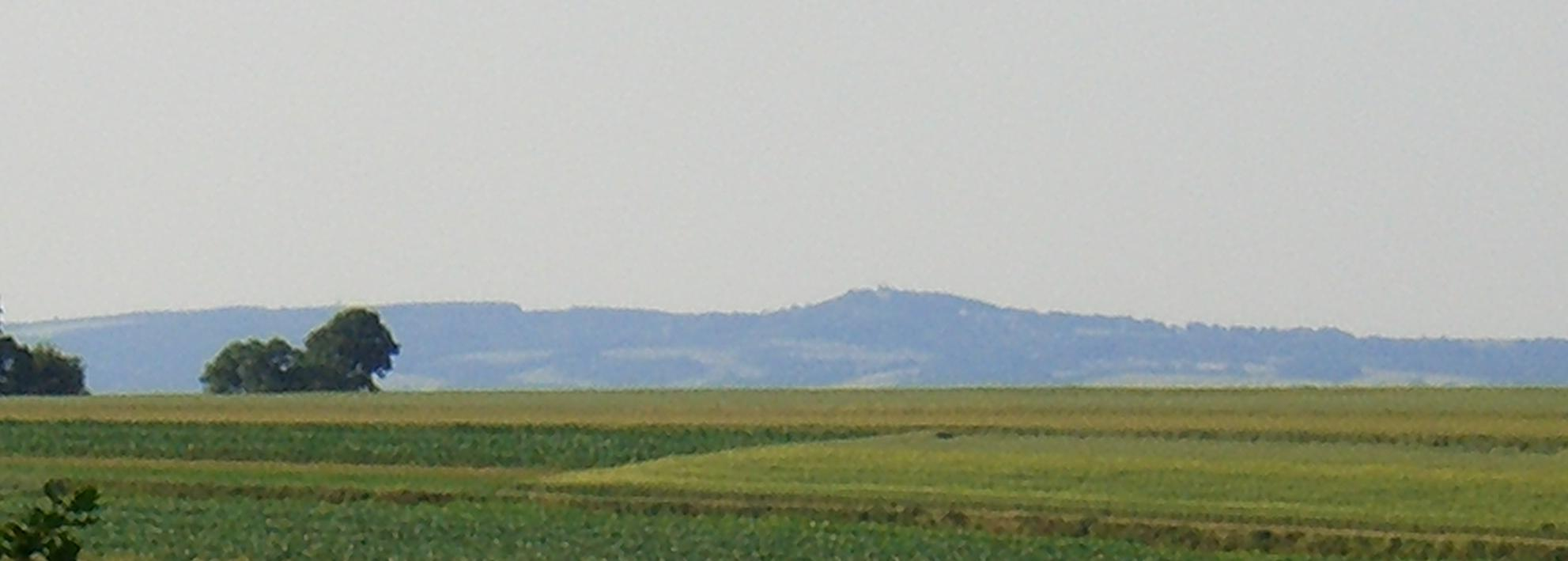
- Góra Świętej Anny (Annaberg) from the south
Date	May 21–26, 1921
Location	Annaberg, near Annaberg O.S., Upper Silesia, Germany 50°27′22″N 18°10′08″E
Result	Inconclusive

Belligerents
Polish insurgents	(Weimar Republic) Selbstschutz Oberschlesiens and Freikorps

Commanders and leaders
Maciej Mielżyński	Karl Höfer; Bernhard von Hülsen; Peter von Heydebreck

Strength
	900

Casualties and losses
	120
- Location in Weimar Germany Location in modern Poland

The Battle of (the) Annaberg (Polish: Bitwa o Górę Św. Anny) was the biggest battle of the Silesian Uprisings. The battle, which took place between May 21–26, 1921, was fought at the Annaberg (Polish: Góra Św. Anny), a strategic hill near the village of Annaberg O.S. (Góra Świętej Anny), located southeast of Oppeln (Opole) in Upper Silesia, Weimar Germany. After the hill had been captured by irregular Polish-Silesian units in the Third Silesian Uprising, German Freikorps pushed the Polish forces back. The final border was determined by political and diplomatic efforts.

== Prelude ==
By the Treaty of Versailles, the German Reichswehr was limited to a strength of 100,000. Several independent paramilitary Freikorps units were formed from the remnants of the German Imperial Army. The German Freikorps units often did not obey orders from the official government, but the German government assisted in transportation and supplies. Freikorps units fought against the communist groups in Germany and also against Polish insurgents in the East. While Germany had recognized the independent Polish state in the aftermath of Versailles, there were some disputed areas, some of which saw violent conflict.

On April 30, 1921, Polish-Silesian officials led by Wojciech Korfanty, upon finding that Germany would be granted most of the plebiscite area in disputed Upper Silesia, decided to start the Third Uprising even though the government in Warsaw wanted to avoid hostilities at all cost.

On May 2, acts of sabotage by the Polish Wawelberg Group units under Konrad Wawelberg severed all connections between Upper Silesia and Germany.

On May 3, at 3 a.m., the Polish forces started an offensive and in the following days they pushed the small German forces westwards, reaching the line of the Oder River and capturing the 400 m strategic hill of Annaberg on May 4.

It took around two weeks for the Germans to prepare the counteroffensive and to bring in volunteers from other German areas. The leaders settled for Generalleutnant Karl Höfer as commander. Generalleutnant Bernhard von Hülsen would lead the southern force at the Oder, and Oberstleutnant Grüntzen would lead the northern force in the forests.

The German units were strengthened by the arrival of the Freikorps Oberland unit from Bavaria. Its 1650 soldiers were experienced veterans of World War I, under Major Albert Ritter von Beckh. Among members of the FK Oberland were notable figures of the future Nazi Germany, including Sepp Dietrich (who distinguished himself during the battle), Rudolf Höss, Kurt Eggers, Edmund Heines, Beppo Römer, and Peter von Heydebreck, leader of the Werewolves and later pronounced the "hero of Annaberg". Also, there were several student-volunteers from the Bavarian town of Erlangen. The German force also consisted of Silesian paramilitary battalions (Selbstschutzes Oberschlesien), consisting of recently demobilized veterans and men too young to have fought in World War I.

Although the Polish forces outnumbered the German troops in the region, the Germans had more experience than the Poles, many of whom were civilians.

== Battle ==
The Annaberg hill with the monastery located on top, was strategically significant as from its peak the whole valley of the Oder/Odra could be dominated. The German-Upper Silesian commanders, Generals Höfer and Hülsen, decided to use three battalions of the Bavarian Oberland, which were transported to Krappitz (Krapkowice), on 19/20 May 1921.

The German counterattack, which began at 2:30 a.m. on May 21, was led by the Oberland Freikorps and Silesian Selbstschutz. Hülsen concentrated his six and a half undersized battalions, numbering roughly 900 men, into two columns to form left and right wings. The Germans launched their offensive, which started from a hill north of the Annaberg, against a regiment of Polish Silesian insurgents from Pless (Pszczyna), under Franciszek Rataj. The Germans lacked artillery, however, and fighting was fierce. Hülsen wrote, "We learned then how painful it could be to mount an assault on a fortified position without a single piece of artillery". Bavarian Oberlanders were able to defeat a Polish counterattack with grenades and bayonets and capture two cannons, which they used in an attack on the town Oleschka (Oleszka) west of the mountain.

After seven hours of heavy combat, the Germans managed to force the Pless regiment to withdraw and then concentrated their attack on the neighboring regiment of Polish volunteers from Kattowitz (Katowice), under Walenty Fojkis, as well as Polish-Silesian battalions from Groß Strehlitz (Strzelce Opolskie) and Tost (Toszek), known as Group Bogdan. Among Polish forces defending the mountain, there were also miners from the Ferdinand coal mine in Kattowitz as well as workers from the Kattowitz suburb of Bogutschütz (Bogucice). Altogether, Polish forces fighting in the area of the Annaberg formed Group East.

At 11:00 a.m. the Germans began a coordinated advance on the mountain: the Finsterlin Battalion from the northwest, the Assault Detachment Heintz from the southwest, the Oestricher Battalion from the east, and the Sebringhaus Battalion and the Eicke Company from the southeast. Under German pressure, the Poles, after heavy hand-to-hand combat, withdrew east. The subsequent Polish counterattack was repelled and the success of the Freikorps was widely reported in Germany, as it was regarded as the first German victory since November 1918.

At the end of the day Polish defenders established defensive positions in Wielmierzowice, Krasowa, Zales Śląski and Popice. According to Hoefer's reports, in the subsequent fighting some of the German battalions were reduced to between 10 and 15% of their initial strength. By the afternoon of the 21st, Polish insurgents had pushed German forces back from Kalinow, Poznowic, Sprzecis and the railway station in Kamień.

On the 22nd, Polish insurgents attacked and took back Raszowa and Daniec and in the Januszkowic region fought back a German attempt at crossing of the Oder.

On May 23, the Poles, after regrouping and strengthening their forces with a battalion from Hindenburg O.S. (Zabrze) under Paweł Cyms, initiated another strong attack, but it was repulsed by the German artillery, with great losses on both sides. Heavy fighting took place in neighboring villages, such as Leschnitz (Leśnica), Lichynia, Krasowa, Dolna, Olszowa and Klucz.

== Aftermath ==
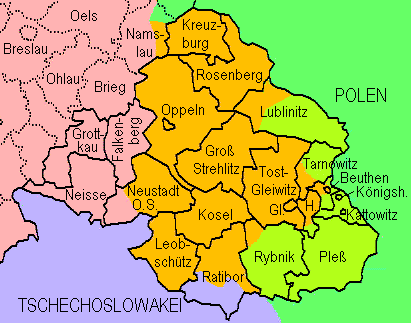
Map of the plebiscite areas.

The government of both sides could barely influence events as neither side had solid command structures and forces acted independently. On May 25, the Selbstschutz, under pressure from Berlin, which threatened the Freikorps with serious penalties, decided to initiate peace talks. On the next day, the general command of Polish forces ordered its units to cease fighting. Some additional skirmishes took place around June 4 to June 6.

In early July, Allied troops entered the area and separated the fighting sides. Both Poles and Germans disengaged and retreated. For internal and external political reasons, the contributions of the German fighters were not officially recognized by the government. That supported bitter feelings against the Weimar Republic. The reputation of the "Annaberg heroes" helped them in later years, however.

The disputed territory of Upper Silesia was subsequently divided between the two countries along voting lines (in the Upper Silesia plebiscite), with Poland receiving the eastern third of the area with the coal mines. The new border followed roughly the line separating the sides at the close of hostilities (see Upper Silesia plebiscite). The Annaberg itself remained part of Germany until 1945, when it was transferred to Poland according to the Potsdam Agreement.

== See also ==
- History of Silesia
- Polish Military Organization of Upper Silesia
- Silesian Eagle
