= Xawery Dunikowski =

Polish artist (1875–1964)

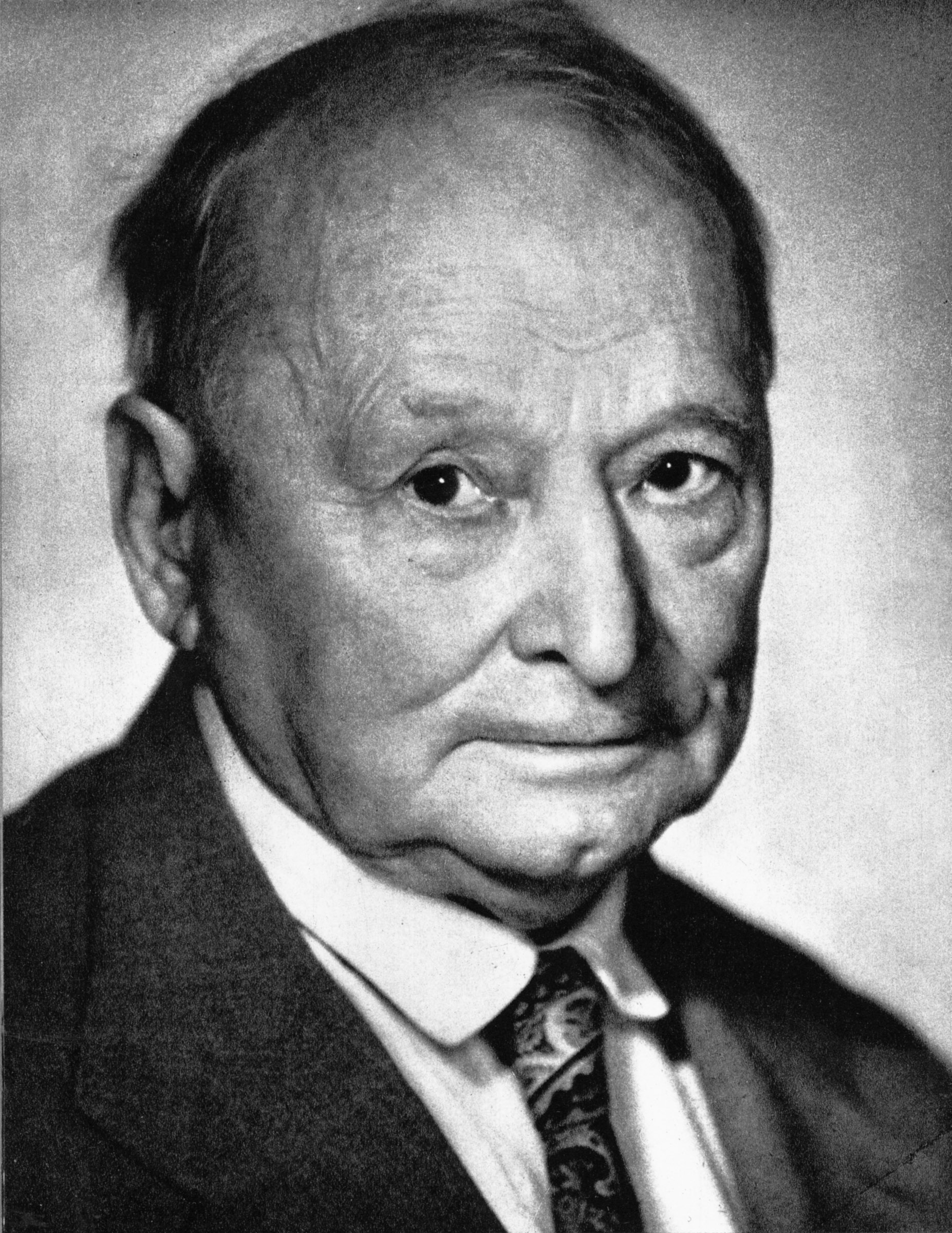
- Born: 24 November 1875; Kraków, Austria–Hungary
- Died: 26 January 1964 (aged 88); Warsaw, Poland

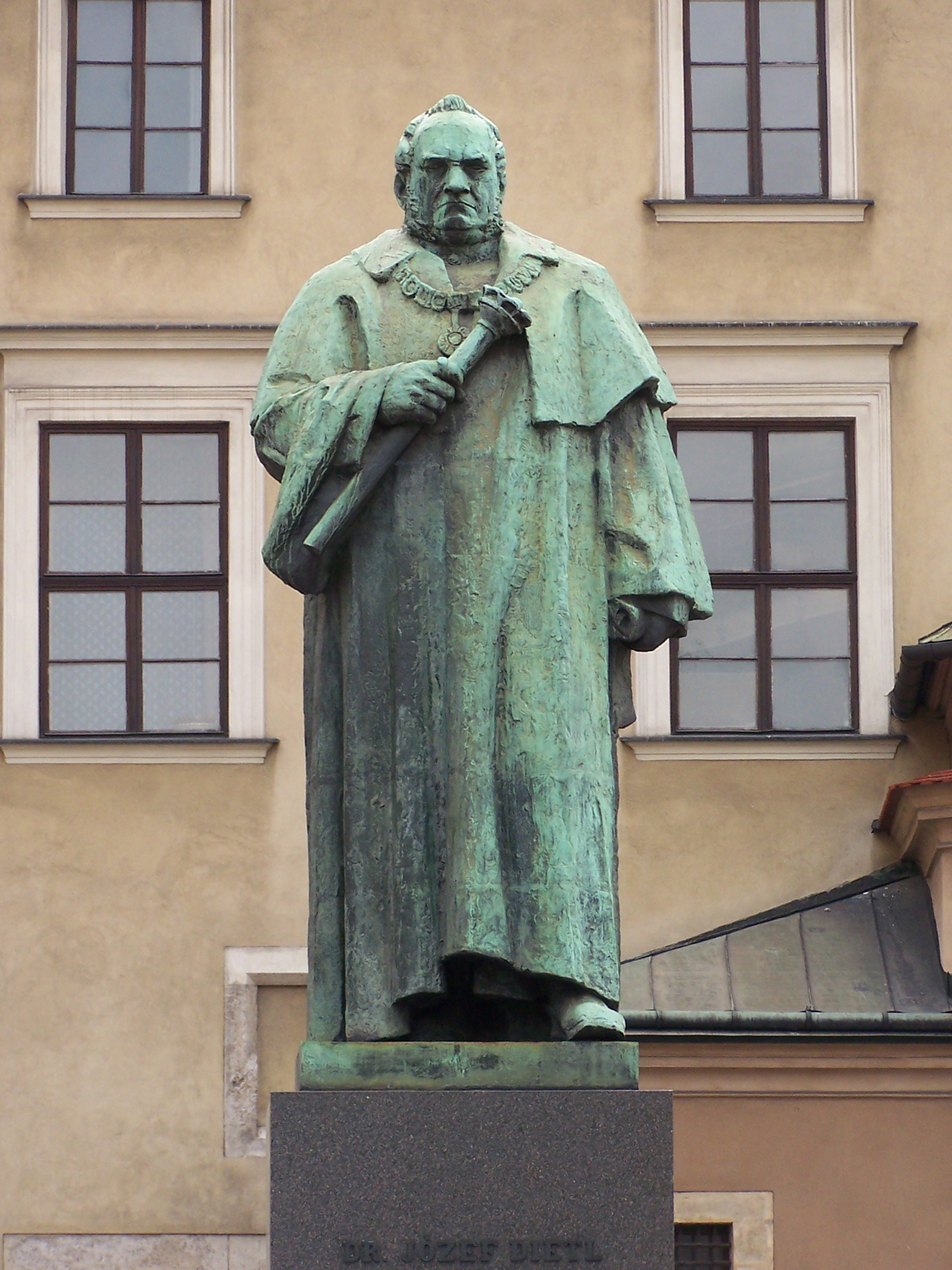
Statue of mayor Józef Dietl in Kraków by Xawery Dunikowski

Xawery Dunikowski (Polish pronunciation: [ksaˈvɛrɨ duɲiˈkɔfskʲi]; 24 December 1875 – 26 January 1964) was a Polish sculptor and artist, notable for surviving Auschwitz concentration camp, and best known for his Neo-Romantic sculptures and Auschwitz-inspired art.

== Biography ==
Dunikowski was born in Kraków, a city he had an affinity for and would also use as the basis for a collection of art. When he was twelve his family moved to Warsaw, and after finishing his education in a technical school he studied sculpture under Boleslaw Syrewicz and Leon Wasilkowski. At twenty one, Dunikowski moved back to Kraków to study sculpture at the School of Fine Arts under Konstanty Laszczka, admirer of Auguste Rodin, and under Alfred Daun. He studied painting with Jan Stanisławski and after being enrolled for three years, he graduated with honors.

In 1902 Dunikowski began teaching sculpture at the Academy of Fine Arts in Warsaw, a professorship he would hold until 1909 when he was appointed the Chair of Sculpture Department at the Jan Matejko Academy of Fine Arts in Kraków.

On January 18, 1905, amid a quarrel in a Warsaw restaurant, he shot and killed Wacław Pawliszak, a fellow artist and popular Warsaw society figure. As a result, he was arrested and then released on a 2,000 rubles bail, while being charged with manslaughter (crime of passion). However, he was never really tried by the Tsarist justice apparatus, which at that time was busy with the Revolution of 1905, as well as other problems. Being an Austrian subject, he was subsequently allowed to return to Kraków, and never actually did any jail time or paid any retribution for his crime to the victim's family.

Heading to Paris shortly before the beginning of World War I, Dunikowski remained in France from 1914 to 1920 (he served 5 years in the French Foreign Legion) until he returned to Kraków in 1921 to take the position of Head of Faculty of Sculpture at the Academy of Fine Arts there. While working at the academy, he educated many Polish sculptors including: Jerzy Bandura, Zygmunt Gawlik, Józef Gosławski, Maria Jarema, Ludwik Konarzewski (junior), Jacek Puget and Henryk Wiciński, and Polish-American woodcarver Adam Dabrowski. Dunikowski did not leave Kraków until 1940 when he was arrested by the Gestapo.

== War years ==
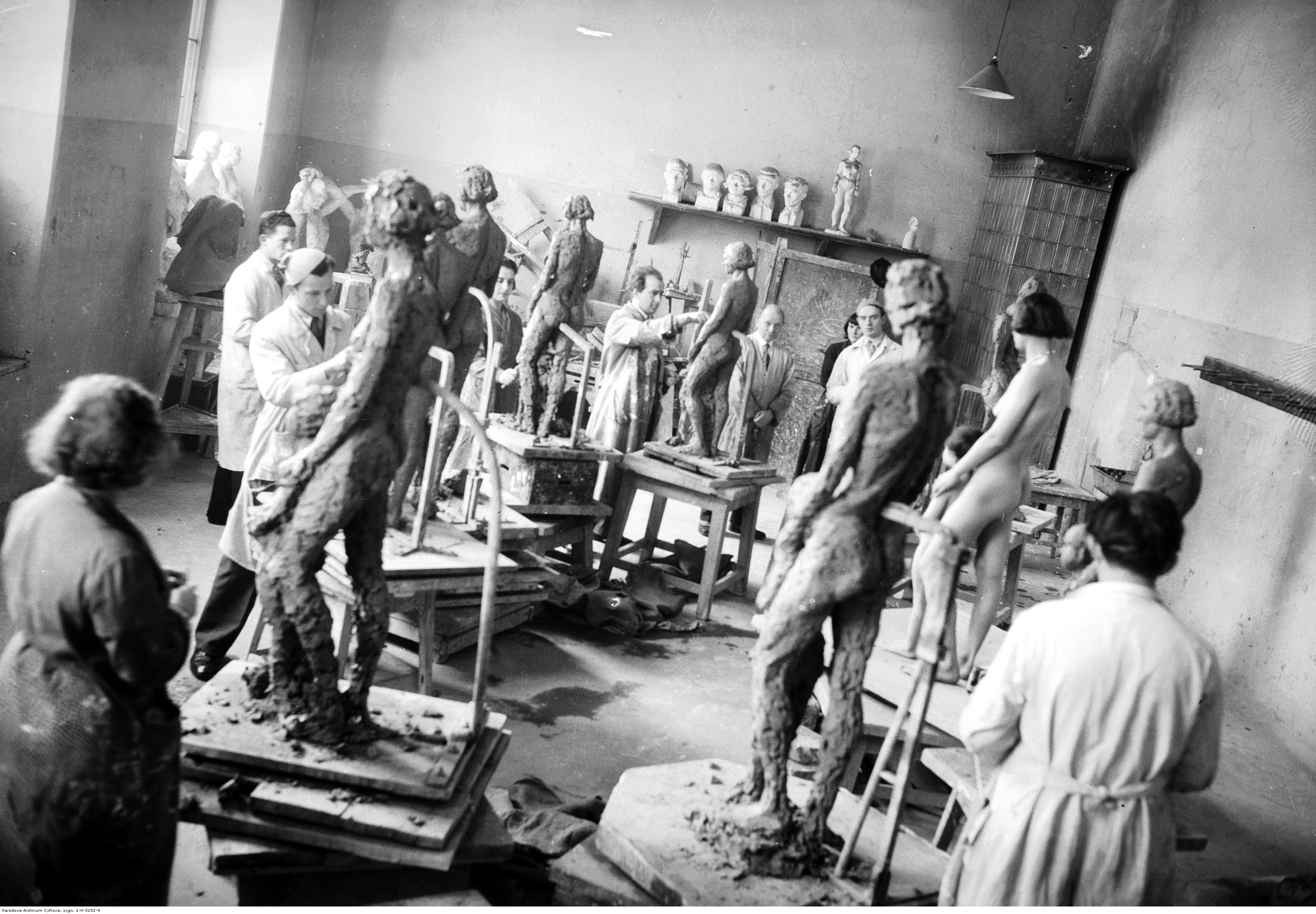
Students in the studio of Dunikowski at the Academy of Fine Arts in Krakow, 1933

Dunikowski was arrested by the Germans on 15 May 1940 and deported to the Auschwitz concentration camp on 26 June 1940. In Auschwitz, he was assigned the number 774. The detainment has interrupted his work on a series of sculptures entitled Heads from the Kraków Palace, based on busts found up on the ceilings of Renaissance castles. Auschwitz had demoralized the artist up to a point where he said that he had died there and refused all requests, mainly by Schutzstaffel (SS) guards, who urged him to make a model of the camp. Being already of an advanced age, in 1942 Dunikowski fell sick and readily was selected to be killed, until his name was crossed out by a fellow Pole of the list of prisoners doomed to be gassed. Narrowly escaping death, he once again nearly met his fate when in September 1943 he was accused of belonging to a resistance movement within the camp, and was therefore sentenced to be shot. However, due to further illness, he was sent back to the infirmary and had his sentence reduced. By 1944, still hospitalized, he began to draw portraits of fellow prisoners. Each drawing had to be smuggled out, and the ones that have made it were sent back to Kraków. Dunikowski had still not fully recovered by 27 January 1945, when the Soviet Red Army liberated Auschwitz, but by 1946 he has returned to his position at the Academy of Fine Arts in Kraków. He has also resumed his work on the Heads from the Kraków Palace series of sculptures.

== Postwar period ==
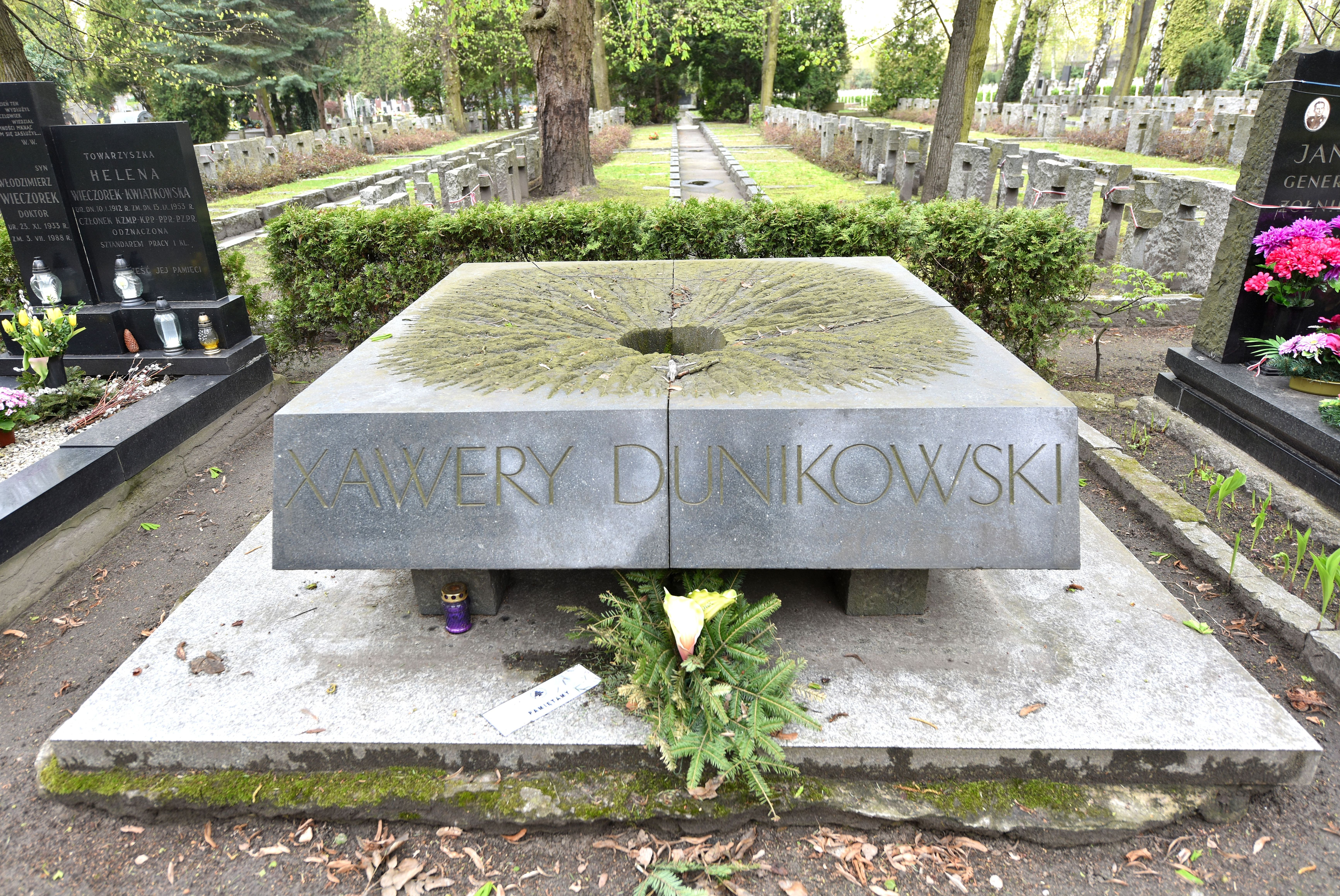
Tomb of Xawery Dunikowski in Warsaw

By the time he had returned to his normal life and recovered from his illness, Dunikowski was already seventy years old, and had started to create larger art to coincide with many of his Auschwitz-themed drawings and sculptures. His postwar interests started to drift toward architecture and tying it further to sculpture, as well as public monuments, most notably the Monument of the Liberation of the Region of Warmia and Mazury and the Revolutionary Effort, located in Olsztyn and at Góra Świętej Anny. Dunikowski had lived to see his works on display both in his hometown of Kraków, as well as exhibited in Warsaw, and at other venues, which by the early- to mid-1950s have included Moscow and Venice.

In 1955, Dunikowski was the subject of a film documentary themed around his workshop, titled Idę do słońca (I am Going toward the Sun), but he took little interest in the film itself nor in its director, Andrzej Wajda. Featured in the documentary was another famous series of sculptures by Dunikowski titled Kobiety brzemienne (Pregnant Women).

In the same year Dunikowski became the professor of the Academy of Fine Arts in Warsaw, thus leaving Kraków for good. He also held professorship at the State Higher School of Visual Arts in Wrocław.

In 1964, at the age of eighty-eight, Xawery Dunikowski died, leaving behind a legacy of art including some of his more famous sculptures, Macierzyństwo (Motherhood, 1900), Skupienie (Concentration), Fatum (Fate, 1904), Dante, sculpture series including the Women of Nieborów and the Jesuits' Circle, along with many illustrations, portraits, and other works. Considered to be the best 20th century Polish sculptor, Dunikowski is buried in the Alley of the Meritorious in Powązki Military Cemetery, Warsaw; his tomb sculpture was created by a former pupil, Barbara Zbrożyna.

== Museum ==
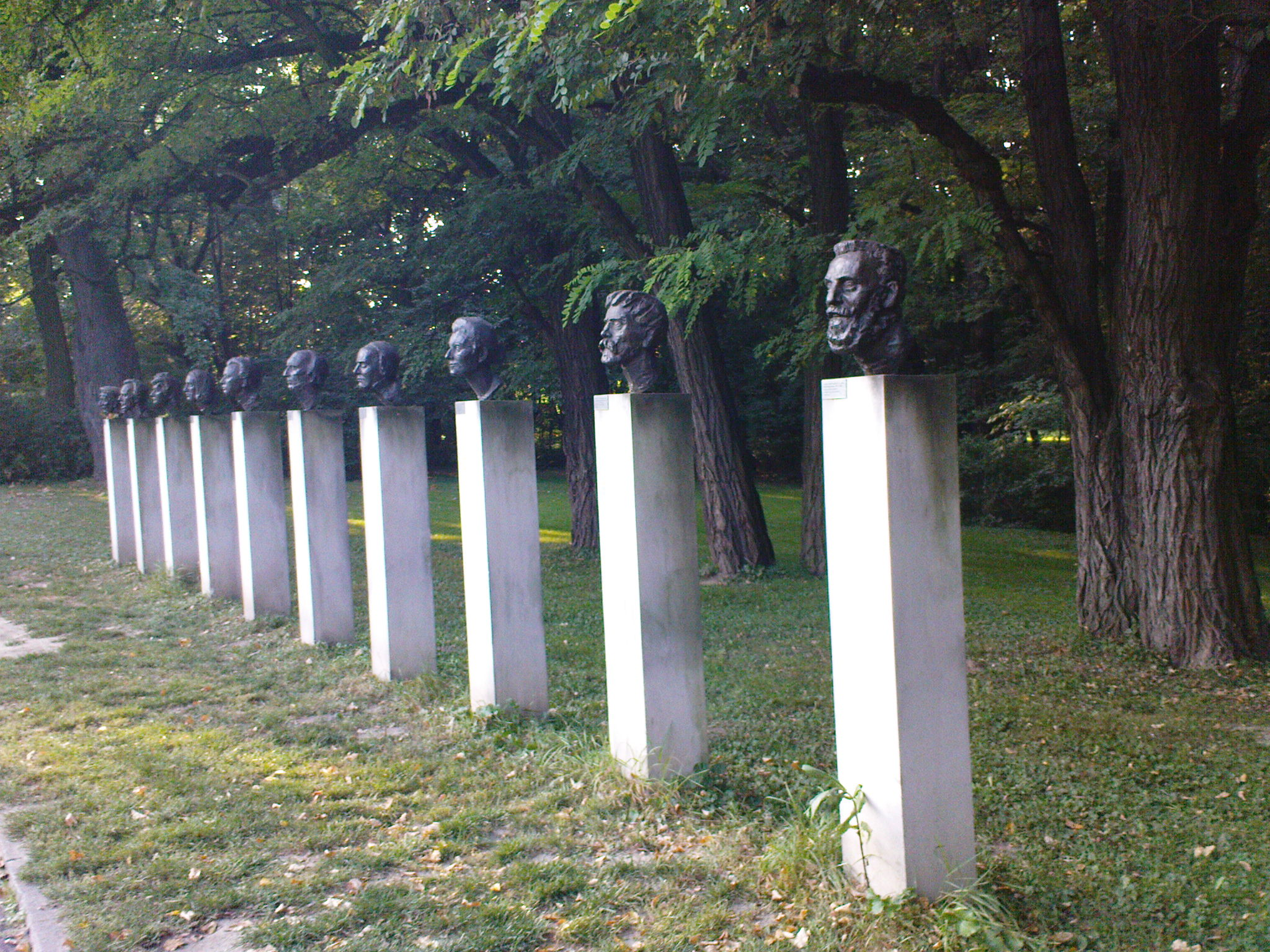
Wawel Heads series at Krolikarnia

The former Warsaw palace of Królikarnia houses a museum dedicated to Dunikowski. Many of his famous works are on display in the park that surrounds it, among which is the sculpture in sandstone known as The Soul Escaping the Body (1918).
