= Tychy =

- City county
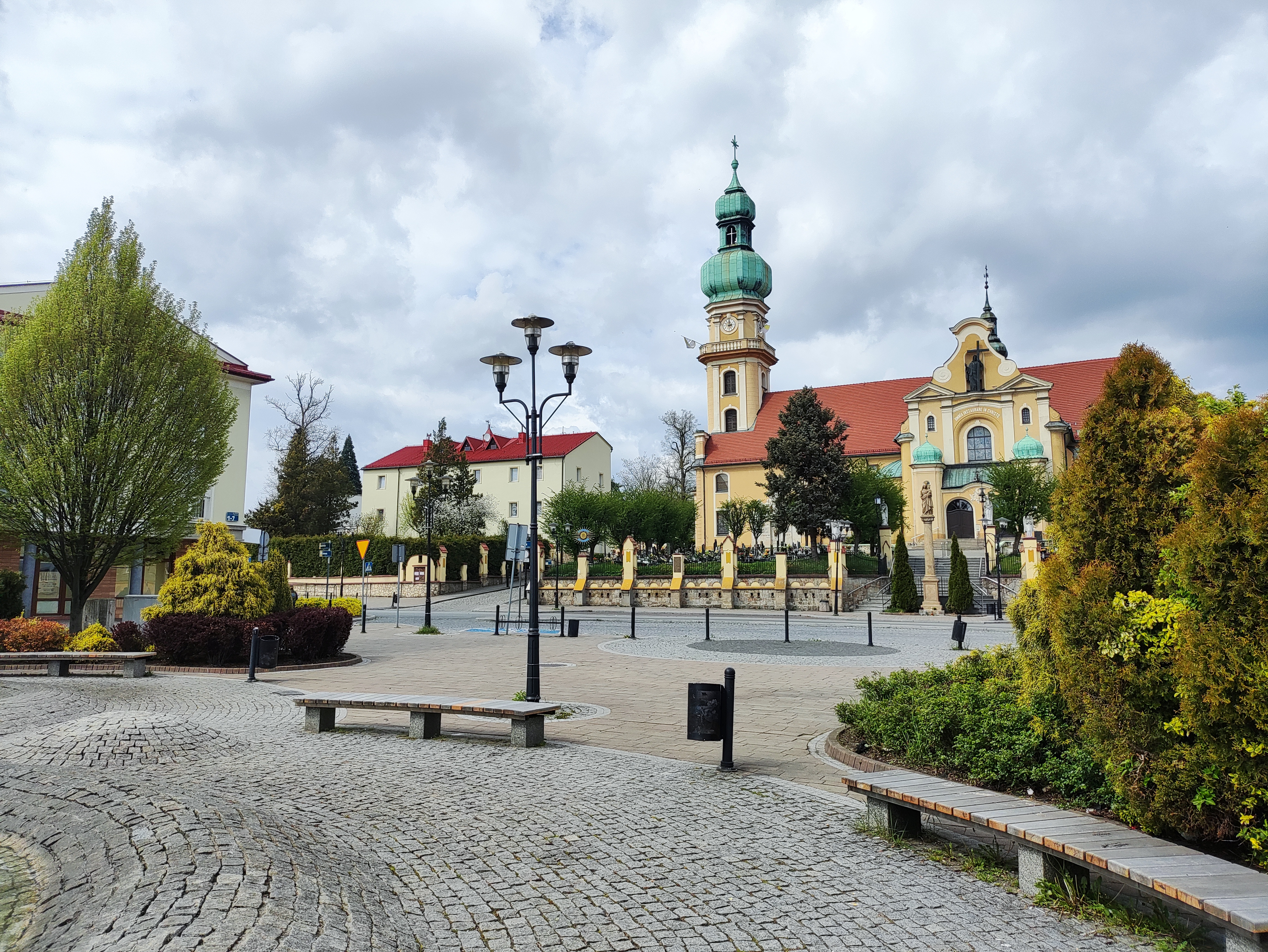
- Mary Magdalene Church

- Coat of arms
- Motto: Tychy - a good place
- Location within Poland
- Coordinates: 50°07′25″N 18°59′12″E
- Country: Poland
- Voivodeship: Silesian
- County: City-county
- First mentioned: 1467
- City rights: 1951

Government
  - City mayor: Maciej Gramatyka (KO)

Area
  - Total: 81.64 km^{2} (31.52 sq mi)

Population (31 December 2021)
  - Total: 125,781 ▼ (28th)
  - Density: 1,560/km^{2} (4,000/sq mi)
- Time zone: UTC+1 (CET)
  - Summer (DST): UTC+2 (CEST)
- Postal code: 43-100 to 43-135
- Area code: +48 32
- Car plates: ST
- Website: https://umtychy.pl/

Tychy (Polish pronunciation: [ˈtɨxɨ]; ) is a city in Silesia in southern Poland, approximately 20 kilometres (12 mi) south of Katowice. Situated on the southern edge of the Upper Silesian industrial district, the city borders Katowice to the north, Mikołów to the west, Bieruń to the east and Kobiór to the south. The Gostynia river, a tributary of the Vistula, flows through Tychy.

Since 1999, Tychy has been located within the Silesian Voivodeship. Tychy is also one of the founding cities of the Metropolitan Association of Upper Silesia, a pan-Silesian economic and political union formed with the eventual aim of bringing the most populous Silesian areas under a single administrative body.

Tychy is well known for its brewing industry and the Tyskie brand of beer, which dates back to the 17th century. Since 1950, Tychy has grown rapidly, mainly as a result of post-war socialist planning policies enacted to disperse the population of industrial Upper Silesia. The city is also known as the home of the accomplished ice hockey club GKS Tychy.

== Etymology ==
The name Tychy is derived from the Polish word cichy, meaning "quiet" or "still". Although appropriate for most of Tychy's history, the name is now somewhat ironic considering the growth of the city from 1950 onwards.

== History ==
=== Origins and development ===
Originally established as a small agricultural settlement on the medieval trade route between Oświęcim and Mikołów, Tychy was first documented in 1467. In 1629 the first trace of serious economic activity was recorded in the shape of the Książęcy Brewery, which is now one of the largest breweries in Poland.

From 1526 onwards the area on which Tychy is built was part of the Austrian Habsburg monarchy. In 1742 Prussia annexed the land after winning the First Silesian War against the Habsburg monarchy. From 1871 to 1918, the territory became part of the German Empire. For a short period between 1918 and 1921, Tychy was just inside the border of the newly formed Weimar Republic and still a part of the German Province of Silesia. On 16–17 August 1919 the Battle of Paprocany (present-day district of Tychy) was fought as one of the first battles of the Silesian Uprisings (1919–1921). In the 1921 plebiscite, in Tychy 83.5% voted for reintergration with Poland, while in then surrounding settlements (present-day districts) of Cielmice, Jaroszowice, Paprocany, Urbanowice, Wilkowyje, the result ranged from 88.2% voting for Poland in Wilkowyje to 94.4% in Cielmice. After the uprisings Tychy was reintegrated with the re-established Polish state.

Shortly after its cession to Poland, Tychy began to develop into a small urban settlement, acquiring a hospital, a fire station, a post office, a school, a swimming pool, a bowling hall and a number of shops and restaurants. In 1922 it was visited by leader of interwar Poland, Józef Piłsudski. Its population also grew between World War I and World War II, reaching a population of 11,000 at its highest point during this time.

=== World War II ===
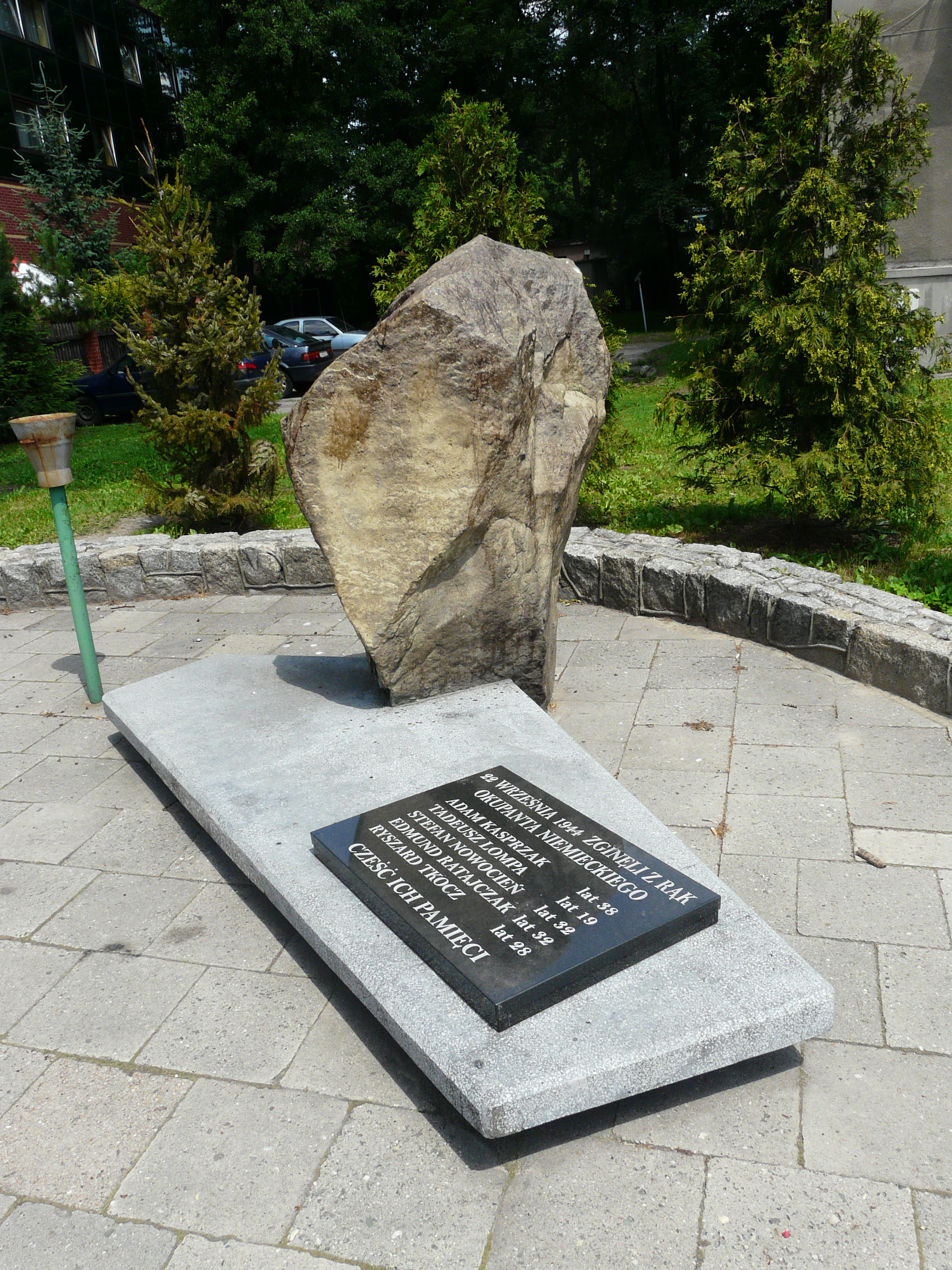
Memorial to Poles murdered by the Germans in the last public execution in Tychy on September 22, 1944

Along with the rest of industrial Upper Silesia Tychy was occupied by Nazi Germany forces after the invasion of Poland and annexed into the Third Reich, while many of its inhabitants who were not expelled or exterminated were forced to change their nationality to German in order to comply with the racist policies of Nazi Germany. Mass arrests and executions of Polish activists and former Polish insurgents of 1919–1921 were carried out in the first days of the occupation in September 1939. As early as September 3, 1939, the Germans murdered several Polish residents of the city, of whom 13 were later identified, the youngest was 16 years old. The Germans also carried out manhunts of Polish insurgents who were hiding in the forest between Tychy and Mikołów, and established and operated a Polenlager forced labor camp for Poles in the city, and the E701 labor subcamp of the Stalag VIII-B/344 prisoner-of-war camp in the present-day Czułów district. The last public execution was carried out on September 22, 1944, when five members of the underground Polish resistance movement were killed. Tychy received minimal damage during the invasion because most of the nearby fighting took place in the Mikołów-Wyry area. In the final stages of the war, in 1945, a German-conducted death march of thousands of prisoners of the Auschwitz concentration camp and its subcamps passed through the city towards Gliwice.

Tychy was liberated on January 28, 1945.

=== New Tychy ===
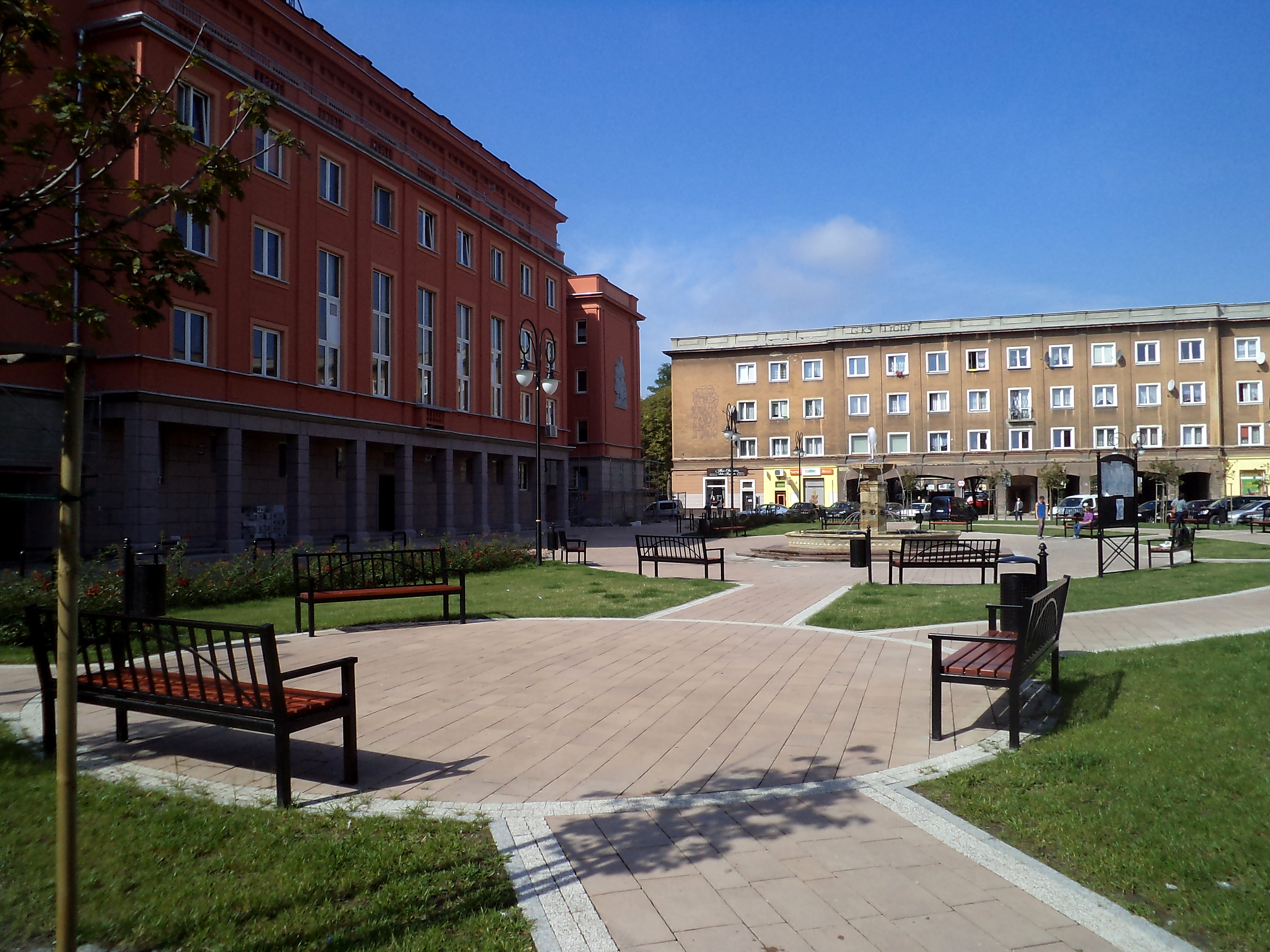
Osiedle A in Tychy, built in the 1950s

The "New City" was designated by the Polish government in 1950 and deliberately located near to Katowice with the intention that it would not be a self-sustaining city. It was granted town rights in 1951. Tychy is the largest of the so-called "new towns" in Poland and was built from 1950 to 1985, to allow for urban expansion in the southeast of the Upper Silesian industrial region. In the 1950s the neighbourhood Osiedle A was built, designed by Tadeusz Teodorowicz-Todorowski, and the design and planning of the next neighbourhoods was entrusted to Kazimierz Wejchert and his wife Hanna Adamczewska-Wejchert. In the 1950s, 1960s and 1970s numerous industrial enterprises were created. In 1951 and 1973 the city limits were greatly expanded by including Paprocany and Wilkowyje (in 1951), and Cielmice, Urbanowice, Jaroszowice (in 1973) as new districts. By 2006, the population had reached 132,500.

In the administrative reforms which came into effect in 1999, Tychy was made a city with the status of a powiat (city county). Between 1999 and 2002, it was also the administrative seat of (but not part of) an entity called Tychy County (powiat tyski), which is now known as the Bieruń-Lędziny County.

The Tyskie Brewing Museum was founded in 2004, and the Municipal Museum in 2005.

== Districts ==
Historical population
| Year | Pop. | ±% |
|---|---|---|
| 1960 | 49,914 | — |
| 1970 | 71,500 | +43.2% |
| 1980 | 166,573 | +133.0% |
| 1990 | 191,723 | +15.1% |
| 2000 | 133,463 | −30.4% |
| 2010 | 129,386 | −3.1% |
| 2020 | 126,871 | −1.9% |

Tychy is divided into 17 districts (dzielnicas):

- Cielmice (south)
- Czułów (north)
- Glinka, Tychy (west)
- Jaroszowice (north-east)
- Mąkołowiec (north-west)
- Paprocany (south)
- Radziejówka (north-west)
- Śródmieście (city centre)
- Stare Tychy (centre, old town)
- Suble
- Urbanowice, Tychy (east)
- Wartogłowiec (north)
- Wilkowyje (north-west)
- Wygorzele (north)
- Zawiść (north-east)
- Zwierzyniec (north)
- Żwaków (west)

== Industry ==
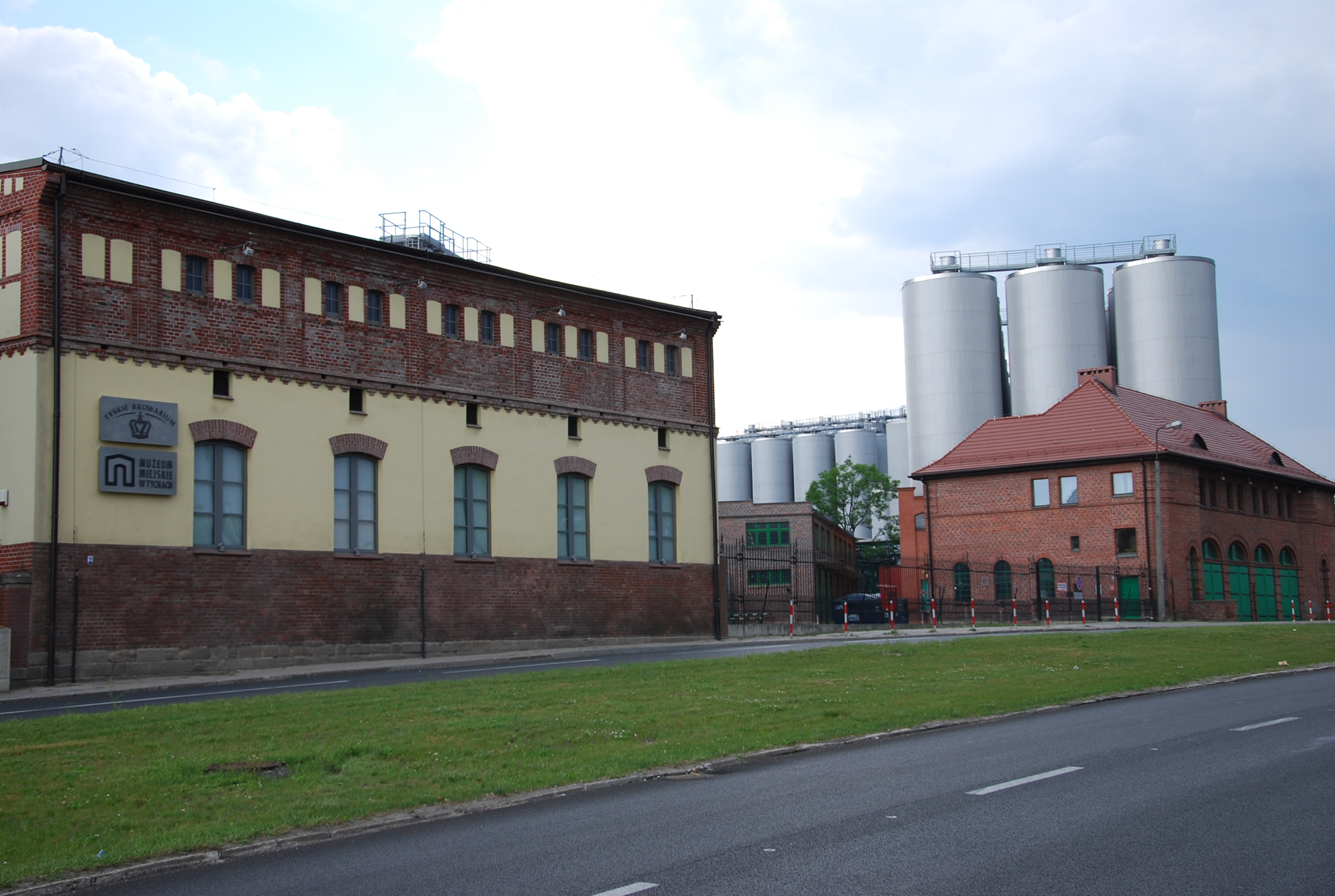
Brewery in Tychy on the right, Tyskie Brewing Museum on the left

The global car manufacturer Stellantis has a major presence in the city. The first car factory was opened by FSM in 1975, and was fully acquired by the Italian manufacturer Fiat in 1992. In 2008, the factory (FCA Poland) had a production of nearly half a million cars. It produces the new Fiat 500 and the Lancia Ypsilon. It was the exclusive manufacturing site for the second generation Fiat Panda until 2012, when it ended production, and of the second generation Ford Ka (under an OEM agreement between the two manufacturers) until May 2016.

Also located in Tychy is a powertrain factory producing automobile engines for Opel cars. This plant was opened by Isuzu as Isuzu Motors Polska (ISPOL) in 1996; in 2002 General Motors took a 60% interest in that company, and in 2013 the remaining 40%. In 2017 Groupe PSA acquired GM's operations in Europe. In January 2021 both the former Fiat and Opel plants became part of Stellantis.

The Tyskie beer is produced in Tychy, by Kompania Piwowarska, a subsidiary of the multinational brewing company Asahi Breweries. It is reportedly one of the best selling brands of beer in Poland, with around 18% share of the Polish market as of 2009.

=== Notable manufacturing enterprises ===
| Enterprise | Industry |
|---|---|
| Stellantis (formerly Fiat) | Automotive |
| Tyskie Browary Książęce | Brewing |
| Nexteer Automotive Poland | Automotive |
| Stellantis Powersystem (formerly Isuzu) | Automotive (engine manufacturing) |
| Hager Production Poland | Electrical engineering |
| Unimet Automotive | Automotive (components) |

== Transport ==
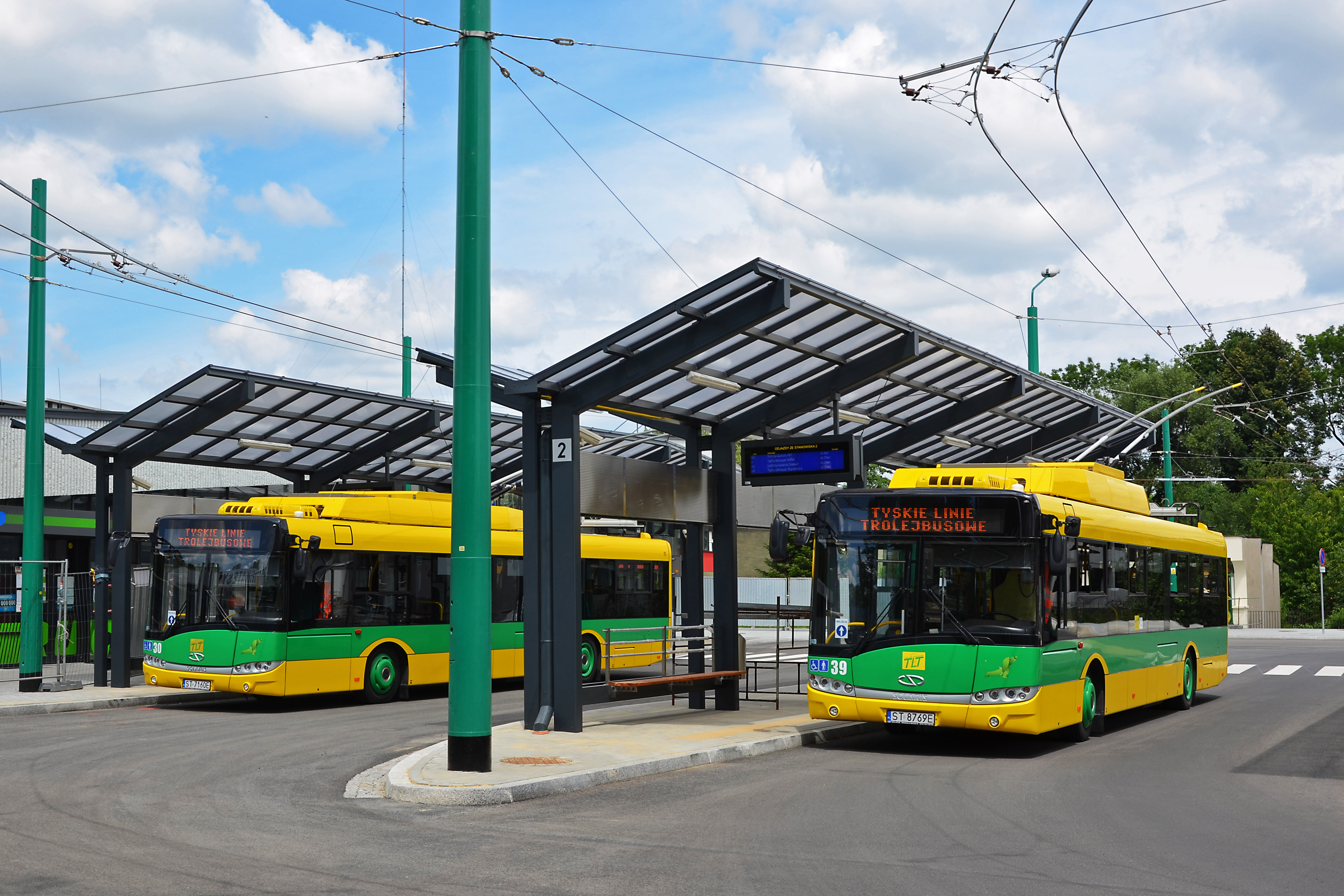
Two trolleybuses at Tychy railway station

One of three remaining trolleybus systems in Poland operates in Tychy. The other cities where you can find them are Lublin and Gdynia.

=== Roads ===
- Expressway S1
- National road 1
- National road 44
- National road 86

== Sports ==
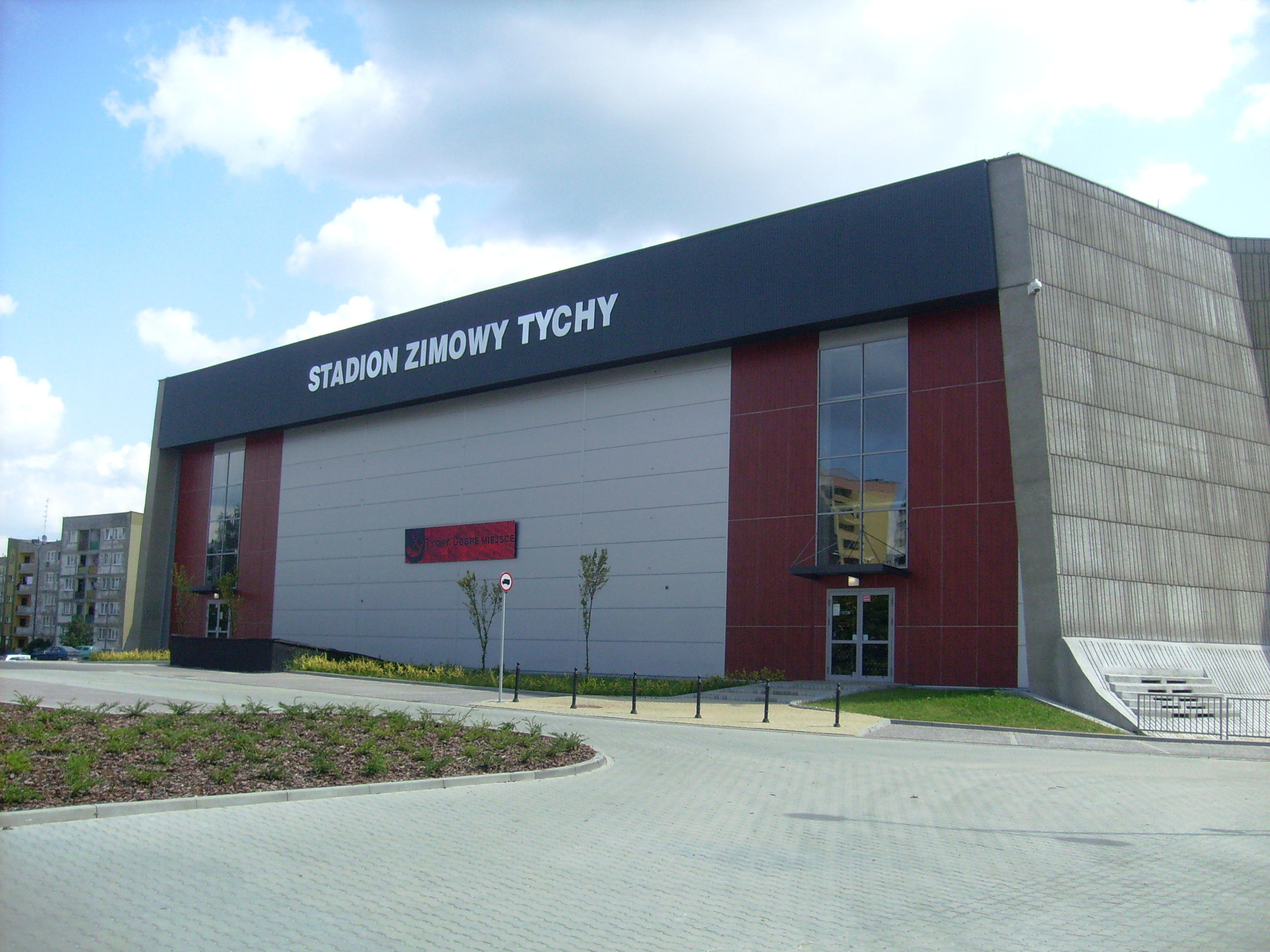
Tychy Winter Stadium, home to GKS Tychy ice hockey club

Tychy is home to two major sporting teams, both named GKS Tychy. GKS stands for Górniczy Klub Sportowy, (English: Miner's Sporting Club), which is a common prefix for Polish sports teams situated near mines or in mining regions.

=== Ice hockey ===
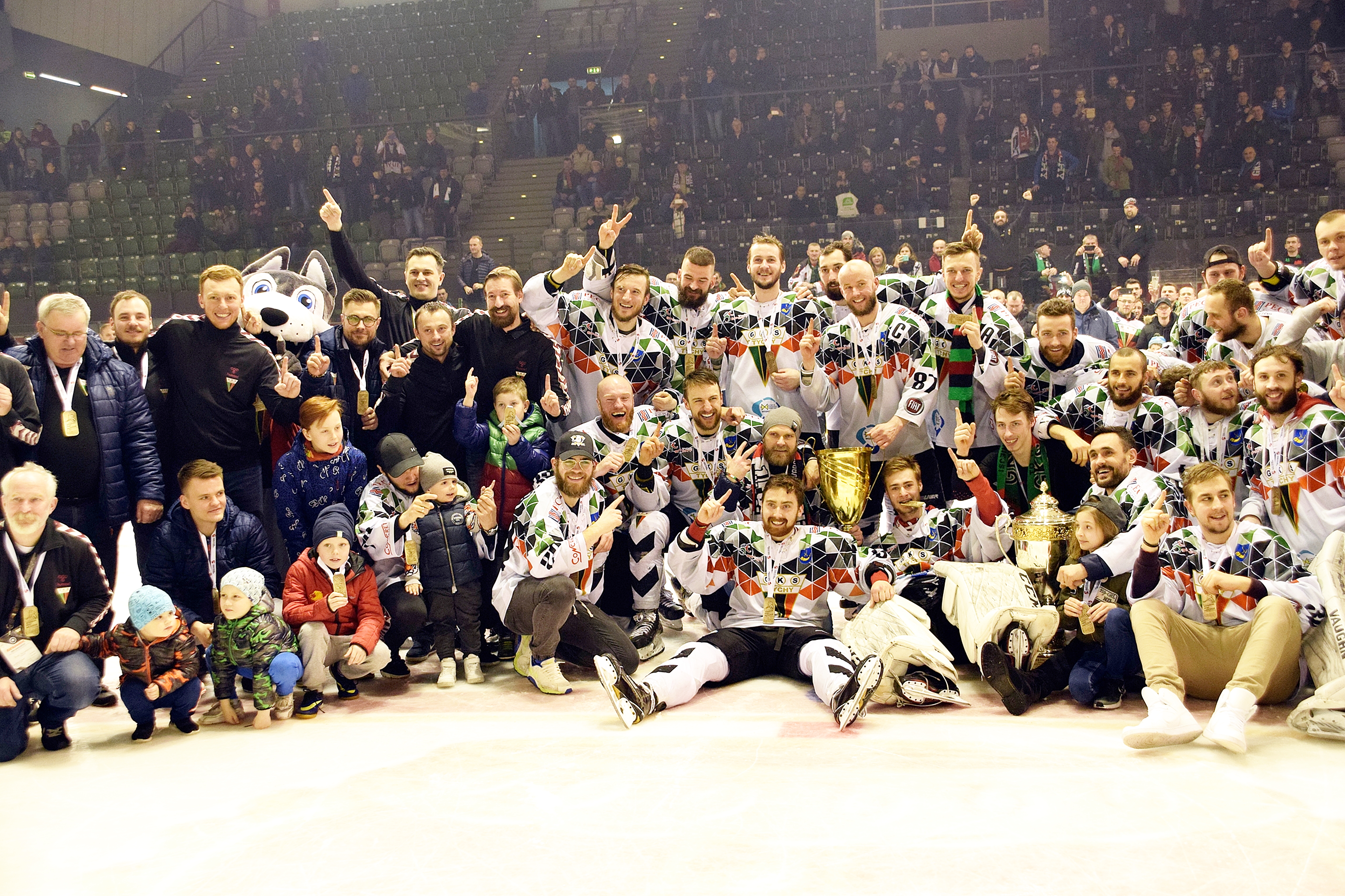
GKS Tychy celebrating the Polish championship in 2018

The GKS Tychy ice hockey club is among the most successful in Poland and plays in its premier league, the Ekstraliga. Established in 1971, the team won the Polish Championships in 2005, 2015, 2018, 2019, 2020, 2025 and 2026 and has won the Polish Cup eight times. The club is housed in the newly refurbished Tychy Winter Stadium (Polish: Stadion Zimowy w Tychach), which seats 2,700 people.

Several players from the club have gone on to play in the American and Canadian NHL. These include Mariusz Czerkawski and Krzysztof Oliwa.

=== Football ===
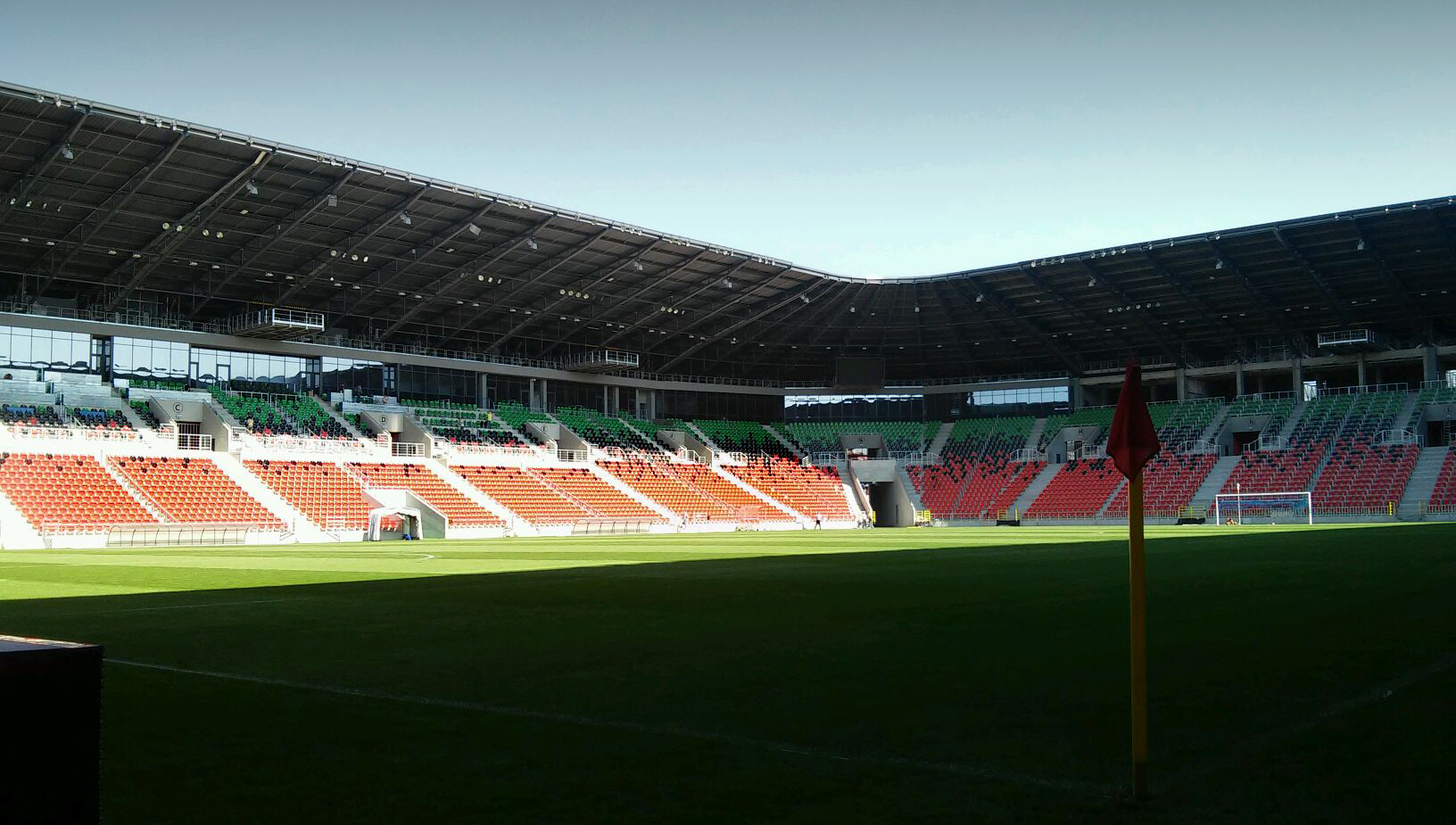
Tychy City Stadium, home to the GKS Tychy football club

The GKS Tychy football club football club was also established in 1971 and currently plays in the Polish Second League. Throughout a varied career the club reached its peak classification between 1974 and 1977, when it made it into the Ekstraklasa, Poland's top league, where it finished second in 1976. During those glory days GKS Tychy also participated in the 1976–77 UEFA Cup. It played in the top division again in 1995–1997. Tychy City Stadium (Polish: Stadion Miejski w Tychach) is home to the club and seats 15,300 spectators.

A few notable footballers were either born in Tychy or spent some of their career at the club, the most famous being Real Madrid and Poland goalkeeper Jerzy Dudek. Ekstraklasa player Bartosz Karwan started his career there, as did retired player Radosław Gilewicz. Napoli and Poland national team striker Arkadiusz Milik was born in Tychy, as well as former Bayer Leverkusen defender Lukas Sinkiewicz, who now holds German citizenship.

Tychy hosted several matches of the 2019 FIFA U-20 World Cup.

=== American Football ===
Tychy Falcons are an American Football team established in 2008. They currently competed in PFL2 - second tier of American Football in Poland.

=== Other sporting teams ===
Tychy is also home to several other sports teams, including basketball team GKS Tychy, futsal team GKS Futsal Tychy and floorball team TKKF Pionier Tychy.

== Notable people ==
Tychy has been the birthplace and home of notable people, both past and present. German sculptor August Kiss (1802–1865) was born in Paprotzan, which is now situated within modern day Tychy. Most famous for his grand neoclassical works, Kiss also sculpted the fine pulpit of St. Adalbert's church in Tychy's neighbouring town of Mikołów. Augustyn Dyrda (born 1926) is a sculptor who currently resides in the city and is best known for his socialist realist and modernist works, including several in Tychy itself.

Soldier Roman Polko (born 1962) is one son of Tychy whose achievements hold national importance today. His distinguished career has led him to the post of acting chief in Poland's Bureau of National Security.

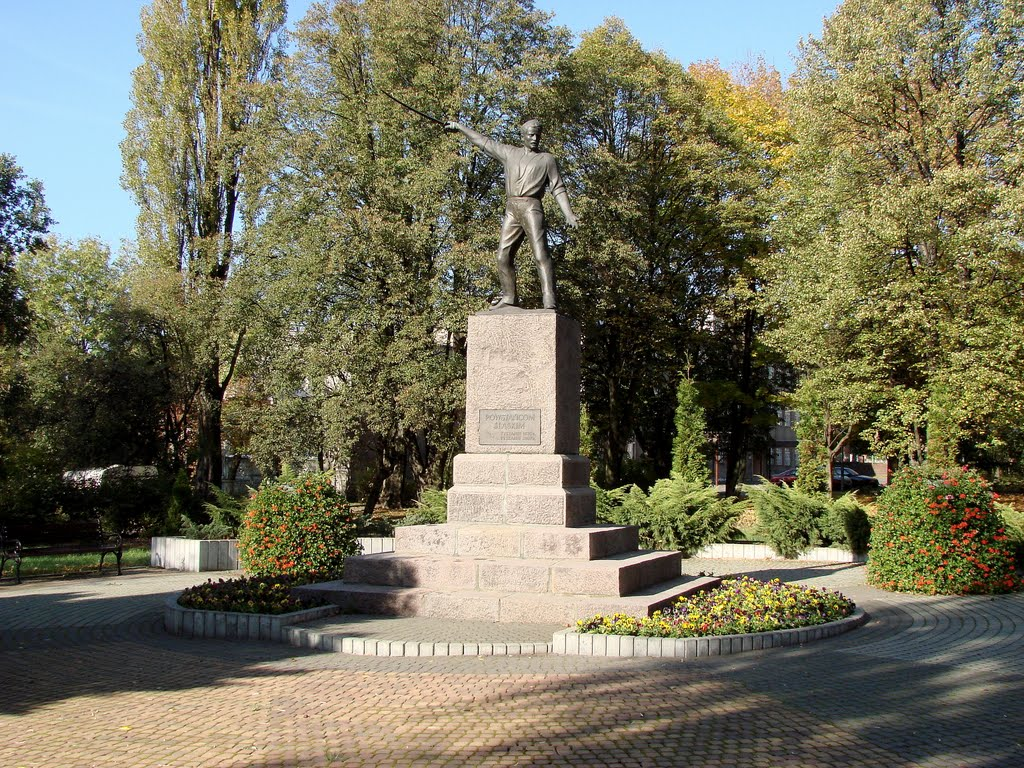
Silesian Uprisings Monument

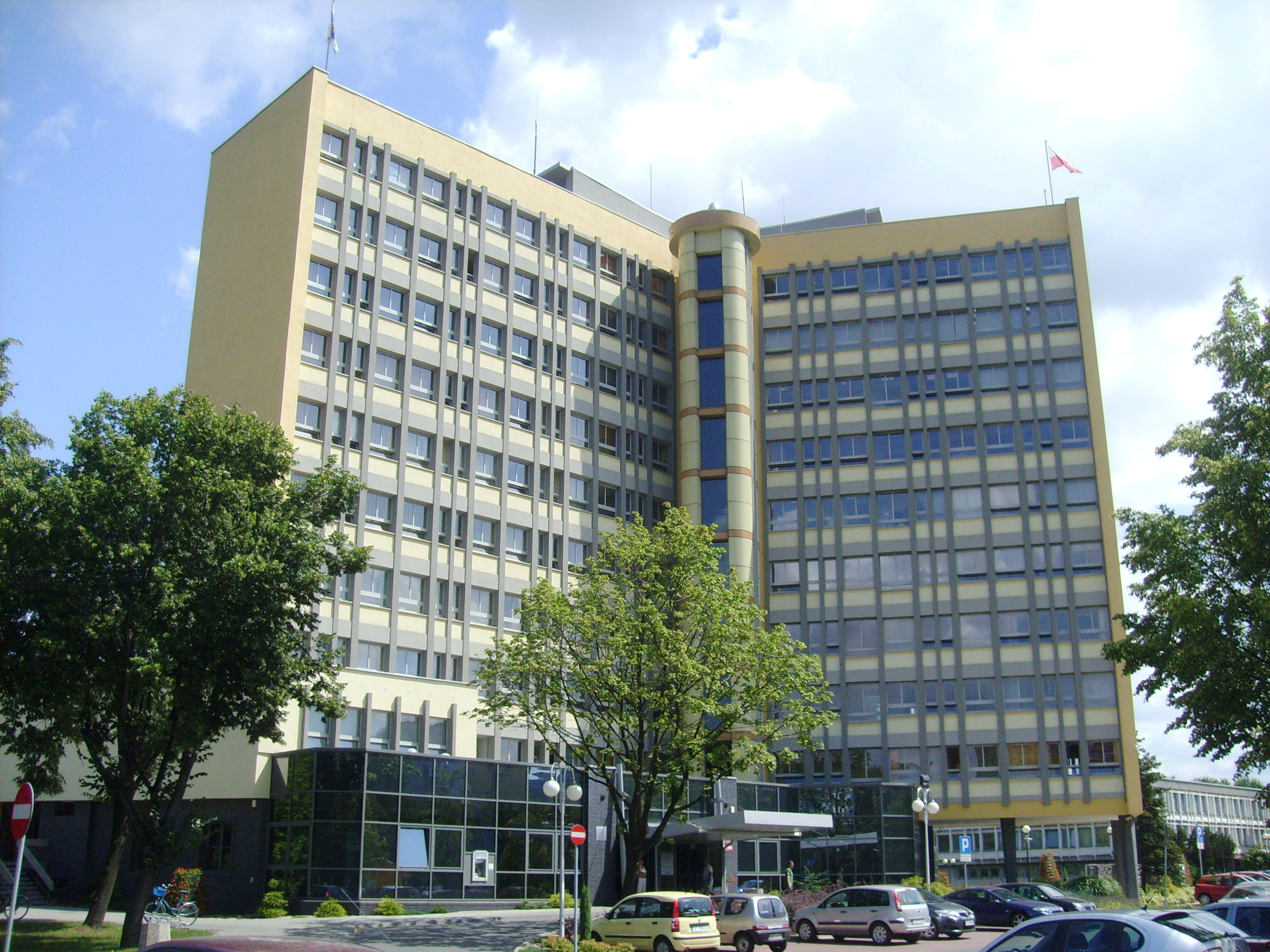
City Hall in Tychy

- August Kiss (1802–1865), German sculptor
- Józef Krupiński (1930–1998), poet and lyricist
- Roman Ogaza (1952–2006), footballer
- Lucyna Langer (born 1956), athlete
- Ryszard Riedel (1956–1994), musician, lead singer of blues-rock band Dżem
- Ireneusz Krosny (born 1968), pantomime comedian
- Adam Juretzko (born 1971), German wrestler
- Mariusz Czerkawski (born 1972), ice-hockey player
- Krzysztof Oliwa (born 1973), ice-hockey player
- Piotr Tomasz Nowakowski (born 1974), Polish researcher, university faculty and writer
- Bartosz Karwan (born 1976), footballer
- Piotr Kupicha (born 1979), musician, lead singer of pop-rock band Feel
- Adam Bielecki (born 1983), Polish alpine and high-altitude climber
- Łukasz Sinkiewicz (born 1985), Polish-German footballer
- Michał Brzozowski (born 1988), footballer
- Dawid Tomala (born 1989), race walker, Olympic Champion
- Jakub Świerczok (born 1992), footballer
- Arkadiusz Milik (born 1994), footballer
- Szymon Żurkowski (born 1997), footballer
- Jakub Kiwior (born 2000), footballer
- Krzysztof Zamasz (born 1974), economist and professor

== Twin towns – sister cities ==
Tychy is twinned with:

- Cassino, Italy
- Marzahn-Hellersdorf (Berlin), Germany
- Oberhausen, Germany

== Gallery ==
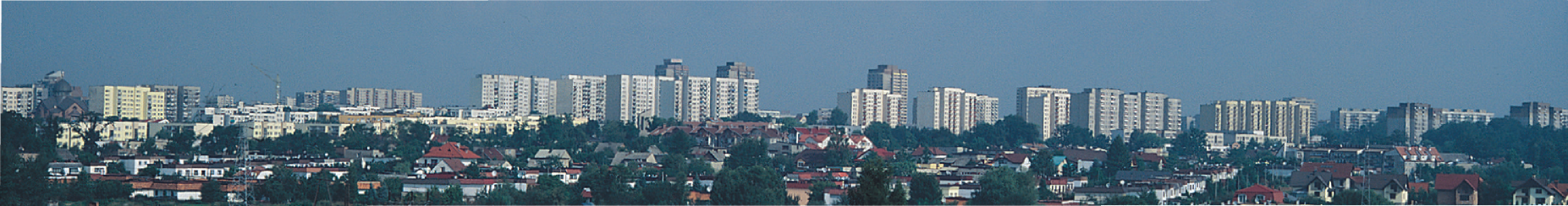
Panorama of Tychy

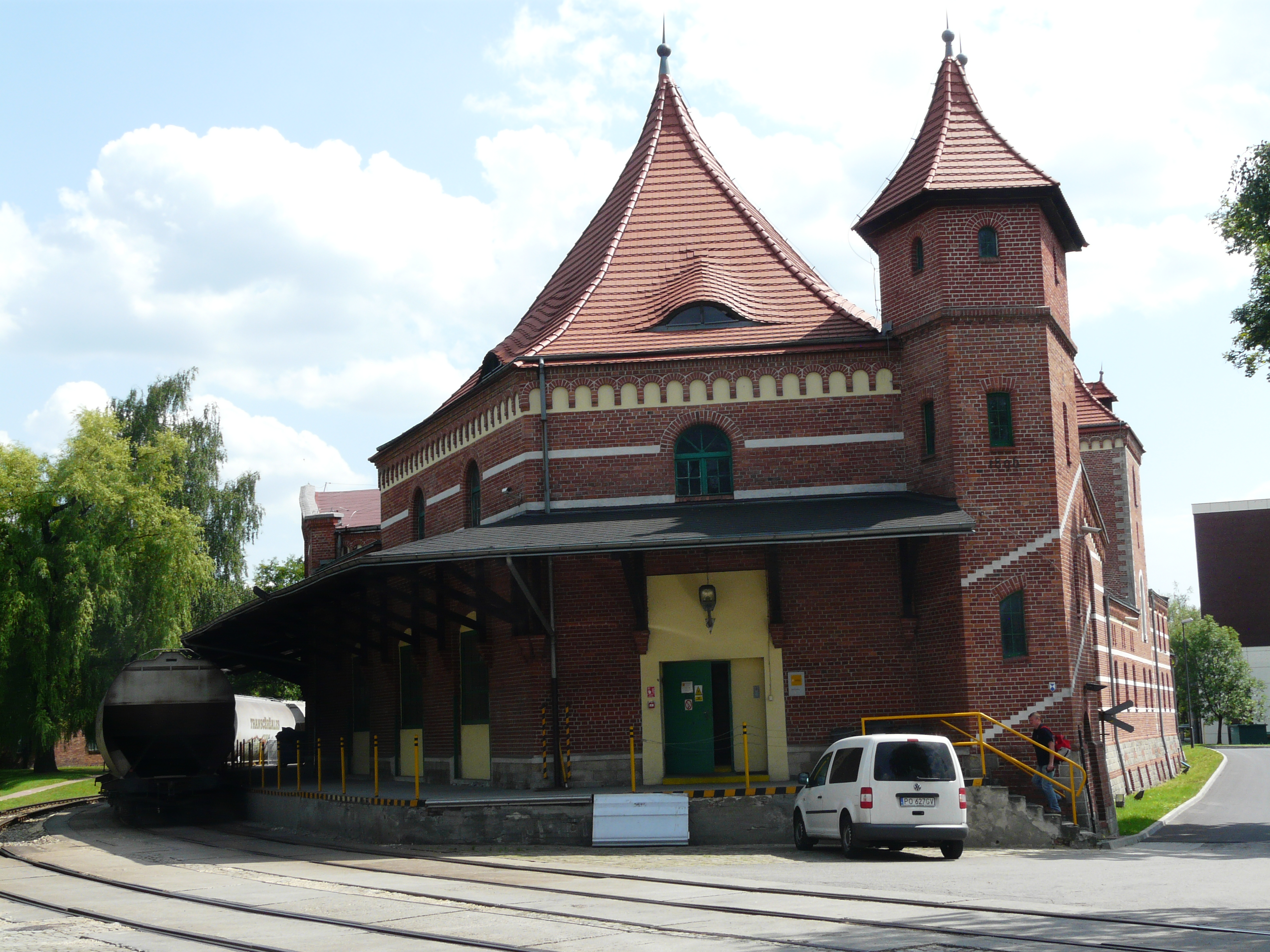
Old railway building at the old brewery

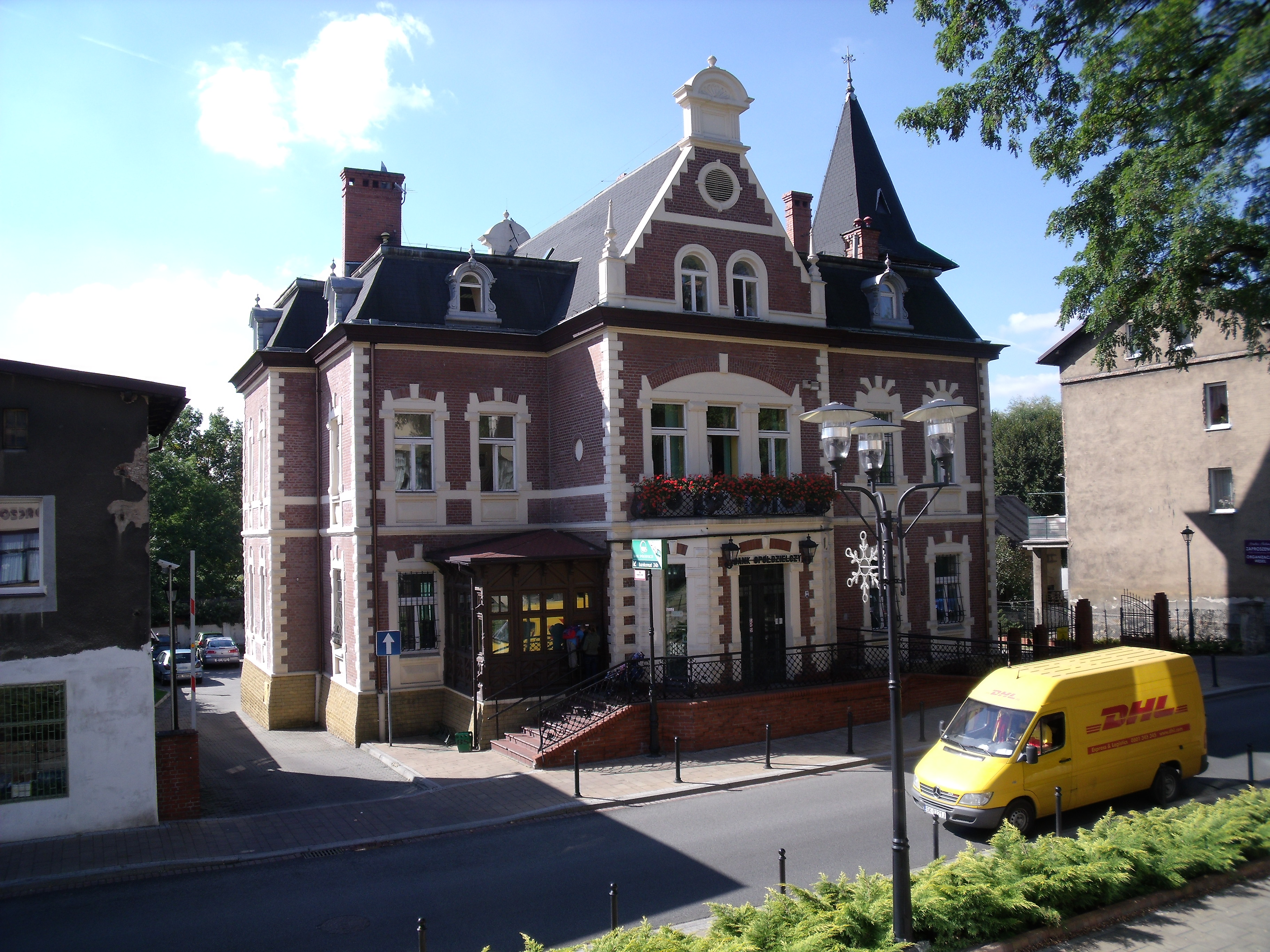
Cooperative bank in the city centre

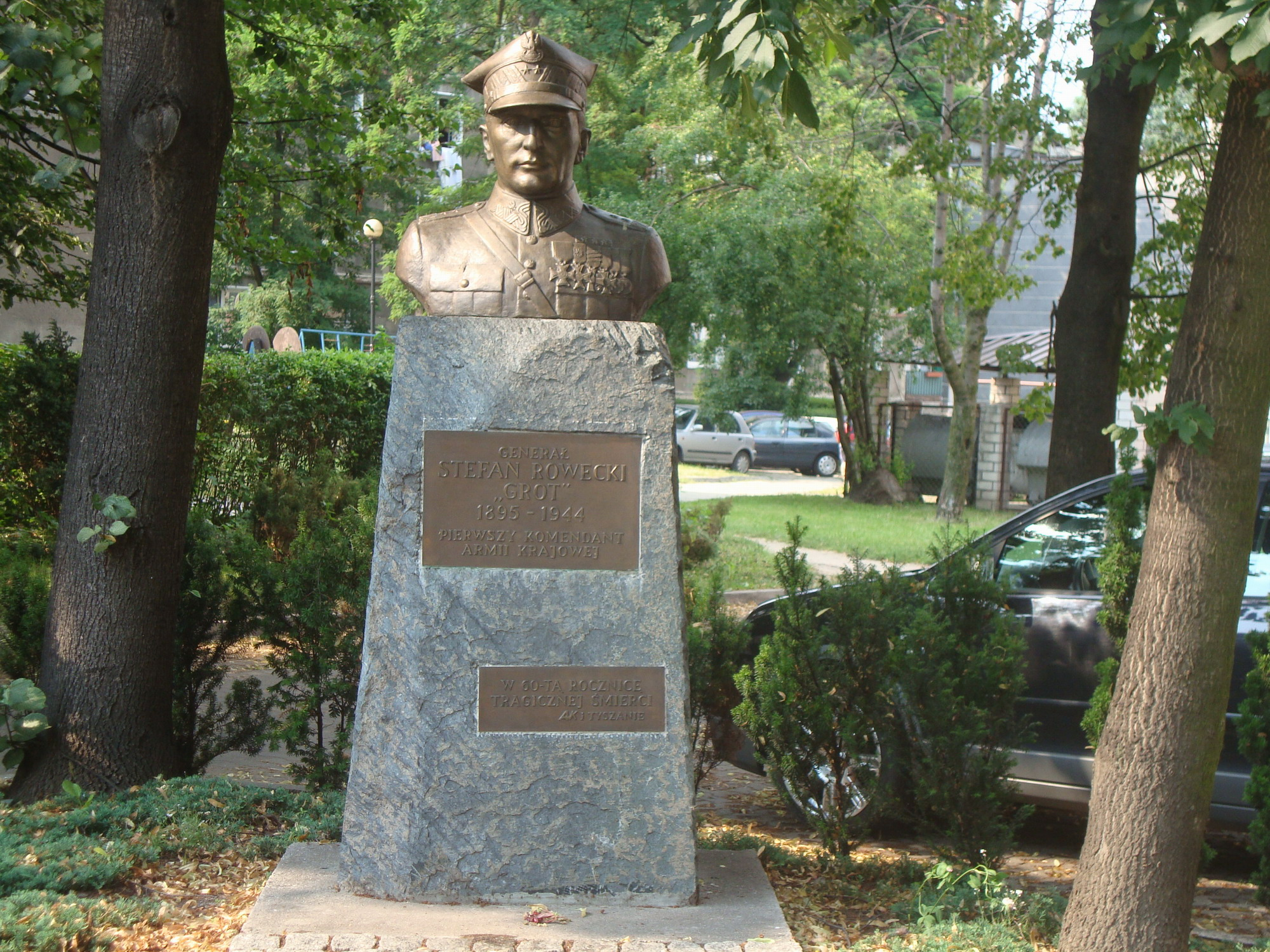
Stefan Rowecki monument

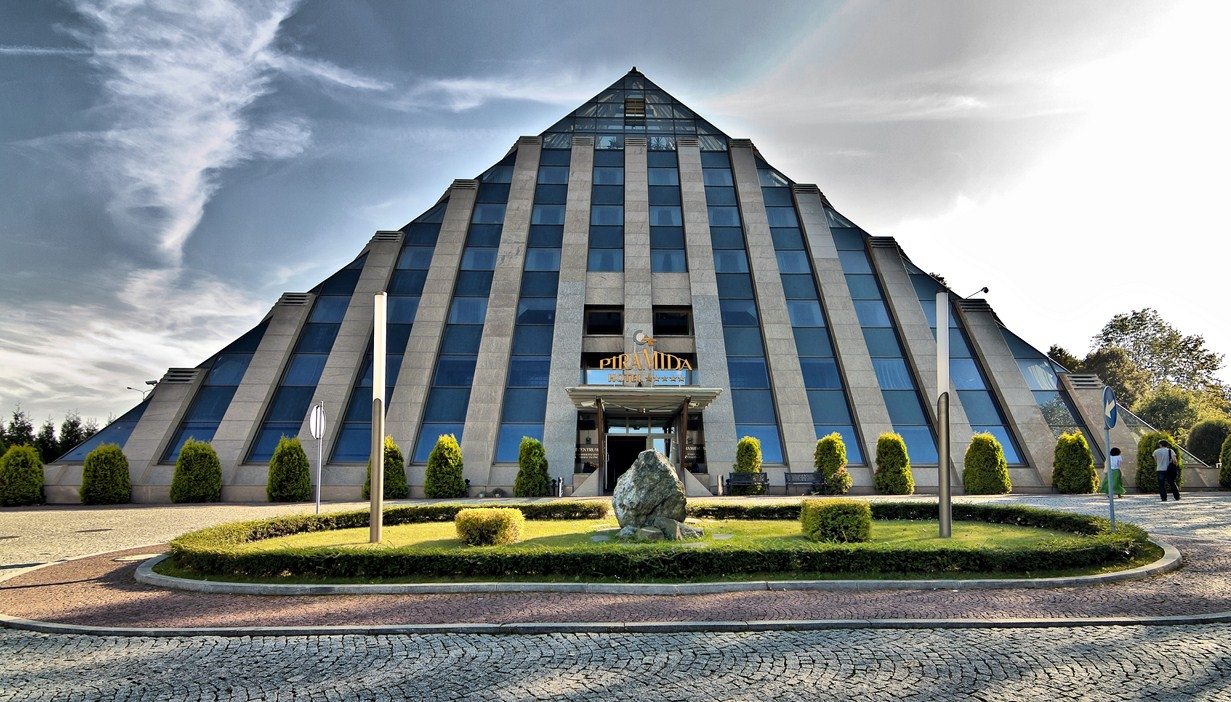
Hotel Piramida

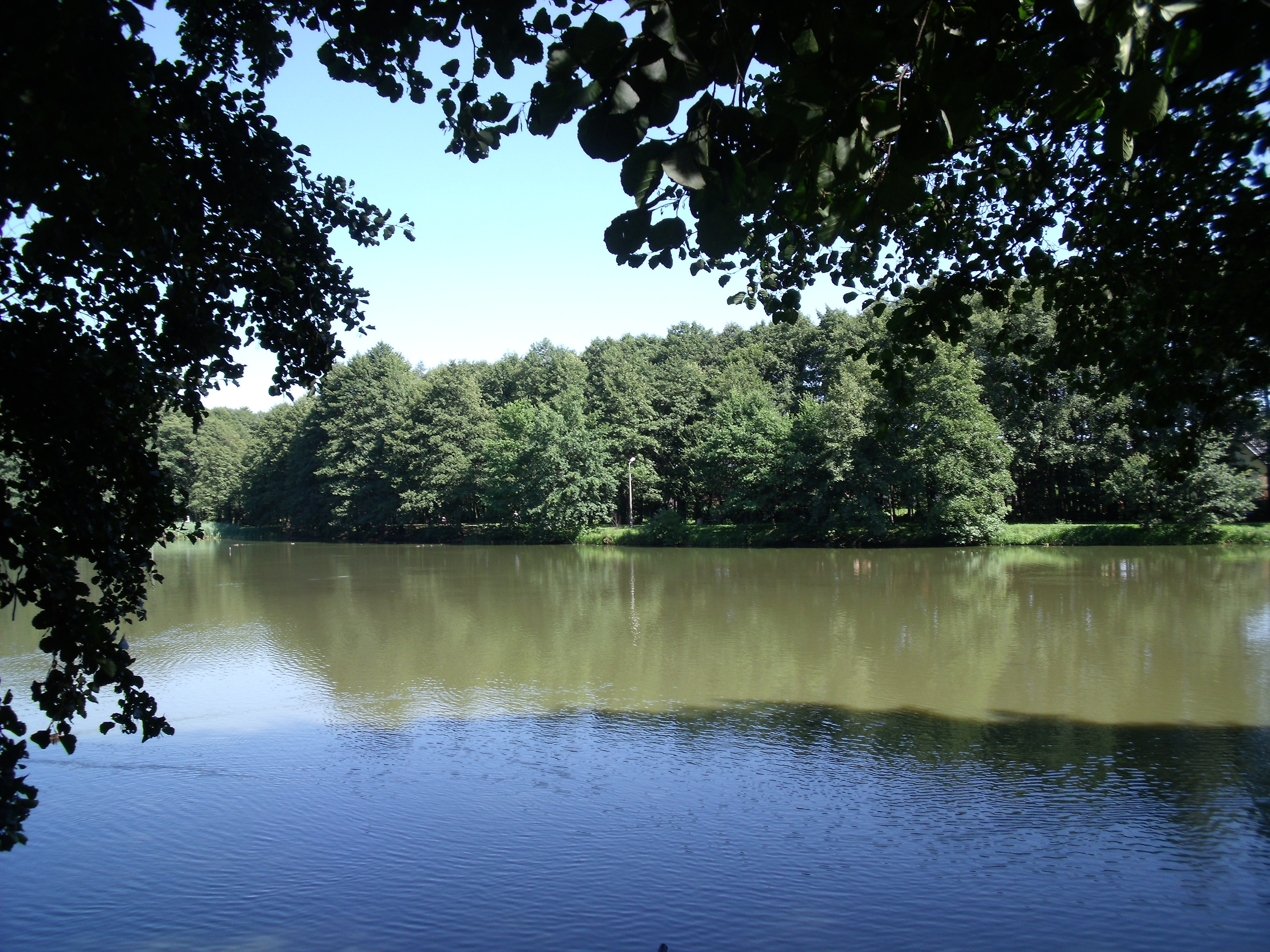
Park Łabędzi

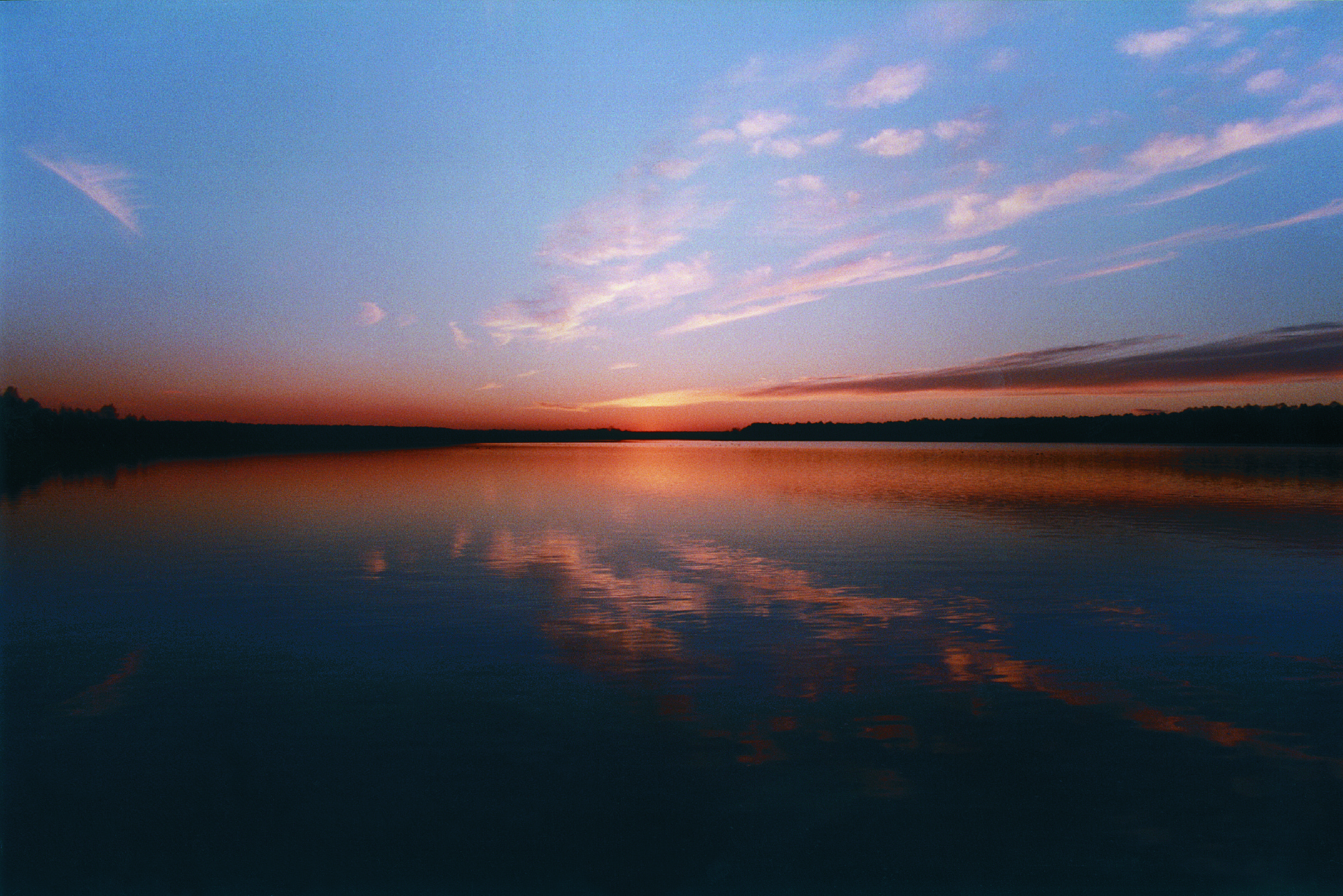
Paprocany Lake

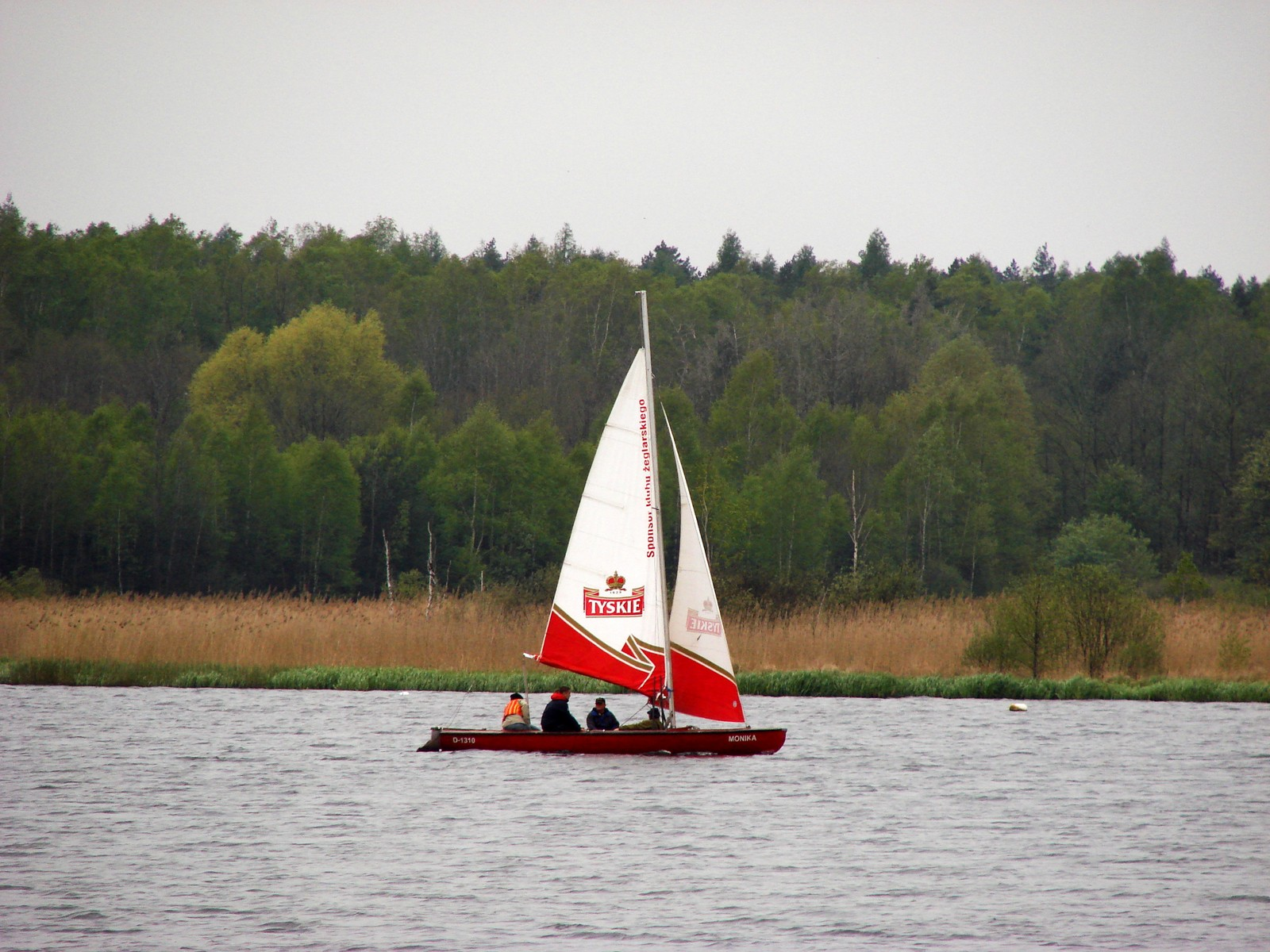
Paprocany Lake

== See also ==
- TTC Tychy
