= Michał Brzozowski =

Polish footballer

Personal information
- Full name: Michał Brzozowski
- Date of birth: 26 March 1988 (age 38)
- Place of birth: Tychy, Poland
- Height: 1.75 m (5 ft 9 in)
- Position: Midfielder

Youth career
- Ruch Chorzów

Senior career*
Years	Team	Apps	(Gls)
2006–2011	Ruch Chorzów	3	(0)
2007–2010	Ruch Chorzów (ME)	32	(0)
2007–2008	→ Rozwój Katowice (loan)	34	(1)
2010–2011	GKS Katowice	13	(0)
2011	→ Odra Wodzisław (loan)	13	(0)
2011	Grunwald Ruda Śląska		
2012	Górnik Wesoła		
2013–2015	Grunwald Ruda Śląska		
- * Club domestic league appearances and goals

Michał Brzozowski (born 26 March 1988) is a Polish former professional footballer who played as a midfielder.

== Career ==
=== Club ===
In August 2007, he was loaned to Rozwój Katowice on a one-year deal. Brzozowski made his Ekstraklasa debut on 27.03.2010.

In February 2011, he was loaned to Odra Wodzisław.

== Honours ==
Ruch Chorzów

- II liga: 2006–07
