= TTC Tychy =

Teacher Training College of Foreign Languages in Tychy
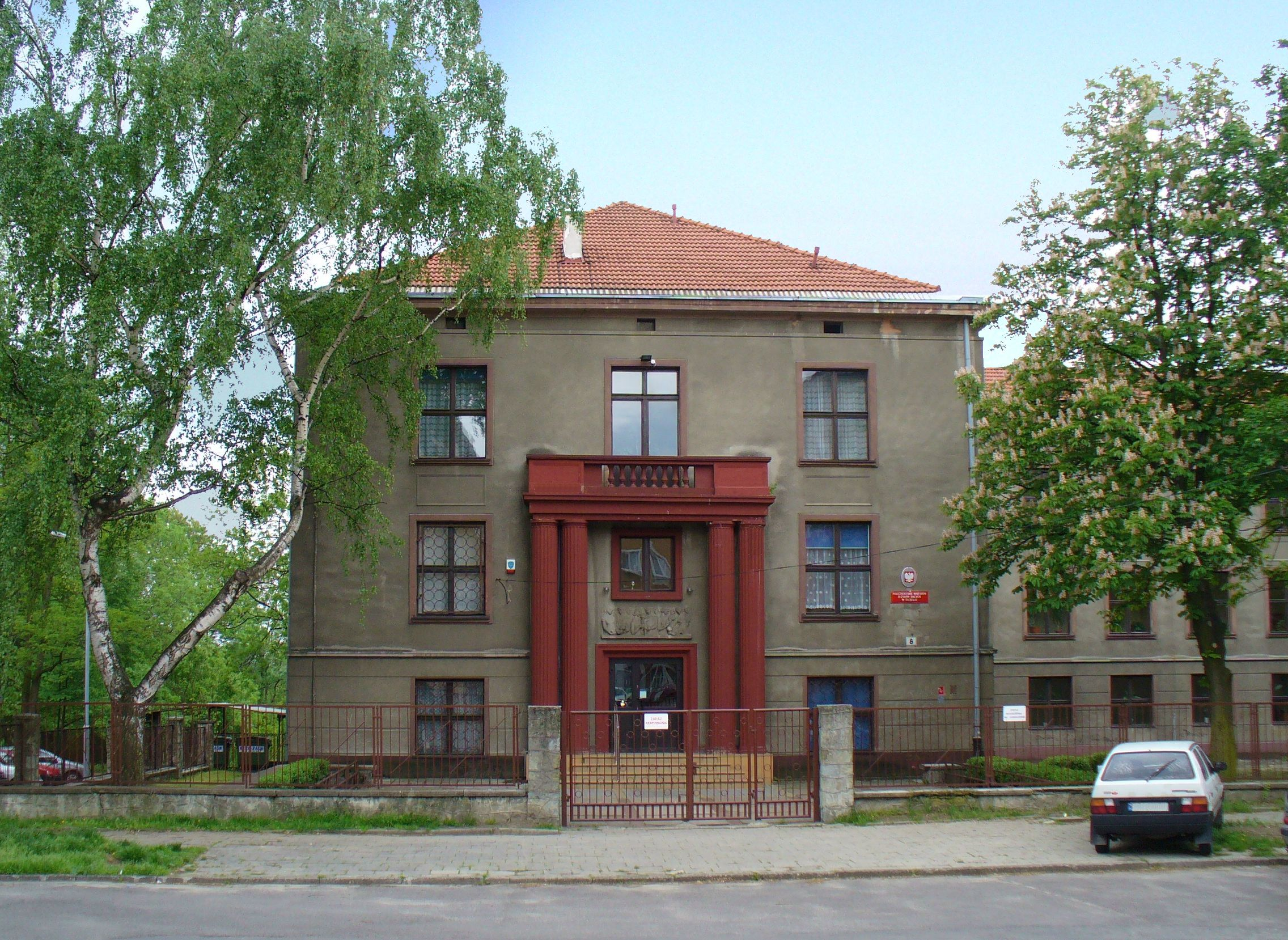

Location
- al. Niepodległości 32; 43-100 Tychy; Poland; 50°7′9″N 18°59′14″E

Information
- Type: State college
- Established: 1990
- School district: Silesia
- Principal: Ewa Fic
- Enrollment: 200
- Website: http://www.tyskiekolegium.pl/

TTC Tychy, located in the Silesia Region

Teacher Training College of Foreign Languages in Tychy (TTC Tychy, Polish: Nauczycielskie Kolegium Języków Obcych w Tychach) was a Polish state college established in 1990. It trained teachers of English and German under the pedagogical guidance of the University of Silesia in Katowice. It ceased operation on 30 September 2015.

Education in the college continued for three years and finished with a diploma dissertation. The graduates were entitled to take the licencjat exam at the University of Silesia. Once the graduates obtain the licencjat degree, they were eligible to pursue a two-year Master of Arts degree.

== Background ==
In 1990 TTC Tychy was the first institution offering higher education in Tychy. It was established to provide foreign language teachers, needed in the newly reformed Polish schools.

The college is located at al. Niepodległości 32. Up to 200 students can study there during the academic year enjoying, among other things, a modern language-lab, a multi-media lecture room, extensive specialist library, a language-teaching oriented computer lab and a gym.

TTC Tychy organizes Tyski Konkurs Języka Angielskiego i Języka Niemieckiego (a foreign language competition) for high school students, and several other events associated with foreign language teaching/learning.
