= Cielmice, Tychy =

District in Silesian Voivodeship, Poland

Coordinates: 50°05′25″N 19°01′00″E

Cielmice
- Dzielnica
- A clock tower in the district

- Coat of arms
- Interactive map of Cielmice
- Country: Poland
- Voivodeship: Silesian
- Metropolis: Upper Silesian–Dąbrowa Basin
- City-county: Tychy
- Absorbed: 1973

Area
  - Total: 4.7 km^{2} (1.8 sq mi)
- SIMC: 0944563
- Website: cielmice.pl

Cielmice (German: Cielmitz) is a dzielnica of Tychy, Silesian Voivodeship, southern Poland. It was an independent village but was absorbed by Tychy in 1973.

== History ==
The village was first mentioned in 1386.

During the political upheaval caused by Matthias Corvinus the land around Pszczyna was taken over by Casimir II, Duke of Cieszyn, who sold it in 1517 to the Hungarian magnates of the Thurzó family, forming the Duchy of Pless. In the accompanying sales document issued on 21 February 1517 the village was mentioned as Tielmicze.

In the War of the Austrian Succession, most of Silesia was conquered by the Kingdom of Prussia, including the village. After World War I in the Upper Silesia plebiscite 423 out of 448 voters in Cielmice voted in favour of joining the Second Polish Republic, against 24 opting for staying in Germany. The village became a part of autonomous Silesian Voivodeship in Second Polish Republic. It was then annexed by Nazi Germany at the beginning of World War II. After the war it was restored to Poland.
