= Krzysztof Zamasz =

Polish economist

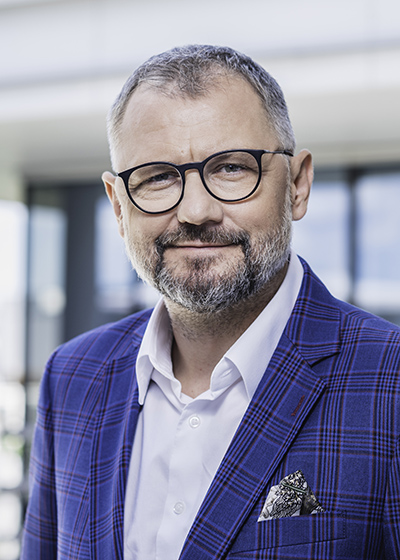
- photo by Alicja Żebruń, 2021
- Born: July 14, 1974 (age 52); Tychy, Polish People's Republic

Academic background
- Education: University of Economics in Katowice; Silesian University of Technology

Krzysztof Zamasz (born July 14, 1974 in Tychy) is a Polish manager, economist, and professor at the Silesian University of Technology and the WSB University in Dąbrowa Górnicza. Member of the Management Board of Tauron Polska Energia S.A. from 2008 to 2012, then President of the Management Board of ENEA S.A. from 2013 to 2015, from 2017 to June 2018 Member of the Management Board of the Upper Silesian and Zagłębie Metropolis.From 2018 to 2019, he was a board member of the European investment fund Luma Holding, where he oversaw the implementation of a Polish investment project in Rwanda and DR of Congo. As the CEO of LuNa Smelter he was responsible for the construction and management of a tin smelter in East Africa on behalf of the holding. From June 2019, Krzysztof Zamasz was Development Advisor to the CEO of the Veolia Group in Poland responsible for developing the energy, water and waste management business. From November 2020 to May 2022 Krzysztof Zamasz was involved in setting up the structure of Veolia Energy Contracting Poland, part of the Veolia Group Poland, as the company's Chairman of the Management Board

== Biography ==
Krzysztof Zamasz is a graduate of Marketing Management and Foreign Languages in Katowice and the College of Controlling in Katowice. He acquired his PhD in Economics from the University of Economics in Katowice in 2007. In 2016, he was awarded his PhD habilitated degree (dr hab.) at the University of Szczecin. He is currently Associate Professor of Management, Administration and Logistics at the Silesian University of Technology in Gliwice and Associate Professor as well as Director of the Institute of Energy Transformation at the WSB University in Dąbrowa Górnicza.

He has been working for power and extraction companies for 25 years, focusing on energy transition projects. In 1999 he was appointed to the Management Board of the Tychy Heat and Power Company Przedsiębiorstwo Energetyki Cieplnej Tychy (PEC Tychy). He was responsible for attracting a strategic investor, Południowy Koncern Energetyczny S.A., to sign an investment agreement with PEC Tychy worth EUR 7.5 million. At PEC Tychy, Krzysztof Zamasz also initiated a EUR 1.5 million project to replace coal-fired boilers with low-emission retort burners. This initiative was financed entirely with external funds.

Between 2007 and 2008 he was President of the Management Board of the Tychy Combined Heat and Power Plant (Elektrociepłownia Tychy), a member of the TAURON Group.

In 2008, Krzysztof Zamasz became Vice President of the Management Board for Commercial Affairs of TAURON Polska Energia S.A. During his four years on the board, he IPO'd the company, expanded its operations to Central and Eastern European markets and developed a new business model for the Group's entire value chain. He participated in the process of transforming the TAURON Group model from a financial holding to an operational holding, in which the parent company assumes responsibility for setting up strategic objectives for the subsidiaries as well as coordinating and implementing key functions within the Group. TAURON Polska Energia launched new products on the market, including TAURON EKO Premium, i.e. energy from 100% renewable sources, in particular small hydroelectric power plants and wind farms, certified by the Polish Association for Energy Certification. TAURON EKO Premium won the EKOLAUR award by the Polish Chamber of Ecology. i.e. energy from 100% renewable sources, in particular small hydroelectric power plants and wind farms, certified by the Polish Association for Energy Certification. TAURON EKO Premium won the EKOLAUR award by the Polish Chamber of Ecology. Thanks to the successful integration, the company acquired more than 1 million individual and corporate customers.

In 2013, Krzysztof Zamasz was appointed CEO of ENEA S.A. He held this position for three years and during his tenure he increased the company's EBITDA from EUR 375 million in 2012 to EUR 507 million in 2015. He was also responsible for the construction of the EUR 1.4 billion 175 MW coal-fired unit and the introduction of corporate governance in the group, as well as the implementation of restructuring and optimization processes that led to savings of EUR143.8 million between 2014 and 2015. He also set up a venture capital fund within the ENEA Group, with the State Treasury as the majority shareholder. He expanded and strengthened the Group's value chain through two major projects: the development of the Group's district heating business through the acquisition of 85% of MPEC Białystok S.A. by way of a tender offer worth EUR 62 million, and the development of the extraction business through the tender offer for the sale of 64.57% of LW Bogdanka coal mine, listed on Warsaw Stock Exchange, which was the fourth largest transaction on the Polish market at the time at EUR €352.4 million.

From 2017 to 25 June 2018, Krzysztof Zamasz was a member of the Board of Directors of the Upper Silesian and Zagłębie Metropolis (GZM), where he was responsible for socio-economic development, international cooperation, project management, and investment. He was involved in talks with representatives of the Chinese government to launch transport from Sławków (Silesia) to China via the Trans-Caspian route. The aim of the project was to improve and speed up cargo deliveries between Europe and China, as well as to include Silesia in the strategic transcontinental transport route. Sławków is currently the westernmost reloading terminal of the international Trans-Caspian transport route.

After leaving the Board of the Metropolis, he became the GZM's Plenipotentiary for Cooperation with Africa, in charge of supporting the strategic goals of the Metropolis by developing business contacts with African countries.

In 2018, Krzysztof Zamasz took on the role of CEO of LuNa Smelter Ltd. in Rwanda on behalf of Luma Holding, a European investment fund, where he was responsible for strategic exploration and mining projects in sub-Saharan Africa. The entire investment portfolio he oversaw was worth EUR 40 million. From March 2019 to August 2019, he was a board member of the Luma Holding fund, responsible for global business development and oversight of mining and metallurgical projects in sub-Saharan Africa.

On 1 August 2019, Krzysztof Zamasz took up the position of Advisor to the CEO on the development of the Veolia Group in Poland, and in June 2020 he became Commercial Director, member of the Management Board of the Veolia Group in Poland, where he is responsible for the development of business lines in the energy, water and waste management sectors, and for the implementation of local heating and power generation projects.

Within the Veolia Group, he oversees the coal and biomass supply chain for the Łódź and Poznań power plants as well as 40 small and medium-sized heating plants (2 million tonnes of coal consumption per year). He was also in charge of imports during the 2022 energy crisis.

Krzysztof Zamasz is responsible for mergers and acquisitions in the Veolia Group Poland, as well as supporting and advising on strategic investments and projects worth over EUR 1.2 billion, including the replacement of coal-fired units in Łódź and Poznań with new gas-fired units (CCGT) (Łódź - 250 MWt and 200 MWe, Poznań - 214 MWt and 114 MWe), and the waste-to-energy plant in Łódź (one of the most advanced RDF / pre-RDF projects in Poland).

As regards waste management projects, in September 2020 he was appointed President of the Management Board of the special purpose vehicle Veolia Nowa Energia, where he is responsible for the expansion of the Łódź EC4 CHP plant with an energy recovery plant (ZOE), which will be powered by 200,000 tonnes of pre-RDF waste sourced from municipal waste per year.

In November 2020, Krzysztof Zamasz was one of the initiators and then the first CEO of Veolia Energy Contracting Poland, a multi-commodity trading company for the Veolia Group in Poland (electricity, heat, gas, fuels, CO_{2}, property rights). During his tenure as CEO of Veolia Energy Contracting Poland [28], he became a member of the Polish Power Exchange and won two major tenders for the supply of electricity to the national railway operator PKP PLK and the City of Gdańsk.

Krzysztof Zamasz actively participates in the economic and social life of Silesia. He has originated and co-organised a series of industry conferences hosted by the WSB University in Dąbrowa Górnicza under the title "Regulated markets - legal, financial and competitive aspects of the energy, heat, water and waste market". More than 350 participants have attended the 4 conferences organized so far, including practitioners from the industry, CEOs and board members of the largest companies in the power and fuel sector, as well as established experts and academics from the fields of law, finance and management.

He is also one of the initiators and a content supervisor / lecturer on the MBA course on Power and Digital Transformation at the Silesian University of Technology with Veolia Polska as a strategic partner.

Krzysztof Zamasz is also a Representative of the National Chamber of Commerce for cooperation with Central and Eastern Africa, member of the International Association for Energy Economics (IAEE), member the International Council for the School of Business at the Silesian University of Technology, member of the Wielkopolska Hydrogen Platform, expert and advisor to the local government of Wielkopolska on low- and zero emission technologies, including hydrogen.

== Publications ==
Krzysztof Zamasz has authored and co-authored many publications on the management of power companies and energy economics, including:

- Rynkowa transformacja sektora usług ciepłowniczych w Polsce - diagnoza, prognoza (PWE, Warszawa 2007),
- Innowacyjne przedsiębiorstwo energetyczne (co-author, Wydawnictwo Adam Marszałek, Toruń 2015),
- New Organization of the Power Industry in Poland as Seen from the European Perspective (China-USA Business Review 2015),
- Economic Efficiency of an Energy Company under the Conditions of Introduction of the Power Market (Wydawnictwo Naukowe PWN, 2015),
- Energy Company in a Competitive Energy Market (PAN, Krakow 2018),
- Efficiency of a Portfolio of Distributed Electricity Generation Resources Managed in a Virtual Power Plant (Wydawnictwo Naukowe PWN, Warsaw 2018),
- Economic efficiency of a power company after the implementation of the capacity market (Wydawnictwo Naukowe PWN, 2019).
- Assessment of support systems for new high-efficiency cogeneration units in Poland, Energy Market, 5 (168)/ 2023[1].
- The Recent Development of High-Efficiency Cogeneration Units in Poland, Forum Scientiae Oeconomia, Vol.11, 2023
