= Wilkowyje =

Coordinates: 50°08′54″N 18°56′51″E

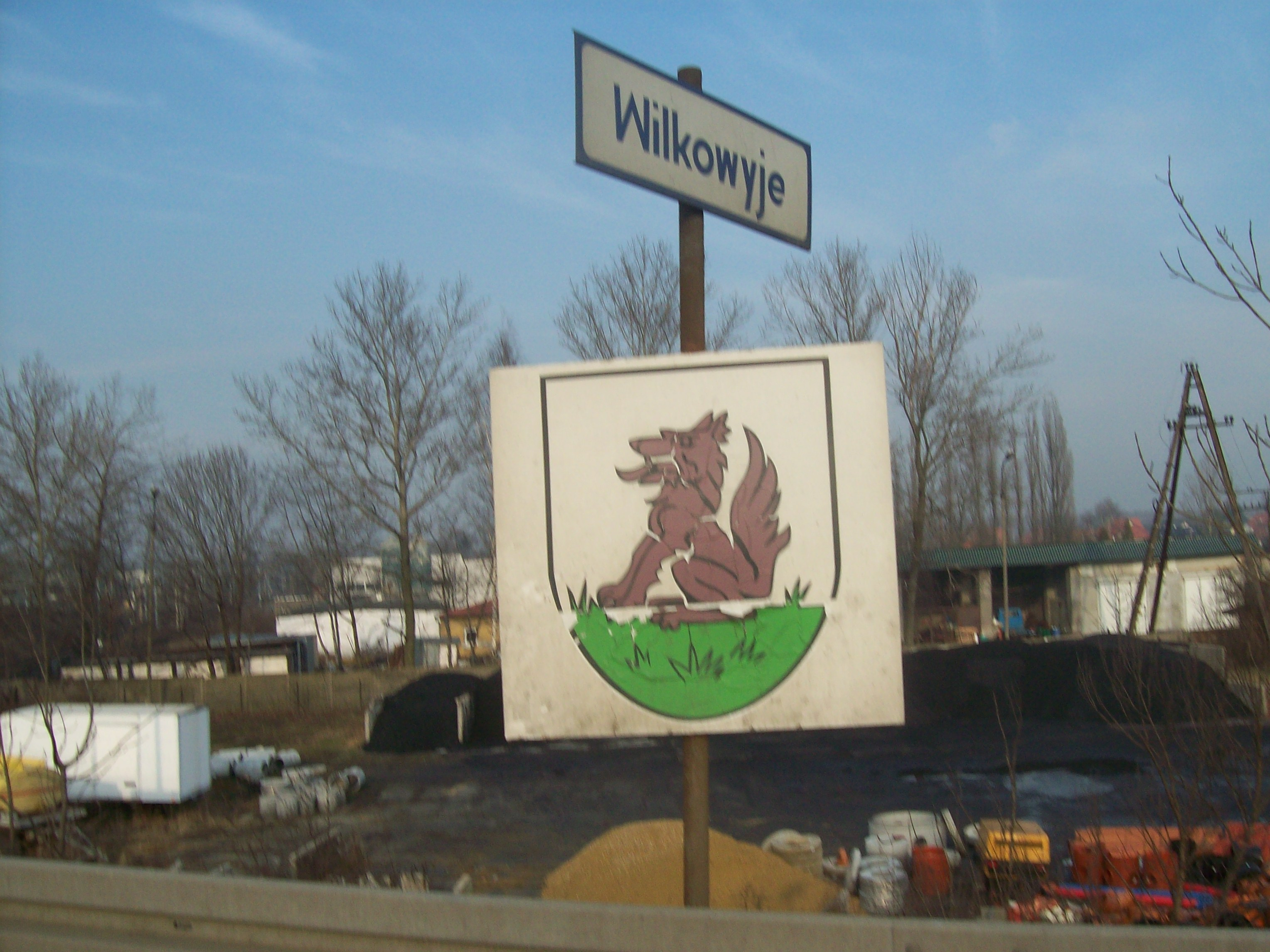
Wilkowyje Coat of Arms on a road welcome sign

Wilkowyje (German: Wilkowy) is a dzielnica (district) of Tychy, Silesian Voivodeship, southern Poland. It was an independent village and a seat of gmina, which was absorbed by Tychy in 1951.

== History ==
The village was first mentioned in 1287.

During the political upheaval caused by Matthias Corvinus the land around Pszczyna was overtaken by Casimir II, Duke of Cieszyn, who sold it in 1517 to the Hungarian magnates of the Thurzó family, forming the Pless state country. In the accompanying sales document issued on 21 February 1517 the village was mentioned as Wlkowicze.

In the War of the Austrian Succession most of Silesia was conquered by the Kingdom of Prussia, including the village. After World War I in the Upper Silesia plebiscite 306 out of 347 voters in Wilkowyje voted in favour of joining Poland, against 40 opting for staying in Germany. The village became a part of autonomous Silesian Voivodeship in Second Polish Republic. It was then annexed by Nazi Germany at the beginning of World War II. After the war it was restored to Poland.
