= Civic Coalition =

Civic Coalition may refer to:

- Civic Coalition (Argentina), a political coalition from 2007 to 2011
- Civic Coalition (Poland), an electoral alliance
- Civic Coalition (party), a Polish political party
- Civic Coalition ARI, an Argentine political party
