= Sittler =

Sittler is a surname that may refer to:

- Darryl Sittler an ice hockey player
- Edward L. Sittler Jr. (Edward Lewis Sittler Jr.) was a Republican member of the U.S. House of Representatives for the 23rd district of Pennsylvania from 1950 to 1952.
- Edward Vieth Sittler a United States-born naturalised German Nazi propagandist
- Esther Sittler (born 1952), French politician
- Joseph Sittler an American Lutheran minister and theologian who taught at the Divinity School of the University of Chicago and the Lutheran School of Theology at Chicago, and brother of Edward Vieth Sittler.
- Walter Sittler a German actor, and son of Edward Vieth Sittler
