= Martin James Monti =

American defector to Nazi Germany (1921–2000)

- Born: October 24, 1921; St. Louis, Missouri, U.S.
- Died: September 11, 2000 (aged 78); Fort Lauderdale, Florida, U.S.
- Known for: Defecting to Nazi Germany & the Waffen-SS in 1944
- Status: Deceased
- Convictions: Federal; Treason (21 counts); Military; Desertion; Theft
- Penalty: Federal; 25 years imprisonment Military; 15 years imprisonment; commuted to time served
- Military career
- Allegiance: United States; Nazi Germany
- Branch: United States Army Air Forces; Waffen-SS; United States Air Force
- Service years: U.S. Army Air Corps 1942–1944; German SS 1944–1945; U.S. Air Force 1947–1948
- Rank: U.S. Army Air Corps – second lieutenant; German SS – Untersturmführer; U.S. Air Force – sergeant
- Unit: SS-Standarte "Kurt Eggers"
- Conflicts: World War II

Martin James Monti (October 24, 1921 – September 11, 2000) was a United States Army Air Forces pilot who defected to Nazi Germany in October 1944, joined the Waffen-SS, and worked as a propagandist and writer. After the end of World War II, he was tried and sentenced for theft and desertion. Monti was granted clemency six months later. However, in 1948, after his involvement in Nazi propaganda was discovered, he was arrested, pleaded guilty to treason, and was sentenced to 25 years in prison.

== Early life ==
Born in St. Louis, Missouri, Monti was one of seven children of prosperous parents. His father, Martin Monti Jr., was an investment broker who had also been born in St. Louis. Martin Monti Jr.'s father had immigrated to the United States from the Italian Graubünden, part of the Italian-speaking area of Switzerland, while his mother was a native of Italy. Martin James Monti's mother, Marie Antoinette Wiethaupt, was born in Missouri to German-American parents. Monti's four brothers all served honorably in the United States Navy during World War II.

In the 1930s, the teenaged Monti was a staunch anti-communist and an enthusiastic admirer of Charles Coughlin, a Roman Catholic priest who made weekly radio broadcasts expressing his anti-capitalist, anti-communist, and antisemitic beliefs, as well as his admiration of the fascist governments of Germany and Italy. His broadcasts attracted millions of listeners until they were ended by the outbreak of World War II in 1939.

Prior to enlisting in the U.S. Army, Monti worked as an aircraft assembler.

== World War II ==
In October 1942, Monti traveled to Detroit, Michigan, to meet and converse with Coughlin. On December 19, 1942, he enlisted in the United States Army Air Forces as an aviation cadet. In 1943 and early 1944, he completed flight training and was commissioned as a flight officer. He qualified on the P-39 Airacobra and the P-38 Lightning, and was promoted to Second Lieutenant.

In August 1944, he was sent to Karachi, in what is now Pakistan. While attached to the 126th Replacement Depot, Monti hitched a ride aboard a C-46 transport aircraft to Cairo, Egypt, and, from there, traveled on to Italy, via Tripoli, Libya. At Foggia, he visited the 82nd Fighter Group, before continuing on to Pomigliano Airfield north of Naples, where the 354th Air Service Squadron prepared aircraft for assignment to line squadrons. While there, he observed that a P-38 Lightning aircraft, an unarmed photographic reconnaissance version of the P-38, was being serviced and would require a test flight after repairs. Monti instead stole the aircraft and flew to Milan on October 13, 1944. According to Monti's testimony, his reason for defecting with the aircraft was "I had been sitting there in India in this replacement battalion for six weeks or more and had grown tired of the inactivity and desired to join the outfit my buddies were in and had been associated with for the past year or more, there was my desire for combat and to be with them". Upon landing, he surrendered the plane to the German forces. Initially treated as an ordinary prisoner of war, he was able to convince his captors, including interrogator Hanns Scharff, that he had defected out of genuine conviction. In November 1944, he was interviewed by American-born Nazi propagandist Edward Vieth Sittler. Sittler deemed him suspect, and Monti was sent to a prisoner-of-war camp. His aircraft was handed over to the Zirkus Rosarius, the Luftwaffe unit that tested Allied aircraft that were captured in flying condition.

== Work as a radio commentator ==
Despite Sittler's assessment, Monti was later released from the prison camp after convincing the Germans of his sincerity. In late 1944, Monti made a microphone test at the recording studio of SS-Standarte Kurt Eggers, a propaganda unit of the Waffen-SS, under the direction of Gunter d'Alquen, in Berlin. Monti was referred to the unit by SS-Hauptsturmführer Peter Delaney (Delaney would be killed in action near the end of the war), a French-American volunteer in the Waffen-SS. In 1945, Monti participated in a radio program titled "The Round Table Conference", again at the SS-Standarte Kurt Eggers recording studio. The program consisted of political propaganda, in the form of discussion and commentary on political issues, and was broadcast by the Reichs-Rundfunk-Gesellschaft, the German state radio organization. While in Germany, Monti operated under various aliases, including "Martin Wiethaupt". Having been instructed by the Germans that it was necessary to maintain his anonymity, he was initially given the working alias of "Martin Roberts". Monti did not approve of the name and, instead, opted to use his mother's maiden name, so that if he were ever captured or killed, he could potentially be traced and identified. During this period in radio broadcasting, he came into contact with Mildred Gillars, the American broadcaster widely known as "Axis Sally", who took an immediate dislike to Monti and angrily threatened to resign from her position rather than work with him. Gillars later testified at her treason trial that Monti came into the Berlin studio one day and simply said "hello" to her. "I just looked at him, turned around and walked out without speaking," Gillars said. She then approached Adelburt Houben, her supervising radio official, to whom she gave an ultimatum: "That man (Monti) is a spy or a traitor, either he must go or I will." Houben denied her demand that Monti be removed, whereupon she said "Then I've made my last broadcast." However, Monti's lack of ability and experience as a radio commentator ensured that he made only a few broadcasts and, upon his re-assignment, Gillars returned to broadcasting shortly after.

== Membership in the Waffen-SS ==
While employed in the production of propaganda, Monti became a regular visitor to Sittler's home. Both would later join SS-Standarte Kurt Eggers. Monti was commissioned with the rank of SS-Untersturmführer, equivalent to his rank in the U.S. Army, but Sittler, with no military experience, was enlisted as a Private. While in the SS, Monti participated in the creation of a propaganda leaflet to be distributed by the Wehrmacht and among Allied prisoners of war. Ordered, with Sittler, to Kampfsender Viktoria in the Italian Alps in April 1945, the two parted company when Monti was able to board a crowded train in Berlin due to his officer's uniform while Sittler was forced to wait for a later train. Upon arrival in Milan, Monti approached the first U.S. Army unit he encountered, while still wearing his SS uniform, from which by this point, he had removed all insignia and identifying marks. He was interrogated by U.S. Army officers, initially under the assumption he was a German prisoner of war. He did not reveal his personal association with the SS or that he had stolen the P-38 aircraft to defect to the Nazis, and, upon further questioning, only that he had stolen the aircraft as a result that "he was bored" and so that he could "personally fight the Germans himself."

== Post-war trials ==
During his post-war trials, Monti claimed he had stolen the plane to fight the Germans, was shot down, and joined with partisans, who gave him the SS uniform. His claims were largely believed, resulting in him being court-martialed solely for theft of the aircraft and desertion. On August 6, 1945, he was sentenced to 15 years in prison. However, on February 11, 1946, Monti's sentence was suspended by Harry S. Truman, after Walter C. Ploeser pleaded for leniency on behalf of Monti's parents. As a condition of his commutation, Monti was required to reenlist in the Army Air Forces (later that year, the independent United States Air Force) as a private, which he did on February 11, 1947. During an interview prior to his arrest, he told the St. Louis Post-Dispatch that he pretended to be a Nazi "to gain their confidence. I don't like communism and I don't like Russia, but I couldn't be a Nazi. I couldn't have become a Nazi in a year."

Meanwhile, Sittler was interrogated by American investigator Anthony Cuomo, and asked Cuomo whether he knew a P-38 pilot named Martin Weithaupt. Cuomo had in fact interrogated Monti. On May 22, 1946, Special Attorney Clyde E. Gooch in Frankfurt, Germany, wrote to Assistant Attorney General Theron L. Caudle in Washington DC calling for Monti's prosecution.

Sittler was brought to the United States in 1946 by the Department of Justice as a witness in the 1947 trial of Douglas Chandler and the 1948 trial of Robert Henry Best. Monti, who also knew Chandler and Best, refused to testify against them. He had been summoned on November 18 to the Department of Justice where he was identified as Martin Weithaupt by Sittler, Sittler's wife, and former Nazi propagandist colleagues Margaret Eggers, Loretta Grunau Kapke, and seven others brought to the United States as witnesses against Chandler and Best. Monti had reached the rank of sergeant by the time he was honorably discharged on January 26, 1948. Only minutes later, the Federal Bureau of Investigation arrested him at Mitchel Field, New York, and charged him with treason for the propaganda activities performed as "Martin Wiethaupt". On October 14, 1948, a federal grand jury in Brooklyn indicted him for 21 acts of treason committed between October 13, 1944, and May 8, 1945, the day hostilities in Europe ended.

On January 17, 1949, Monti pleaded guilty, surprising the prosecutors and the court, which had prepared for a lengthy trial. Monti's lawyers had advised him to plead guilty, saying there was no hope of an acquittal and that his status as a military officer would constitute a major aggravating factor. They warned him that if he went to trial, he could face life in prison or even execution.

Because of the seriousness of the charges, and in light of Article III, Section 3 of the United States Constitution, the court required testimony despite his guilty plea, and, according to The New York Times, "Without hesitation, Monti took the witness chair" where he admitted to all the charges. Asked by the judge if he had acted "voluntarily", Monti answered "Yes". His attorney then asked for leniency, citing his upbringing in an extremist and isolationist environment that "fanatically imbued" him to identify Soviet Russia and Communism as the nation's principal enemy. Despite his attorney's appeal for leniency, Monti was sentenced to 25 years in prison and ordered by the judge to pay a fine of $10,000.

== Prison sentence ==
Monti served his sentence in Leavenworth Penitentiary, Kansas. Shortly after beginning his sentence, he went on a hunger strike and was subsequently put in solitary confinement. His sentence was later extended by 12 months for breaking into the prison kitchen and stealing food. In 1951, Monti tried to withdraw his guilty plea, insisting he had "no treasonable intent" when he had flown into "enemy territory". He claimed that he had been pressured by his attorneys to plead guilty to avoid a possible death sentence. In court, Monti was asked, "Well, did you say that Germany was on the right side and the U.S. was on the wrong side?" He replied, "Possibly." Monti's appeal was rejected. He continued to serve his sentence until he was paroled in 1960.

== Post-prison life ==
In 1963, Monti attempted again to have his charges of treason reversed in a Brooklyn Federal Court, claiming he "only went to Germany to assassinate Adolf Hitler and end the war". His reversal attempt was denied. By that time, Monti was working as a factory supervisor, making $1.50-an-hour. He remained on parole until January, 1974. He lived out the remainder of his life in Fort Lauderdale, Florida, in relative obscurity, until his death on September 11, 2000. He was buried at Sacred Heart Cemetery in Florissant, Missouri, alongside his parents and two of his brothers.
