= Edward Sittler =

Edward Sittler may refer to:

- Edward L. Sittler Jr., U.S. Representative from Pennsylvania
- Edward Vieth Sittler, American musician and educator who renounced his citizenship and worked for the Nazis as a broadcaster
