= Murder of Tina Isa =

1989 honor killing of an American teen in St. Louis, Missouri

Palestina Zein "Tina" Isa
- Born: December 3, 1972; Mato Grosso, Brazil
- Died: November 6, 1989 (aged 16); St. Louis, Missouri, U.S.
- Cause of death: Murder by stabbing
- Resting place: Sacred Heart Cemetery; Florissant, Missouri
- Education: Roosevelt High School
- Occupations: Student at Roosevelt High School, part-time fast food worker
- Known for: Being the victim of an honor killing in St. Louis

Palestina Zein "Tina" Isa (Arabic: فلسطين زين عيسى, December 3, 1972 – November 6, 1989) was a Palestinian/Brazilian-American teenage girl murdered in an honor killing in St. Louis, Missouri, by her parents, Zein and Maria Isa.

Her death was recorded on audiotape during Federal Bureau of Investigation (FBI) surveillance on Zein Isa due to his association with the Abu Nidal Organization (ANO). He and his wife were both convicted of first-degree murder and sentenced to death. Zein Isa died of diabetes before he could be executed. Maria Isa was later resentenced to life imprisonment and died in prison.

== Background ==
Zein Isa
- Born: Zein al-Abdeen Hassan Isa; June 3, 1931; Mandatory Palestine
- Died: February 17, 1997 (aged 65); Potosi Correctional Center, Potosi, Missouri, U.S.
- Spouse: Maria Isa
- Children: 7
- Status: Deceased
- Motive: Honor killing
- Conviction: First degree murder
- Penalty: Death

Details
- Victims: Tina Isa
- Date: November 6, 1989
- Location: St. Louis
- Weapon: Boning knife

Maria Isa
- Born: Maria Matias; August 10, 1943; Santa Catarina, Brazil
- Died: April 30, 2014 (aged 70); Vandalia, Missouri, U.S. (presumably in Women's Eastern Reception, Diagnostic and Correctional Center)
- Status: Deceased
- Conviction: First degree murder
- Penalty: Death; commuted to life imprisonment without possibility of parole

Palestina Zein Isa, named after Palestine, was born on December 3, 1972, in Mato Grosso, Brazil. The youngest of seven siblings, she lived in a southern portion of the City of St. Louis in an apartment complex, and attended Dewey Junior High School and Roosevelt High School in St. Louis. Her father Zein Isa was a Muslim Palestinian who originated from Beitin, West Bank. Her mother Maria Isa was Brazilian and Roman Catholic, of Italian, German, and some Amerindian descent. She learned Arabic and Portuguese from her parents and Spanish during her time living in Puerto Rico.

Zein al-Abdeen Hassan Isa, born on June 3, 1931, was the third son of a farmer. While a teenager, he married a woman named Foiziya, his double first cousin. In the 1950s, Zein left Palestine, emigrating with members of neighboring families. He first lived in the south of Brazil and, while on a business trip to Rondonópolis, Mato Grosso, met Maria Matias (born August 10, 1943), a native of Mato Grosso who had been born in Santa Catarina. She was of Italian and Native Brazilian descent.

On February 6, 1963, the two married despite the opposition of Maria's parents. Zein did not reveal to Maria that she was his second wife until after they had married. They moved to Raleigh, North Carolina in the fall of 1963, then to Paterson, New Jersey, followed by a move to Arecibo, Puerto Rico, then back to Rondonópolis, and finally to Cáceres, Mato Grosso. Tina was born in Mato Grosso. The family moved back to Puerto Rico, living in Arecibo until moving to Isabela one year later. During this time, the father, without the mother, lived with his children in the West Bank for periods of time.

In 1980, Zein became a naturalized citizen of the United States. The entire family moved to Beitin in the West Bank when Tina was five. The family came to St. Louis around 1986 and owned a grocery store there. Tina began learning English after arriving in St. Louis, where her friends gave her the nickname "Tina". In 1991, Tim Bryant of the St. Louis Post-Dispatch wrote in regard to the parents, "Neither speaks English well."

Tina's relationship with her father deteriorated after she turned 14; in earlier years they had enjoyed a closer relationship. She listened to American popular music such as hip hop, dance, rap, R&B, and rock. Tina Isa's ambition was to become a pilot after taking aeronautical engineering courses; she intended to pursue this training at Parks College of Engineering, Aviation and Technology (part of St. Louis University). Zein wanted to arrange Tina as a marriage partner to a man from his hometown. Isa's elder sisters stated their dislike of her lifestyle. Her family sent people to extract her from a prom dance she attended. When her family learned that she, since January 1989, was engaged in a romantic relationship with a 20-year-old African-American, Cliff Walker, Tina's parents grew even angrier. Zein Isa held grudges against African-Americans since he believed Palestinian businesspeople had been targeted by black criminals.

Prior to his daughter's murder, Zein made telephone calls stating that Tina had damaged the honor of his family and needed to die. On the day of her death, she worked her first day at a Wendy's fast food restaurant; the family also opposed the idea of her not working for the family's grocery business. Ellen Harris, author of Guarding the Secrets, wrote that "The problem was that Tina thought of herself as American or hyphenated-American, not as Arab."

== Death ==
Tina's murder took place at the Delor Park Apartments, in her family's residence. Isa's boyfriend walked her home after the first day of her job. Initially, her parents criticized her for having the outside job and later stated a belief that she was doing something else instead of working. Zein Isa stabbed his daughter with a boning knife. One of her lungs, her liver, and her heart were severely damaged by six blows to her chest. Maria Isa assisted Zein by holding Tina. FBI agents were not at the surveillance unit when the killing occurred.

Tina Isa was buried at Sacred Heart Cemetery in Florissant, Missouri, reportedly in a bridal gown. Her Brazilian mother said unmarried girls and women in Brazil who die are buried accordingly. The family intentionally did not provide notice of the funeral to the media to ensure that only people from the family, the local Palestinian community, and people from Beitin attended. They expressly did not want Tina's boyfriend to attend. FBI agents secretly monitored and photographed the proceedings.

== Investigation, arrest, and trial ==
Zein Isa was a member of the Abu Nidal Organization, which at the time he murdered his daughter, was plotting to bomb the Israeli Embassy in Washington, D.C. Harris wrote that "His daughters had long worried about Zein's ANO activities."

A crucial factor in his trial was the fact that the FBI had bugged Zein's house on a FISA order in connection with his suspected terrorist activities and, as such, had recorded Tina's murder on an audio cassette. This was especially important in confirming the fact that Maria was an active participant in the murder, and that Zein's claim of self-defense against Tina was false. Zein had accused Tina of asking for $5,000 and of grabbing a knife, and Isa's lawyers related to the jury that Tina had kicked her father in the leg, which they stated had previously sustained injuries, and that she had wielded a meat cleaver as a weapon.

The New York Times wrote in 1991, "Since the F.B.I. has refused to discuss the tapes, only some of which were used at the trial, it is not clear whether the authorities could have intervened to prevent the killing." FBI officials stated that several of Isa's statements before the killing were empty threats, and that this is why the agency took no action before Tina died. The state-level prosecutor, Dee Joyce-Hayes, used several FBI tapes as evidence in the trial against Zein and Maria Isa. Maria's lawyers argued that Maria had favored Tina in family disputes and that she could not have participated in the murder. On October 25, 1991, Zein and Maria Isa were convicted of first-degree murder. The jury deliberated less than four hours before reaching their verdict. On December 20, 1991, Zein and Maria Isa were sentenced to death by the jury; Circuit Judge Charles A. Shaw stated "Culture is no excuse for murder. I see no reason to deviate from the jury's recommendation."

In April 1993, Zein was indicted by the FBI in connection with his terrorist activities within the Abu Nidal Organization. The federal prosecutors issuing the indictment accused Zein of killing Tina partly because he feared she could expose his ANO activities. The charges were later dropped, as he was already on death row for his daughter's murder.

The case received media coverage in Brazil. Zein was to be sent to Potosi Correctional Center in Potosi, Missouri, while Maria was to be sent to the Jefferson City, Missouri-area Renz Prison. On February 17, 1997, Zein died in prison of complications related to diabetes. Maria's death sentence was commuted to life imprisonment without parole; she died on April 30, 2014, in a Vandalia, Missouri prison at the age of 70 from apparent natural causes.

== Aftermath ==
As a result of the case, some Palestinian families residing in the U.S. sent their children back to Palestine to avoid their undergoing Americanization.

== In popular culture ==
A book titled Guarding the Secrets, written by Ellen Harris, was published in 1995 which documents the murder. In the book, she stated a journalist from Palestine compared the murder to the ancient biblical story of Dinah. The case was depicted in the Forensic Files season 8 episode "Honour Thy Father" which aired on July 30, 2005. The case was also featured on an episode of Arrest & Trial.

== See also ==
- Honor killing in the United States
