= Nikola (TV series) =

- Genre: Sitcom
- Created by: Ken Cinnamon; Karen Wengrod
- Written by: Gunther Burghagen
- Directed by: Ulli Baumann; Christoph Schnee
- Starring: Mariele Millowitsch; Walter Sittler; Oliver Reinhard; Eric Benz; Friederike Grasshoff; Alexander Schottky
- Country of origin: Germany
- Original language: German
- No. of seasons: 9
- No. of episodes: 110

Production
- Executive producer: Gunther Burghagen
- Running time: 25
- Production company: Sony Pictures Film- und Fernsehproduktion

Original release
- Network: RTL Television
- Release: 12 September 1997 – 16 December 2005

Related
- Ritas Welt; Das Amt; Und tschüss!

Nikola is a German television sitcom that premiered on 12 September 1997 on RTL Television.

== Synopsis ==
After her divorce, Nikola Vollendorf moves to Cologne together with her children Peter and Stephanie. Nikola starts to work at Rheintal hospital as head nurse at the orthopedic department. The show centers around her arguments with Chief Physician Dr. Schmidt, who is not only the head of her department, but also lives in the same building as Nikola. Although they are arguing most of the time, Nikola and Dr. Schmidt start to trust each other and build a relationship.

== Characters ==
=== Main characters ===
- Nikola Vollendorf (Mariele Millowitsch) is a nurse at the Rheintalklinik hospital. She lives in Cologne together with her children. She is often seen arguing with Dr. Schmidt.
- Dr. Robert Schmidt (Walter Sittler) is Chief Physician at the Rheintalklinik. He is very self-centered and arrogant and always looking for his personal advantage. The most important thing in his life is his Ferrari. He is usually surrounded by his three assistants Dr. Charlotte Borstel, Dr. Frank Brummel (Roland Jankowsky) and Dr. Thomas Pfund (Alexander Schottky).
- Tim Schenk (Oliver Reinhard) is Nikola's friend and neighbour. He is gay and he sometimes cross-dresses. He is working in the administration of the hospital, but often just spies on other people shares gossip.
- Peter Vollendorf (Eric Benz) is the oldest child of Nikola. He was 15 years old in season one. He is a bad student and guitarist in a punk rock band.
- Stephanie Vollendorf (Friederike Grasshoff) is Nikola's second child. She is smart and like her mother sometimes sarcastic.
- Dr. Thomas Pfund (Alexander Schottky) is Dr. Schmidt's most loyal assistant. He admires him so much that he would do anything to be him.

=== Recurring characters ===
- Dr. Charlotte Borstel (Kerstin Thielemann) is one of Schmidt's assistants. She has a crush on him.
- Elke (Jenny Elvers) is Nikola's best friend during season 1-3. She is pretty and has many relationships with men.
- Erik Berg (Guntbert Warns) is administrative director in the hospital from season 4 on and a friend of Schmidt.

== See also ==
- List of German television series
