= Mother Night =

1962 novel by Kurt Vonnegut

- Cover art of first edition (paperback)
- Author: Kurt Vonnegut
- Cover artist: Leo and Diane Dillon
- Language: English
- Genre: Dark humour, metafiction
- Publisher: Fawcett Publications/Gold Medal Books
- Publication date: 1962
- Publication place: United States
- Media type: Print (hardcover & paperback)
- Pages: 192
- ISBN: 978-0-385-33414-3

Mother Night is a novel by American author Kurt Vonnegut, first published in February 1962.

The novel takes the form of the fictional memoirs of Howard W. Campbell Jr., an American, who moved to Germany in 1923 at age 11 and later became a well-known playwright, Nazi propagandist, and American spy. The story of the novel is narrated (through the use of metafiction) by Campbell himself, writing his memoirs while awaiting trial for war crimes in an Israeli prison, heavily influenced by Adolf Eichmann's time on trial in Jerusalem. Campbell also appears briefly in Vonnegut's later novel Slaughterhouse-Five.

== Background ==
The title of the book comes from a passage in Goethe's Faust, where Mephistopheles gives the name Mother Night to the primordial Darkness before the Light of creation, and hopes and predicts that the Light, and creation, must soon fail and the Darkness return.

Vonnegut told Charlie Rose in 1996 that he was paid $3,000 for it (equivalent to $24,000 in 2025) at a time when he "needed the money", and also explained the idea for the story as follows:

I got the idea at a cocktail party on Cape Cod. [...] I lived there for 20 years, and I met a spymaster. The guy had been a spymaster during the Second World War, and he was complaining about spy films, that they made no sense. He said, "Any time you have an agent inside an enemy country, this is a very sick person you are dealing with."

He also explains the inspiration for Campbell's character:

The British actually had a treacherous citizen who broadcast for the Nazis, Lord Haw-Haw, and he was hanged by the British after the war for treason. I said, "All right, suppose an American does this."

== Plot summary ==
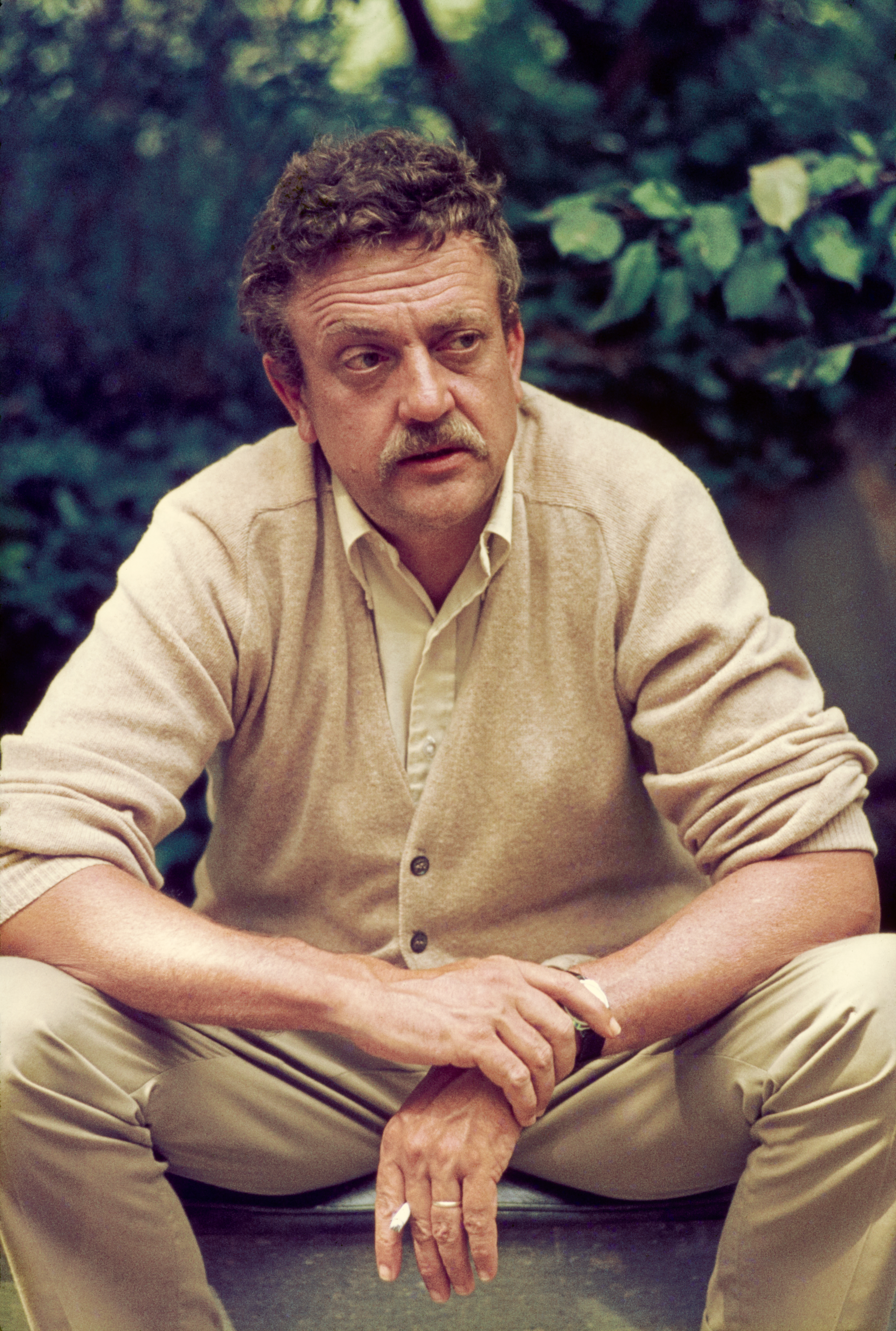
A 1965 photograph of Vonnegut by Bernard Gotfryd

The novel is framed as the memoir of Howard W. Campbell, Jr. He is writing it while imprisoned and waiting for his war crimes trial for his actions as a Nazi propagandist. Campbell, an American who moved to Germany with his parents at age 11, recounts his childhood as the Nazi Party is consolidating its power. Instead of leaving the country with his parents, Campbell continues his career as a playwright, his only social contacts being Nazis. Being of sufficiently "Aryan" heritage, Campbell becomes a member of the party in name only. He is politically apathetic, caring only for his art and his wife Helga, who is also the starring actress in all of his plays.

Campbell is later approached by Frank Wirtanen, an agent of the U.S. War Department. Wirtanen wants Campbell to spy as a double agent for the United States in the impending world war. Campbell rejects the offer, but Wirtanen quickly adds that he wants Campbell to think about it. Eventually, he accepts. Once the war starts, Campbell begins to make his way up through Joseph Goebbels' Propaganda Ministry, eventually becoming the "voice" of broadcasts aimed at converting Americans to the Nazi cause (a parallel to the real broadcaster Dr. Edward Vieth Sittler). Unbeknownst to the Nazis, all of the idiosyncrasies of Campbell's speeches—deliberate pauses, coughing, etc.—are part of the coded information he is passing to the American Office of Strategic Services (OSS). Campbell never discovers, nor is he ever told, the information that he is sending.

About halfway through the war, Helga goes to the Eastern Front to entertain German troops. Campbell is extremely distraught when he hears that the camp Helga visited in Crimea has been overrun by Soviet troops and she is presumed dead. In early 1945, just before the Red Army captures Berlin, Campbell visits his in-laws one last time. During the visit, he has a conversation with Helga's younger sister, Resi, that resonates with him for years afterward. After Campbell is captured by American forces, Wirtanen works out a deal in which he is set free and given passage to New York City.

Fifteen years later, Campbell lives an anonymous life, sustained only by memories of his wife and an indifferent curiosity about his eventual fate. His only friend is George Kraft, a likewise lonely neighbor—who, through an extraordinary coincidence, also happens to be a Soviet intelligence agent. He tries to trick Campbell into fleeing to Moscow by publicizing his identity and location. A white supremacist organization makes Campbell a cause célèbre, inviting him to speak to new recruits. The group's leader, a dentist named Lionel Jones, shows up at Campbell's apartment with a surprise: a woman claiming to be Helga, alive and well and professing her undying love. Campbell's will to live returns, and remains even after he finds out that she is not Helga, but rather Resi. They plan to escape to Mexico City after attending one of Jones' fascist meetings.

There, Wirtanen makes an appearance to warn Campbell of Kraft's plot and Resi's complicity. Heartbroken, Campbell decides to go along with the charade. He confronts Kraft and Resi, the latter swearing her feelings for him are genuine. The FBI then raids the meeting and takes Campbell into custody, while Resi commits suicide by taking a cyanide capsule. As before, Wirtanen uses his influence to have Campbell set free. Once Campbell returns to his apartment, however, he realizes that he has no real reason to continue living, and decides to turn himself in to the Israelis to stand trial.

While imprisoned in Israel, Campbell meets Adolf Eichmann and gives him advice on how to write an autobiography. At the very end of the book, he inserts a letter that he has just received from Wirtanen. The corroborating evidence that he was indeed an American spy has finally arrived, and Wirtanen writes that he will testify to Campbell's true loyalties in court. Rather than being relieved, Campbell feels disgusted by the idea that he will be saved from death and granted freedom only when he is no longer able to enjoy anything that life has to offer. In the last lines, Campbell tells the reader that he will hang himself not for crimes against humanity, but rather for "crimes against myself."

== Adaptations ==
A film adaptation was released in 1996, starring Nick Nolte as Campbell, Sheryl Lee as Helga/Resi, Alan Arkin as Kraft and John Goodman as Wirtanen. The film was written by Robert B. Weide.

In 2009, Audible.com produced an audio version of Mother Night, narrated by Victor Bevine, as part of its Modern Vanguard line of audiobooks.

A theatrical version, adapted and directed by Brian Katz, was premiered at the Custom Made Theater Company in San Francisco in 2017. A revival, also directed by Katz, was presented at 59E59 Theatres in New York in October 2018.
