= Mother Night (film) =

- Theatrical release poster
- Directed by: Keith Gordon
- Screenplay by: Robert B. Weide
- Based on: Mother Night by Kurt Vonnegut
- Produced by: Keith Gordon; Robert B. Weide; Mark Ordesky
- Starring: Nick Nolte; Sheryl Lee; Alan Arkin; Kirsten Dunst; Frankie Faison; John Goodman
- Cinematography: Tom Richmond
- Edited by: Jay Rabinowitz
- Music by: Michael Convertino
- Production company: Whyaduck Productions
- Distributed by: Fine Line Features
- Release dates: August 14, 1996 (Montreal); November 1, 1996
- Running time: 114 minutes
- Country: United States
- Languages: English; German; Yiddish
- Budget: $6 million
- Box office: $403,701

Mother Night is a 1996 American romantic war drama film produced and directed by Keith Gordon. It is based on Kurt Vonnegut's 1961 novel of the same name.

Nick Nolte stars as Howard W. Campbell, Jr., an American who moves with his family to Germany after World War I and goes on to become a successful German-language playwright. As World War II looms, Campbell meets a man who claims to be from the United States Department of War, and is recruited to spy for the U.S., transmitting Nazi propaganda containing hidden messages that can only be decoded by Allied intelligence. After the war, Campbell relocates to New York City, where he attempts to live in obscurity. Since the U.S. government keeps his true wartime role a closely guarded secret, Campbell is forced to live under an assumed identity. The film is narrated by Campbell, through a series of flashbacks, as he sits in a jail cell in Israel, writing his memoirs, and awaiting trial for war crimes.

The film also stars Sheryl Lee, John Goodman, Kirsten Dunst, Alan Arkin, and Frankie Faison. Vonnegut makes a brief appearance in a scene in New York City. Much of the film was made in Montréal.

== Plot ==
Confined in an Israeli jail, Howard W. Campbell, Jr. writes a memoir about his career in Nazi Germany. During the buildup to World War II, Campbell, an American playwright of German language stage productions, is approached by War Department operative Frank Wirtanen. Wirtanen asks Campbell to work as a spy for the U.S. in the approaching war, though he promises no reward or recognition. Campbell rejects the offer, but Wirtanen adds that he wants Campbell to take some time to consider, telling him that Campbell's answer will come in the form of how he acts and what positions he assumes once the war begins.

In the initial stages of the war, Campbell works his way up through Joseph Goebbels' Propaganda Ministry, eventually becoming the "voice" of English language broadcasts propagating Nazism and anti-Semitism at American citizens (a parallel to the real broadcaster, Dr. Edward Vieth Sittler). Unknown to the Nazis, all of the idiosyncrasies of his speech – deliberate pauses, coughing, etc. – form a secret code that covertly transmits information to Allied intelligence agencies. Late in the war, after his wife, Helga, is reportedly killed on the Eastern Front, Campbell visits her family in early 1945 outside Berlin, just before the Red Army arrives. Helga's younger sister, Resi, confesses that she is in love with him.

Eventually, Campbell is captured when an American infantryman recognizes his voice. Before he can be executed, Wirtanen arranges for Campbell's discreet release and helps his relocation to New York City. Campbell is shocked to learn that the American government will not reveal Campbell's true role in the war, because that would also reveal the spycraft techniques that America may continue to need for the next war. Although that means that Campbell is doomed to be a pariah, Wirtanen is unsympathetic, reasoning that Campbell would not have wanted the truth known had Germany won the war.

In New York City, Campbell lives a lonely existence for fifteen years, sustained only by memories of Helga and an indifferent curiosity about his eventual fate. Mrs. Epstein, a Holocaust survivor living in Campbell's building, is the only person who suspects his true identity; he seems to avoid her suspicions by feigning ignorance of German. Campbell's only friend is George Kraft, an elderly painter who, through an extraordinary coincidence, happens to be a Soviet intelligence agent.

Over many games of chess, Campbell reveals his secret past to Kraft, who tries to use this information to improve his standing with his handlers by forcing Campbell into a position where he must flee to Moscow. He leaks information about Campbell's whereabouts, which gets the attention of a neo-Nazi organization. Representatives of this group meet Campbell and present him with a woman who seems to be Helga. However, it is not long before Campbell discovers that Helga is actually Resi, who had taken Helga's identity to escape from East Germany.

The neo-Nazis shelter Campbell, along with Kraft and Resi, in their Manhattan hideout. Wirtanen reappears, warning Campbell of Kraft's true identity and explaining that Kraft and Resi have put Campbell in an awkward position with the neo-Nazis to ensure his transfer to Moscow. Campbell returns to the hideout to confront the pair; in light of her exposure, Resi commits suicide. Moments later, the FBI raids the hideout but, again, Wirtanen uses his influence to ensure Campbell walks free. Upon his release, he freezes in the middle of a footpath having lost all meaning to his life, until a police officer finally tells him to move along. Campbell returns to his wrecked apartment and decides to turn himself in to the Israelis to stand trial.

Campbell is taken to Haifa, where he is incarcerated in the cell below an unrepentant Adolf Eichmann. The film ends with the arrival of a letter from Wirtanen providing the corroborating evidence that Campbell was indeed a U.S. spy during the war. Moments later, Campbell hangs himself — not, he says, for crimes against humanity, but rather for "crimes against myself."

== Cast ==
- Nick Nolte as Howard W. Campbell, Jr.
  - Brawley Nolte as young Howard
- Sheryl Lee as Helga Noth/Resi Noth
  - Kirsten Dunst as young Resi
- Alan Arkin as George Kraft
- Arye Gross as Dr. Abraham Epstein
- Frankie Faison as Robert Sterling Wilson
- Bernard Behrens as Reverend Lionel Jones
- Gerard Parkes as Father Patrick Keeley
- Vlasta Vrána as August Krapptauer
- Zach Grenier as Joseph Goebbels
- Norman Rodway as Werner Noth
- John Goodman as Major Frank Wirtanen
- Bill Corday and Bronwen Mantel as Mr. and Mrs. Campbell
- David Strathairn as Lt. Bernard B. O'Hare
- Henry Gibson as Voice of Adolf Eichmann
- Kurt Vonnegut (cameo) as Sad man on street

== Reception ==
On Rotten Tomatoes the film has a 64% rating based on 28 reviews. Many reviewers commended Nick Nolte's performance, but criticized the ambiguity of the film's message. Roger Ebert wrote, "It is a tribute to Nolte's performance that while we are confused about the meaning of the story, we never doubt the presentation of his character." He acknowledged, that the ambiguity and the discordant tone are faithful to Vonnegut's novel. Gene Siskel of the Chicago Tribune observed that the confused message is exacerbated by the outsize emphasis placed on the propagandist speeches delivered by the main character.

Marjorie Baumgarten praised the film's ambition and other elements, but called the overall experience "disappointing": "Though disappointing, Mother Night is not without pleasures (high among these are the performances of Arkin, Goodman, and Henry Gibson as the voice of Adolph Eichmann, and the walk-on cameo of Vonnegut himself in a street scene); it just never finds a comfortable stride."
