= Gunter d'Alquen =

German propagandist and SS officer (1910–1998)

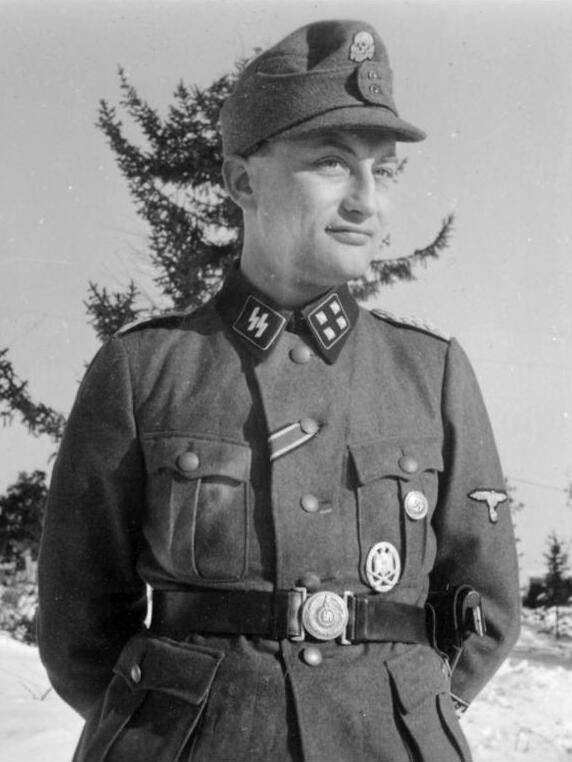
- d'Alquen c. 1941-1943
- Born: 24 October 1910; Essen, Rhine Province, Kingdom of Prussia, German Empire
- Died: 15 May 1998 (aged 87); Mönchengladbach, North Rhine-Westphalia, Germany
- Occupations: Journalist; propagandist; author
- Political party: Nazi Party
- Military career
- Allegiance: Nazi Germany
- Branch: Sturmabteilung; Waffen-SS
- Service years: 1927 – 1945
- Rank: Standartenführer
- Units: SS-Standarte Kurt Eggers
- Conflicts: World War II

Gunter d'Alquen (24 October 1910 – 15 May 1998) was chief editor of the weekly Das Schwarze Korps ("The Black Corps"), the official newspaper of the Schutzstaffel (SS), and commander of the SS-Standarte Kurt Eggers.

== Early life ==
Gunter d'Alquen was born to a Catholic-Freemason wool merchant and reserve officer named Carl d'Alquen of Spanish and Flemish descent, born in Essen on 24 October 1910. He attended grammar school in Essen and joined the Hitler Youth in 1925. In 1927, d'Alquen became a member of the SA and as a 16-year-old joined the NSDAP.

D'Alquen was active in the National Socialist German Student Union. He became a member of the SS on 10 April 1931. He did not complete his studies in history and philology and instead turned to a journalistic career. From 1932, he was a political correspondent to the editorial board of the Völkischer Beobachter ("Völkisch Observer"). It was here he aroused the attention of Heinrich Himmler, who appointed him chief editor of Das Schwarze Korps in March 1935.

== As chief editor ==
D'Alquen's newspaper often attacked intellectuals, students, Freemasons, certain scientists, rebellious businessmen, traffickers, clerics and other representatives of German society that had aroused Himmler's anger. With its notorious anti-Semitism, Das Schwarze Korps established itself as a moral spokesperson of Nazi beliefs.

From September 1939, d'Alquen became a prominent SS war correspondent. He was appointed head of the propaganda formation SS-Standarte Kurt Eggers named after Kurt Eggers, a friend of d'Alquen, an SS war correspondent and editor of Das Schwarze Korps who was killed in action in 1943.

== As a prisoner of war ==
In May 1945, d'Alquen was taken as a prisoner of war by the British Army. He was held at Camp 18, a prisoner-of-war camp on the grounds of Featherstone Castle in Northumberland, England. D'Alquen was released from custody in 1948.

== Later life ==
After the war, d'Alquen denied any knowledge of Nazi extermination camps. He was sentenced to 10 years in prison.

According to de-classified Central Intelligence Agency documents, as part of Operation Paperclip; d'Alquen was employed by the Counterintelligence Corps and was widely believed to have later been on a CIA payroll during the Cold War.

In July 1955, d'Alquen was sentenced by a Berlin Denazification court to pay a fine of 60,000 DM, followed by a loss of pension rights for three years. He was then found guilty of having played a significant role in wartime propaganda and incitement against churches, Jews, and foreigners in the Nazi state. After further investigation of d'Alquen's income from this activity, he was sentenced to pay another fine of 28,000 DM in January 1958.

According to British intelligence, he was a member of the Naumann Circle, headed by former State Secretary Werner Naumann, which attempted to infiltrate the Free Democratic Party. In the late 1950s, d'Alquen became a shareholder of a weaving mill in Mönchengladbach.

He died on 15 May 1998 in Mönchengladbach.

== Dates of rank ==
- SS-Anwärter - 10 April 1931
- SS-Mann - 10 April 1931
- SS-Sturmführer - 1 October 1932
- SS-Obersturmführer - 9 November 1933
- SS-Hauptsturmführer - 1 June 1934
- SS-Sturmbannführer - 30 January 1935
- SS-Obersturmbannführer - 16 October 1935
- SS-Standartenführer - 1 January 1937
- SS-Untersturmführer der Reserve - 1 March 1940
- SS-Obersturmbannführer der Reserve - 30 April 1940
- SS-Hauptsturmführer der Reserve - 1 August 1940
- SS-Sturmbannführer der Reserve - 9 November 1941
- SS-Obersturmbannführer der Reserve - 10 August 1943
- SS-Standartenführer der Reserve - 1943

== Awards ==
- Iron Cross, 2nd class
- War Merit Cross, 2nd class
- General Assault Badge
- Golden Party Badge of the NSDAP
- SS-Ehrenring and SS-Ehrendegen

== See also ==
- Das Schwarze Korps
- SS-Standarte Kurt Eggers
- Kurt Eggers
- List of Nazi Party leaders and officials
