= Sacred Heart Cemetery =

Roman Catholic cemetery in Florissant, St. Louis County, Missouri

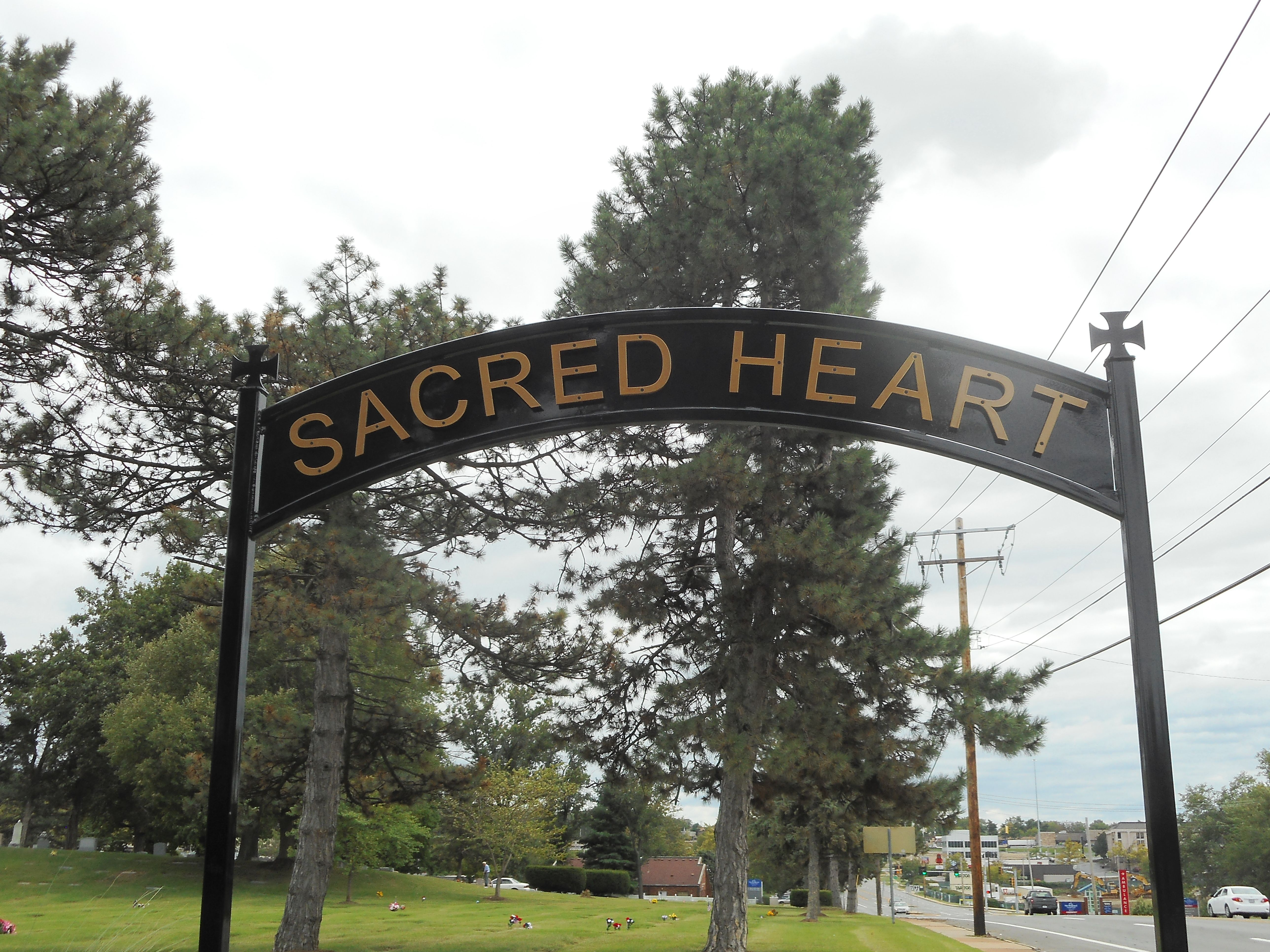
- The gate of Sacred Heart Cemetery

Details
- Established: 1874
- Location: 980 Graham Road; Florissant, Missouri
- Country: United States
- Coordinates: 38°46′54″N 90°20′01″W
- Type: Catholic
- Owned by: Roman Catholic Archdiocese of St. Louis
- No. of graves: >11,500
- Website: Official website
- Find a Grave: Sacred Heart Cemetery

Sacred Heart Cemetery is a Catholic Cemetery located in the Florissant suburb of St. Louis, Missouri.

== History ==
Sacred Heart Cemetery is owned by the Archdiocese of St. Louis. It was consecrated in 1874 after the local German settlers of Sacred Heart Catholic Church requested a plot of land to build a new cemetery. Their request was satisfied and the cemetery was constructed and initially given the name of the "German Catholic Cemetery", however it was eventually named Sacred Heart Cemetery in honor of the Sacred Heart of Jesus.

== Notable interments ==
- Martin James Monti – U.S. Army Air Corps pilot who defected to Nazi Germany in World War II.
- Tina Isa – Teenager killed by her parents in an honor killing.
