= Guarding the Secrets =

1995 non-fiction book by Ellen Harris

Guarding the Secrets: Palestinian Terrorism and a Father's Murder of His Too-American Daughter
- Author: Ellen Harris
- Language: English
- Subject: Murder of Palestina Isa
- Genre: Non-fiction
- Publication date: 1995
- Publication place: United States

Guarding the Secrets: Palestinian Terrorism and a Father's Murder of His Too-American Daughter is a 1995 non-fiction book about the murder of Palestina Isa in 1989 in St. Louis, Missouri, written by Ellen Harris.

== Background ==
Harris, who was born to a family with a history in St. Louis, attended Clayton High School as part of the class of 1964. Subsequently, she attended George Washington University's art program and she then entered Washington University in St. Louis and studied art Art History. She previously worked as a reporter for television networks. At the time of publication Harris resided in Clayton, Missouri.

She used law enforcement agencies, lawyers, judges, and video recordings of the perpetrator of the murder, Zein Isa, and his assistants as sources. Harris had developed relationships with law enforcement figures, which she says helped her write books about crime.

== Contents ==
According to her research, she found that the way Palestinian culture treasures the family as the ultimate authority especially interpreting their attitudes towards women from Islam, contributed to the murder.

== Reception ==
Kirkus Reviews concluded that "At its heart, and where it succeeds, the tragic story of a talented, vivacious young girl who desperately wanted to be a normal American teenager." It argued that "descriptions of terrorist intrigue are muddled, and she is far too worshipful of [the legal and law-related sources]."

Daniel Pipes wrote in the Middle East Quarterly, a publication of the think tank Middle East Forum, that he encountered some difficulty in comprehension of the flow of events as "Harris spent more effort digging up information than she did writing the book" but that it is "a treasure trove of materials on two usually elusive subjects."
