= Walter Sittler =

German-American actor

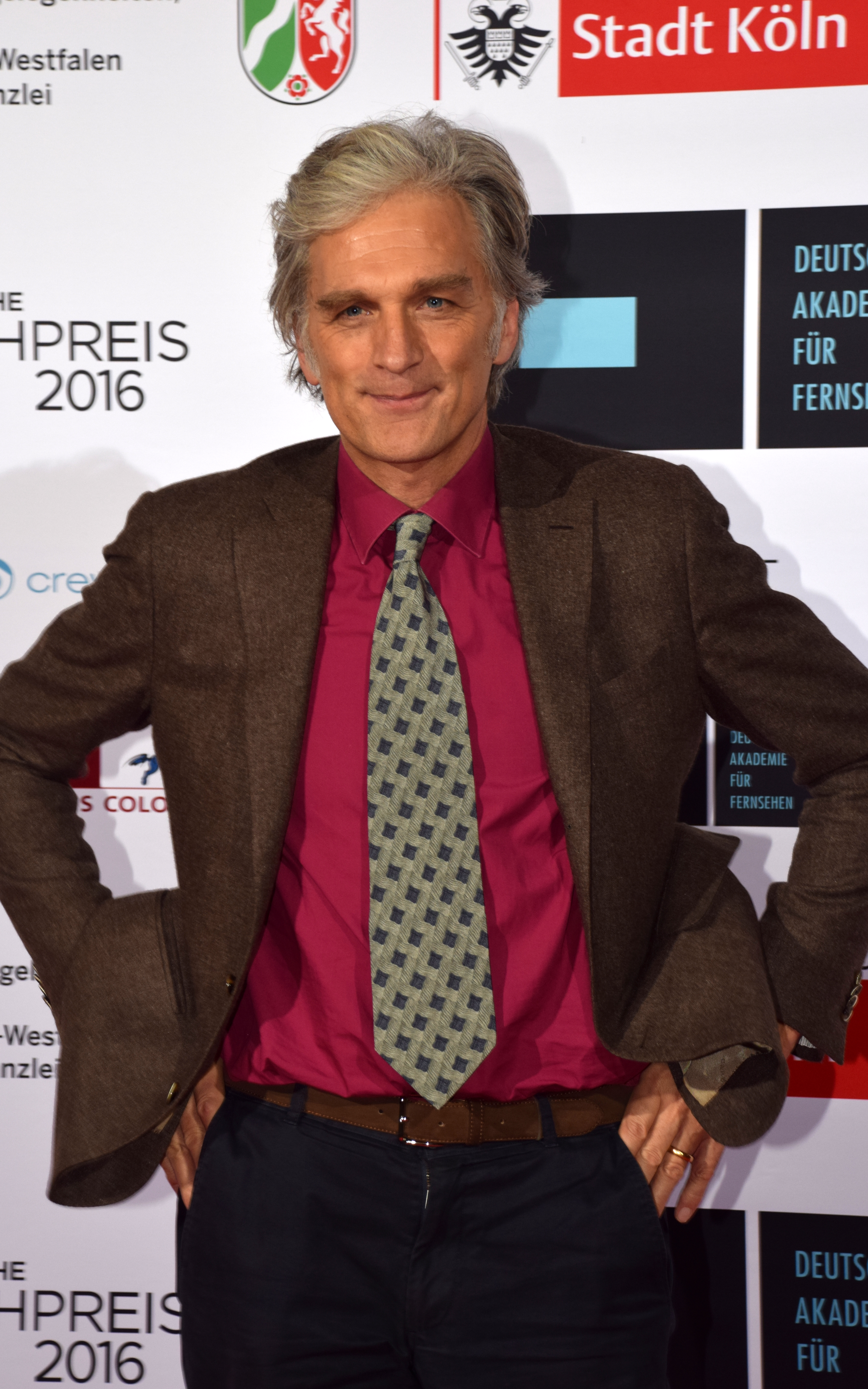
- Sittler in 2015
- Born: December 5, 1952 (age 73); Chicago, Illinois, U.S.
- Occupations: Actor; producer; writer
- Spouse: Sigrid Klausmann (m. 1985)
- Children: 3
- Relatives: Edward Vieth Sittler (father)

Walter Sittler is an American-German actor, producer, and writer.

== Early life ==
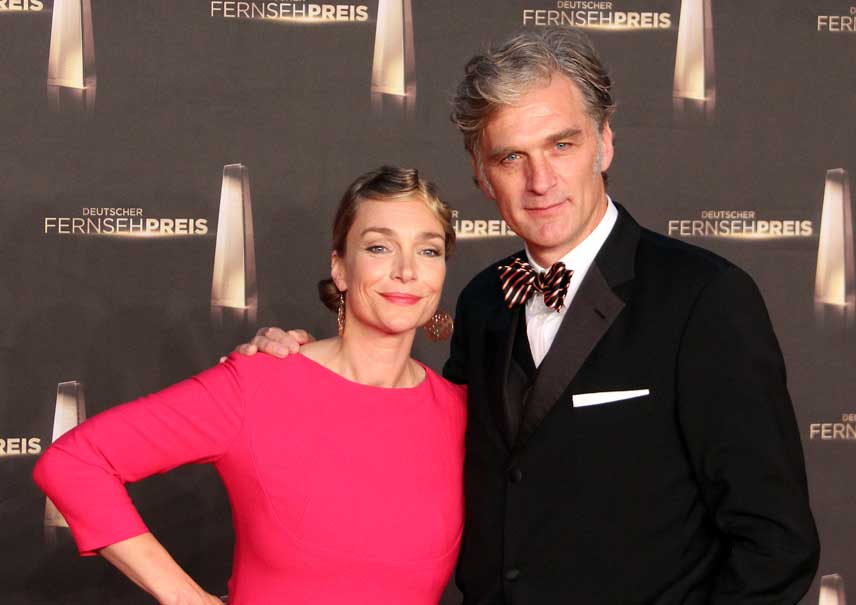
Deutscher Fernsehpreis 2012 – Aglaia Szyszkowitz and Walter Sittler at the Deutscher Fernsehpreis 2012

Sittler was born on December 5, 1952, in Chicago, Illinois. His father Edward Vieth Sittler had been born a United States citizen, but shortly after Germany's September 1, 1939, invasion of Poland had applied for naturalisation as a German citizen, renouncing his United States Citizenship, and had worked for the Reich Ministry of Public Enlightenment and Propaganda, including as an English language commentator broadcasting propaganda intended to weaken the morale of allied personnel during the Second World War. His father had an unsuccessful marriage in the United States before emigrating to Germany, and on September 27, 1940, had remarried to Walter Sittler's mother, Lily Margaret, who had been born in England in 1918 and held British and German citizenship. Sittler's paternal uncle, Charles Vieth Sittler, employed by the University of Chicago in 1960, had also broadcast for the Nazis (and had married Klara Julie Karoline Clee Hitterling in Berlin-Steglitz on February 1, 1945).

Although he had not renounced his United States citizenship Charles Vieth Sittler was neither charged with treason nor stripped of his citizenship. Edward Vieth Sittler and Charles Vieth Sittler had been returned separately to the United States by the United States Government after the Second World War as witnesses for the prosecution in the treason trials of other Americans who had worked for the Nazi German government. Edward Vieth Sittler, employed as a university professor, remained in the United States despite his lack of citizenship until deported in 1954. Walter Sittler possesses United States Citizenship on the basis of his own birth in the United States before the deportation. His father later returned to the US (it is unclear whether accompanied by his family or not) and attempted to regain his United States Citizenship, which was rejected by the Courts on April 12, 1963, following which he returned to West Germany, where he died in 1975.

== Professional life ==
Walter Sittler was an acting student at the Otto-Falckenberg-Schule in Munich, and debuted on the stage in 1981 at the Nationaltheater Mannheim. He went on to act also on television, including playing Dr. Robert Schmidt in the German television show Nikola (1997–2005), and in films such as EuroTrip (2004).

== Activism ==
Sittler has spoken out against the Stuttgart 21 railway and urban development project, and against populist politics, saying in a 2016 interview:

Wir befinden uns ja derzeit in einer nicht ungefährlichen Situation. Die AfD und Pegida erleben einen Aufschwung – Fakten scheinen denen im politischen und gesellschaftlichen Diskurs egal zu sein. Und trotzdem verfängt das leider bei ein paar Menschen. Wenn wir weiterhin eine freie Gesellschaft haben wollen, müssen die Leute endlich aufstehen und sich dafür engagieren. Populismus bringt uns nicht weiter (The AfD and Pegida are experiencing an upswing – facts seem to be irrelevant to those in political and social discourse. And yet, unfortunately, it gets caught in a few people. If we want to continue to have a free society, people must finally stand up and get involved. Populism doesn't get us any further).

In the 2016 United States presidential election he voted for Hillary Clinton against Donald Trump (another American-born television personality of German and British ancestry).

== Family ==
Sittler married to director and writer Sigrid Klausmann on May 29, 1985. They have three children, including actress Jennifer Sittler, Benedikt Sittler, and Lea-Marie Sittler.

== Filmography ==
=== Actor ===
- 1987: Die Schwarzwaldklinik (television series, 2 episodes)
- 1989: Tatort – Die Neue (television series)
- 1993–1994: Stadtklinik (television series, 2 episodes)
- 1990: Liebesgeschichten (television series, 1 episode)
- 1995–2004: Girl friends – Freundschaft mit Herz (television series, 69 episodes)
- 1995: Rosemarie Nitribitt – Tod einer Edelhure
- 1996: Mutproben
- 1996–2005: Nikola (television series, 9 episodes)
- 1997: Life Penalty
- 1998: Das Amt (television series)
- 1998: SOKO 5113 (television series)
- 1999: Rivalinnen der Liebe
- 2000: The Desert Rose (two-part television film)
- 2000: Das Herz des Priesters
- 2001: Der Millionär und die Stripperin
- 2002: The Gathering Storm (television film)
- 2002: Der Templer (short film)
- 2003: Für immer verloren
- 2004: Der Mustervater – Allein unter Kindern
- 2004: Eurotrip
- 2004: Die unlösbaren Fälle des Herrn Sand
- 2004–2007: Ein Fall für den Fuchs (television series, 6 episodes)
- 2005: Adelheid und ihre Mörder (television series)
- 2005: Ein Geschenk des Himmels
- 2006: My Husband's Getting Married Today
- 2007: Reife Leistung
- 2006: Trau niemals deinem Schwiegersohn
- 2007: Der Mustervater 2
- 2007: Der Butler und die Prinzessin
- seit 2007: Der Kommissar und das Meer (television series)
- 2009: Das Traumschiff (television series)
- 2010: Scheidung für Fortgeschrittene
- 2010: Kommissar Stolberg (television series)
- 2010: Weihnachten im Morgenland
- 2011: Halbe Portionen
- 2011: Almanya – Willkommen in Deutschland
- 2012: Die Jagd nach dem weißen Gold
- 2012: Polizeiruf 110: Fieber
- 2013: Der Minister
- 2013: Der große Schwindel
- 2014: Sternstunde ihres Lebens
- 2014: Zu mir oder zu dir?
- 2015: 600 PS für zwei (television film)
- 2015: Alleine war gestern
- 2015: Das goldene Ufer
- 2015: Starfighter
- 2015: Windstorm 2 (sequel to Windstorm)
- 2016: Viktor (Short film)
- 2017: Eltern allein zu Haus (television trilogy)
- 2018: Venus im vierten Haus
- 2018–2019: Daheim in den Bergen (television series)
  - 2018: Liebesleid
  - 2018: Schwesternliebe
  - 2019: Liebesreigen
  - 2019: Schuld und Vergebung
- 2020: Der Liebhaber meiner Frau
- 2020: Merkel: Anatomy of a Crisis
- 2020: Unter Freunden stirbt man nicht (television series, 4 episodes)
- 2021: Ein Sommer in Antwerpen (television series)

=== Producer ===
- 2007: Fliegen wirst du noch! (Documentary)
- 2009: Lisette und ihre Kinder (Documentary)
- 2010: Thomas Hitzlsperger und die Township Kinder (Documentary)
- 2017: Nicht ohne uns! (Documentary)

=== Voice ===
- 2010: Thomas Hitzlsperger and the Township Kinder (Documentary)
