= SS-Standarte Kurt Eggers =

SS propaganda unit

The SS-Standarte "Kurt Eggers" was an SS propaganda formation (SS-Standarte) of Nazi Germany during World War II. It publicised the actions of Waffen-SS combat units. The "Berichter" (literally: reporters) of the Standarte were fully trained and equipped for combat and expected to fight actively, if the situation demanded it.

== Operational history ==
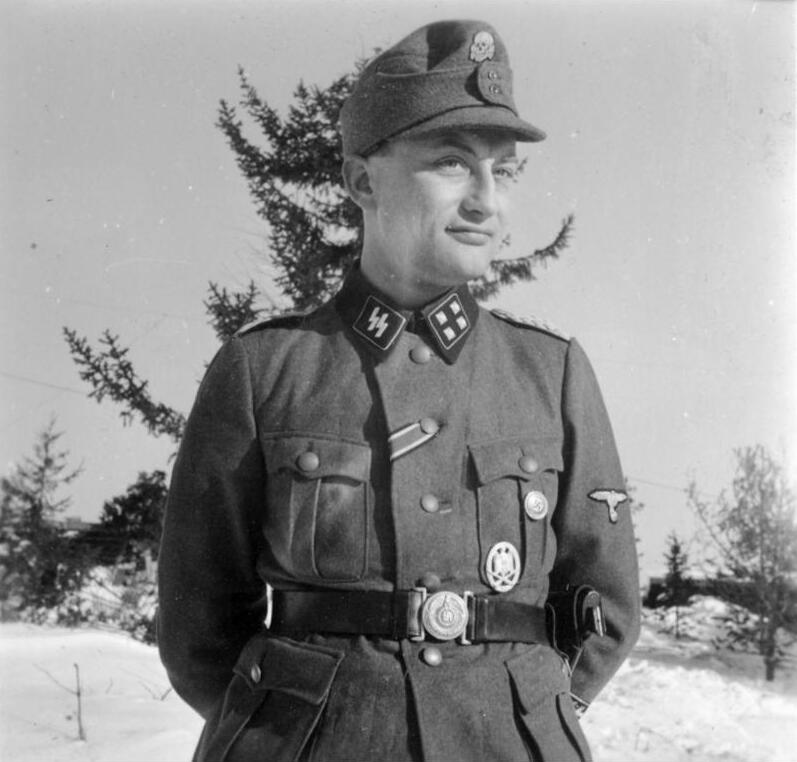
Gunter d'Alquen (1941), friend of the deceased Kurt Eggers and the leader of the SS-Standarte "Kurt Eggers"

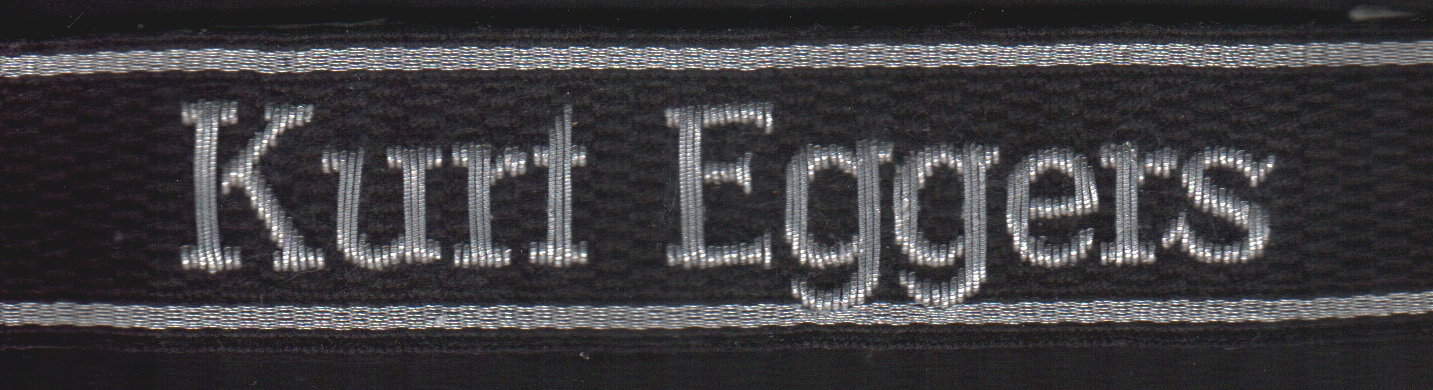
The armband of the SS-Standarte "Kurt Eggers"

The SS-Kriegsberichter-Kompanie ("SS War Reporter Company") was formed in January 1940 with four platoons of war correspondents and their support staff. The platoons were able to operate independently of each other, each equipped with still and movie cameras to enable units to visually document the actions of Waffen-SS men in combat.

The company came under the command of ex-Allgemeine-SS commander Günter d'Alquen who commanded the unit throughout its existence. One platoon was attached to each of the four Waffen-SS combat formations. These platoons were attached to their respective formations throughout the campaigns during the Battle of France and the invasion of Yugoslavia. By August 1941, the number of Waffen-SS formations had increased, and so the SS-Kriegsberichter-Kompanie increased in size as well, becoming the SS-Kriegsberichter-Abteilung (battalion).

As the number of SS combat-formations increased, so did the number of correspondents required. In December 1943, the unit reached regimental size and received the name SS-Standarte "Kurt Eggers". The honorary title referred to Kurt Eggers, SS war correspondent and editor of the SS magazine Das Schwarze Korps, who had been killed earlier in the year while reporting on the SS Division Wiking during the Third Battle of Kharkov.

A number of foreign Waffen-SS volunteers became Kurt Eggers photographers, movie cameramen, writers, broadcasters and recorders, and most were multilingual. Several formations within the Standarte were formed to gather information for occupied or allied countries, and these sub-units were generally staffed by volunteers of the relevant nationality. At least one American, Martin James Monti, several Britons, and a New Zealander served with the Standarte in the course of World War II. "Three English volunteers are known to have served in this unit, Railton Freeman (aka Royston and Metcalfe), who was sentenced to ten years' imprisonment after the War, Dennis John Leister (aka Beckwith) and Francis Paul Maton (aka Wood) as well as one from New Zealand: Roy Nicholias Courlander (aka Regan). After the war, Leister, Matton, and Courlander were all court-martialled for aiding the enemy. Leister was sentenced to three years in prison, Matton to 10 years in prison, and Courlander to 15 years in prison, which was reduced to nine years on appeal. Monti was court-martialed for stealing a plane in order to defect, but before being charged with treason in a civilian court. He pleaded guilty and was sentenced to 25 years in prison.
