= Edward Vieth Sittler =

Nazi propagandist (1916–1975)

Edward Vieth Sittler (1916–1975) was an American musician and educator who renounced his United States citizenship before World War II in order to take German citizenship, and (similarly to the fictional Howard W. Campbell Jr. in the Kurt Vonnegut 1962 novel Mother Night and its film adaptation) worked for the Nazis as a broadcaster during World War II.

== Early life ==
Sittler was born in Illinois (though some records give his birthplace as Delaware, Ohio), in 1916, a child of The Reverend Doctor Joseph Andrew Sittler (1876–1961) and Minnie Lillian Vieth Sittler (1874–1963). Both of his parents were born in the United States, though his paternal grandmother, Eva Großhans Sittler, and his paternal grandfather's father were Alsatian, and his maternal grandfather was German. His siblings included William Walter Sittler, Joseph Andrew Sittler Jr., Louis Vieth Sittler, Loring Vieth Sittler, and Charles Vieth Sittler, and sisters Mary Josephine Sittler and Margaret L. Sittler. The family had moved to Ohio after Sittler's birth. His father, a United Lutheran Church minister, was to become head of the Lutheran synod of Ohio in 1939, and Professor of Theology on the Federated Theological Faculty at the University of Chicago in the 1950s.

== Second World War in Germany ==
Sittler studied for three years at Ohio State University and Bard College before travelling to Germany in 1937 to learn the German language before studying at a German university. Shortly after Germany's September 1, 1939, invasion of Poland, Sittler applied for naturalisation as a German citizen, renouncing United States Citizenship. Following his naturalisation in 1940, he worked for the Reich Ministry of Public Enlightenment and Propaganda, including as an English-language commentator broadcasting propaganda intended to weaken the morale of allied personnel between 1943 and 1945.

Sittler had also joined the Nazi Party in 1942. In November 1944, Sittler was sent to interview American defector Martin James Monti. After Sittler deemed him suspect, Monti was sent to a prisoner-of-war camp. Monti was later released from the prison camp after convincing the Germans of his sincerity. Monti (who used the name Martin Weithaupt in Germany), who was also employed in the production of propaganda, became a regular visitor to Sittler's home. Both would later join SS-Standarte Kurt Eggers. Monti was commissioned but Sittler was enlisted as a Private. Ordered to Kampfsender Viktoria in the Italian Alps in April 1945, the two parted company when Monti was able to board a crowded train in Berlin due to his officer's uniform while Sittler was forced to wait for a later train. Sittler would be interrogated by American investigator Anthony Cuomo, and asked Cuomo whether he knew a P-38 pilot named Martin Weithaupt. Cuomo had in fact interrogated Monti, who had been captured in Italy where his explanation (that he had stolen his SS uniform and was escaping the German-occupied area with the help of the Italian resistance) was doubted, but had avoided prosecution due to the influence of his father. On May 22, 1946, Special Attorney Clyde E. Gooch in Frankfurt, Germany, wrote to Assistant Attorney General Theron L. Caudle in Washington, D.C., calling for Monti's prosecution.

== Post-war in the United States ==
Sittler was permitted to return to the United States in 1946, arriving at New York City on October 25 on Flight NC9093 from Germany (his last address in Germany was Prinz-Heinrich-Straße 17, Berlin, though he boarded the flight in Frankfurt) with an exit permit (number 071629) issued by the United States Army Military Orders Headquarters in Frankfurt. His entry document indicates his destination was the Department of Justice in Washington, D.C., that the purpose of his entry was Government business, and that his intended length of stay was two months. He was a witness in the 1947 trial of Douglas Chandler and the 1948 trial of Robert Henry Best (the latter trial was delayed by Sittler contracting mumps). Monti, who also knew Chandler and Best, refused to testify against them. He had been summoned on November 18 to the Department of Justice where he was identified as Martin Weithaupt by Sittler, his wife (who had arrived in the United States on a military flight on November 16, 1946), and former Nazi propagandist colleagues Margaret Eggers, Loretta Grunau Kapke, and seven others brought to the United States as witnesses against Chandler and Best. There would be a lengthy delay before Monti, who was permitted to re-enlist into the United States Army, would be charged.

Despite no longer possessing United States citizenship, Sittler remained in the United States teaching German at Northwestern. On November 3, 1949, Representative Charles E. Bennett asked for Sittler to be deported. Sittler accused Bennett of misrepresenting facts of his time in Germany. Sittler had by then lost his position at Northwestern, and had been hired in September 1949, as an Assistant Professor of German at the Michigan College of Mining and Technology in Houghton, Michigan, but was dismissed in November 1949, when his Nazi background was revealed. The government ordered him deported on December 2, 1949, but he was granted a Court hearing at which former colleagues from Northwestern testified against him. Sittler claimed that his life could be in danger if deported to Germany and requested restoration of his US citizenship. He also requested citizenship for his wife and their six children (their son, future actor Walter Sittler (actor) would be born a US Citizen in Chicago on December 5, 1952). On June 5, 1951, Sittler was ordered to leave the United States within ninety days or face deportation to West Germany. He was reportedly actually deported to Cuba in 1954 (some sources record that he returned to the United States via Cuba in 1954).

Sittler returned to the United States in 1954 (evidently leaving his wife and eight children in Germany), joined the faculty of Long Island University in New York State, and applied for his United States citizenship to be restored. When Sittler's presence became more widely known, calls for his removal from Long Island University and the United States multiplied, led by the New York Department of the Jewish War Veterans, Senator Jacob Javits, State Assemblyman Alfred D. Lerner, and the former commanders of five Long Island veterans' associations. Admiral Richard L. Conolly, US Navy (retired), the President of Long Island University, said that the charges against Sittler were made by innuendo and anonymously, and that he would not be moved to act against Sittler by people who were "intent on persecution". As protests increased, however, Sittler resigned from Long Island University on December 16, 1959. The following day his citizenship application was refused. Representative Steven Derounian was accused in 1960 by two former United States Army intelligence officers of coddling Sittler while Sittler had been held in a prisoner-of-war camp under then-Captain Derounian's command.

Sittler took his case for citizenship before the court, which rejected it on April 12, 1963, when Federal Judge Lloyd F. MacMahon said:

"in this troubled world, it is sought by many, granted to few, and treasured by all who possess it. The gift is not to be conferred lightly, and certainly not to those as untrustworthy as this petitioner".

Sittler returned to West Germany, where he died in 1975. His brother Charles Vieth Sittler, employed by the University of Chicago in 1960, had also broadcast for the Nazis (and had married Klara Julie Karoline Clee Hitterling in Berlin-Steglitz on February 1, 1945), and had arrived in the United States at Westover Field on January 18, 1949, on a military flight via the Azores with Egidius A. Houben, both as Government witnesses destined for the United States Attorney's office in the Federal Building at Brooklyn, New York City. Charles Vieth Sittler, however, was neither charged with treason nor stripped of his US Citizenship.

== Family ==
Sittler had an unsuccessful marriage in the United States before emigrating to Germany. On September 27, 1940, he re-married to Lily Margaret Overweg, who had been born in Lewisham, England, in 1917 and held British and German citizenship, and the two had at least eight children, including daughters Minnie Christine Sittler (born 1942) and Andrea Cossina Sittler (born 1945), and sons Carl Edward (born 1941), Wolff Sittler (born 1943), and Walter Sittler (born 1952).
