= Kurt Eggers =

Nazi writer, poet, and soldier (1905–1943)

- Born: 10 November 1905; Berlin, Brandenburg, German Empire
- Died: 12 August 1943 (aged 37); Russian SFSR, Soviet Union
- Occupations: Writer; poet; songwriter; playwright
- Spouse: Traute Kaiser
- Children: 4
- Writing career
- Genres: Plays, radio drama, musical comedies, folk stories, walking songs, martial songs, and chants
- Movement: Nazism
- Military career
- Allegiance: Weimar Republic; Nazi Germany
- Branch: (Nazi Germany) Wehrmacht Propaganda Troops; Waffen-SS
- Service years: (Weimar Republic) 1921–1933; (Waffen-SS) 1933–1943
- Rank: Untersturmführer
- Unit: SS Division Wiking
- Conflicts: World War II

Kurt Eggers (10 November 1905 – 12 August 1943) was a German writer, poet, songwriter, and playwright with close links to the Nazi Party. He served as both a member of a propaganda company (Propagandakompanie) and as a Waffen-SS soldier at the rank of Mann in World War II, he was killed while serving in a tank regiment on the Eastern Front by the Red Army.

== Early life ==
Kurt Eggers was born in 1905 in Berlin, the son of a bank clerk. In 1917, he entered the Cadet Corps and began training on a school ship. In 1919, he participated in the suppression of the Spartacist uprising. In 1920, he joined the antisemitic Deutschvölkischer Schutz- und Trutzbund and participated in the Kapp Putsch, an attempt to overthrow the new Weimar Republic. In 1921, he joined the Freikorps and was involved in the battle for Annaberg hill during the Silesian Uprisings, where German Freikorps personnel fought against Polish nationalists.

== Post-World War I ==
After a spell in an artillery regiment, he resumed his education in 1924. He studied Sanskrit, archaeology, philosophy, and theology in Rostock, Berlin and Göttingen. He was particularly interested in the German Reformation and the revolutionary Ulrich von Hutten. He joined the Corps Vandalia Rostock, a student group, in 1927. After his theology exams, he became a pastor in Neustrelitz and then a curate in Berlin. However, he rapidly fell out of favor with church authorities with his "Song of the Struggling Peasants" calling for a violent revolt.

== Nazism and World War II ==
With the rise of Adolf Hitler, he received rapid promotion through the new regime, gaining a succession of party positions while he continued to work as a writer, producing plays, radio drama, musical comedies, folk stories, walking songs, martial songs, and chants. He joined the Nazi Party in May 1937 with membership number 3,953,817. His verses were widely used in party ceremonies and events.

Following the invasion of Poland, he headed for the front, joining the staff of a Panzer company, but he later returned to writing. He was the editor-in-chief of the Das Schwarze Korps (The Black Corps), the official newspaper of the SS. He was also a member of an SS propaganda company.

Around the middle of 1942, while working as a writer for the Party Chancellery, he expressed a desire to return to battle, and was transferred to the Panzer reserve. It was then that he joined the SS Division Wiking, which was made up partly of foreign volunteers, he took part in the unit's retreat from the Caucasus in the winter of 1942-43.

== Death ==
In late July 1943, he rejoined the SS Division Wiking in the aftermath of the Battle of Kursk, which was followed by a Soviet offensive. On 12 August 1943 he died southwest of Belgorod (in Western Russia near the border with Ukraine), while attempting to counterattack against the advancing Red Army troops. His death was marked by a memorial service on 26 September 1943 in the Kroll Opera House in Berlin. The SS War Reporters Section, a platoon of propaganda staffers attached to SS units, was renamed the SS-Standarte Kurt Eggers in November 1943 in his honor.

He had four children by his second wife, Traute Kaiser, whose father was a pastor.

== Literary works ==
- Von der Feindschaft, Deutsche Gedanken, 1941.
- Der Scheiterhaufen: Worte großer Ketzer, 1942.
- Vater aller Dinge, 1943.
- Vom mutigen Leben und tapferen Sterben.
- The Freedom of the Warrior, (English translation).
- Der Freiheit wildes Lied.
- Struggle and War, (English translation).
- Der Kaiser der Römer gegen den König der Juden
- Kamerad: Gedichte eines Soldaten
