= Joseph Sittler =

American theologian

Joseph Andrew Sittler (September 26, 1904 – December 28, 1987) was an American Lutheran minister and theologian who taught at Maywood Seminary, eventually merged into the Divinity School of the University of Chicago and the Lutheran School of Theology at Chicago. He was also active in the Christian ecumenical movement, working with World Council of Churches and the National Council of Churches.

== Biography ==
Joseph Sittler, the son of Lutheran pastor The Reverend Doctor Joseph Andrew Sittler Jr. (1876–1961) and Minnie Lillian Veith Sittler (1874–1963), was born in Upper Sandusky, Ohio. He was a graduate of Wittenberg College and Hamma Divinity School in Springfield, Ohio. Sittler became a teacher at Chicago Lutheran Theological Seminary in the early 1940s. He was a professor of theology at the University of Chicago from 1957 to 1973. He was widely credited with pioneering the links between Christian theology and ecological thought, including the need to return to a cosmic Christology, having written about environmental matters as early as the 1950s (long before they were widely reported in the mainstream press). He continually insisted that care for the earth and its environment is a central concern of the Christian religion. He was also interested in the topics of aging, grace, religion and science, narrative in preaching, and biblical interpretation. Sittler's siblings included Nazi propagandists Dr. Edward Vieth Sittler (1916–1975) and Charles Vieth Sittler (1914–1996).

== Personal life ==
Rev. Joseph Sittler died in 1987. His wife Jeanne died in 1991. They were survived by six children, Stephen, Joseph Jr, Edward, Barbara, Philip and Bay. Joseph Sittler was also an uncle of German actor Walter Sittler.

== Published works ==
Sittler was a prolific theologian. His books were, in many cases, derived from his speaking engagements.

- The Doctrine of the Word in the Structure of Lutheran Theology (1948), publication of the Knubel-Miller Foundation lectures, ULCA
- The Structure of Christian Ethics (1958), publication of the Rockwell Lectures on Religious Subjects, Rice Institute, Houston, TX (Reissued in the "Library of Christian Ethics" series by WJK Press, 1998)
- The Ecology of Faith (1961), publication of the Lyman Beecher lectures, Yale, 1959
- The Care of the Earth and Other University Sermons (1964) (Reissued by Fortress Press as The Care of the Earth in 2004)
- The Anguish of Preaching (1966), publication of the Dr. and Mrs. Jeremiah Zimmerman Lectureship at the Lutheran Theological Seminary at Gettysburg
- Essays on Nature and Grace (1972)
- Grace Notes and other Fragments (1981) Fortress Press
- Gravity and Grace: Reflections and Provocations (1986) (Expanded and reissued by Fortress Press, 2005)
- Running With the Hounds: Conversation with Campus Ministry, June, 1977 (2000) (republication of material found in the CSCM Yearbook 1977-78, Center for the Study of Campus Ministry, Valparaiso University, Valparaiso, IN)
- Evocations of Grace: The Writings of Joseph Sittler on Ecology, Theology, and Ethics (2000)

== Sittler Archives ==
The Joseph Sittler Archives are maintained at the Lutheran School of Theology at Chicago.
