= Landkreis Falkenberg O.S. =

District of Prussia

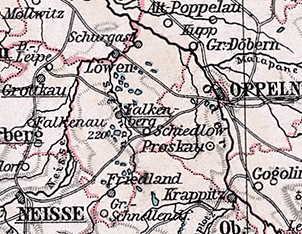
Falkenberg O.S. district (1905)

The Falkenberg O.S. district was a Prussian district in Upper Silesia, which existed from 1743 to 1945. Its capital was the town of Falkenberg O.S. The territory of this district is now located within the Opole Voivodeship of Poland.

== History ==
=== Kingdom of Prussia ===
After the conquest of most of Silesia, King Frederick the Great introduced Prussian administrative structures in Lower Silesia in 1742 and in Upper Silesia in 1743. This included the establishment of two war and domain chambers in Breslau and Glogau as well as their division into districts. The district of Falkenberg was initially under the War and Domain Chamber of Breslau. In the course of the Prussian Reform Movement, the administrative region of Oppeln was created in the Province of Silesia, which included the Falkenberg district.

During the district reform of January 1, 1818, the district boundaries were changed as follows:

- The villages of Budzieszowice, Bielitz, Groß Mahlendorf, Hermannshof, Kaltecke, Lamsdorf and Schaderwitz were transferred from the Neisse district to the Falkenberg district.
- The villages of Grüben and Sonnenberg were transferred from the Grottkau district to the Falkenberg district.
- The villages of Baumgarten, Ellguth-Friedland, Ellguth-Tillowitz, Floste, Groditz, Hammer, Jamke, Michelsdorf, Piechotzütz, Plieschnitz, Puschine, Sabine, Schedliske, Schiedlow, Seifersdorf, Sokollnik, Tillowitz, Weiderwitz and Woistrasch were transferred from the Oppeln district to the Falkenberg district.

=== German Reich ===
From 1871, the district belonged to the German Empire. On November 8, 1919, the province of Silesia was dissolved and the new province of Upper Silesia was formed from Regierungsbezirk Oppeln. In the spring of 1945, the district was occupied by the Red Army. After the war, the region became part of Poland under the terms of the Potsdam Agreement.

== Demographics ==
The district had a German majority population, with a significant Polish minority.

Population of the Falkenberg district
	1840		1861	
Germans	29,463	85.5%	34,797	88.9%
Poles	4,993	14.5%	4,355	11.1%
Total	34,456		39,152	

== Communities ==
The Falkenberg district comprised three towns and 75 rural communities in 1936.

- Arnsdorf
- Baumgarten
- Bauschwitz
- Bielitz
- Borkwitz
- Brande
- Dambrau
- Deutsch Jamke
- Ellguth-Hammer
- Ellguth-Tillowitz
- Falkenberg O.S., town
- Floste
- Friedland O.S., town
- Geppersdorf
- Golschwitz
- Graase
- Groditz
- Groß Mahlendorf
- Groß Mangersdorf
- Groß Sarne
- Groß Schnellendorf
- Grüben
- Guhrau
- Guschwitz
- Heidersdorf
- Hilbersdorf
- Hillersdorf
- Jakobsdorf
- Jamke
- Jatzdorf
- Julienthal
- Karbischau
- Kirchberg
- Klein Mangersdorf
- Klein Sarne
- Klein Schnellendorf
- Kleuschnitz
- Korpitz
- Lamsdorf
- Lippen
- Mauschwitz
- Michelsdorf
- Mullwitz
- Neuleipe
- Niewodnik
- Nikoline
- Norok
- Nüßdorf
- Petersdorf
- Piechotzütz
- Plieschnitz
- Puschine
- Ranisch
- Raschwitz
- Rauske
- Rautke
- Rogau
- Roßdorf
- Sabine
- Schaderwitz
- Schedlau
- Schedliske
- Scheppanowitz
- Scheppelwitz
- Schiedlow
- Schönwitz
- Schurgast, town
- Seifersdorf
- Sonnenberg
- Sorge
- Springsdorf
- Stroschwitz
- Tarnitze
- Tillowitz
- Weiderwitz
- Weißdorf
- Weschelle
- Wiersbel

== Place Names ==
In 1936/37 numerous parishes in the district were renamed:

- Bauschwitz → Bauschdorf
- Borkwitz → Borkenhain
- Deutsch Jamke → Mittenwalde
- Ellguth-Tillowitz → Steinaugrund
- Golschwitz → Eichenried
- Groditz → Burgstätte
- Guschwitz → Buchengrund
- Jamke → Heinrichshof
- Korpitz → Korndorf
- Mauschwitz → Mauschdorf
- Niewodnik → Fischbach
- Nikoline → Niklasfähre
- Norok → Wolfsgrund
- Piechotzütz → Pechwalde → Bauerngrund
- Plieschnitz → Fuchsberg
- Puschine → Erlenburg
- Raschwitz → Raschdorf → Rauschwalde
- Sabine → Annahof
- Schaderwitz → Schadeberg
- Schedliske → Waldsiedel
- Scheppanowitz → Stefansfeld
- Scheppelwitz → Steffansgrund
- Schiedlow → Goldmoor
- Stroschwitz → Straßendorf
- Tarnitze → Dornfeld
- Weiderwitz → Weidendorf
- Weschelle → Freudendorf
- Wiersbel → Weidengut
