= Opole–Nysa railway =

Railway line in Poland

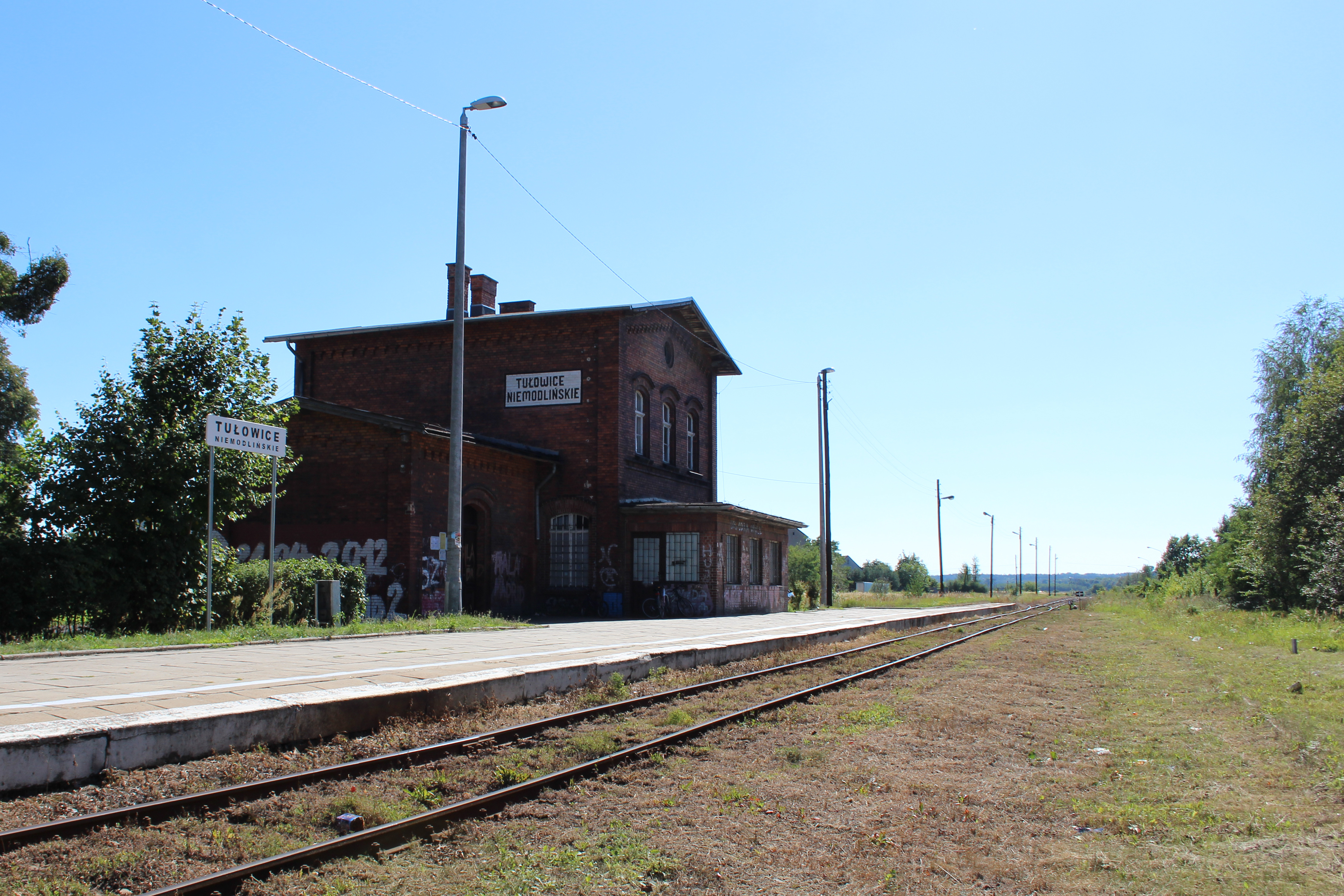
- Tułowice in 2012

Overview
- Other name: Opolanka
- Status: Operational
- Owner: PKP Polskie Linie Kolejowe
- Line number: PKP 287
- Locale: Poland
- Termini: Opole Zachodnie; Nysa
- Connecting lines: Bytom–Wrocław railway Sudeten Main Line; Nysa–Brzeg railway
- Former connections: Szydłów–Lipowa Śląska railway
- Stations: 17

Service
- Operator: Polregio
- Rolling stock: PKP class SA134; PKP class SA137; PKP class SA103

History
- Opened: 1 October 1887

Technical
- Line length: 48.7 km (30.3 mi)
- Number of tracks: Single-track
- Track gauge: 1,435 mm (4 ft 8 1/2 in) standard gauge
- Operating speed: 120 km/h (75 mph)

The Opole–Nysa railway, nicknamed Opolanka is a single-track, non-electrified branch line connecting Opole Zachodnie railway station in Opole and Nysa railway station in Nysa in the Opole Voivodeship of southern Poland. It is 48.7 km (30.3 mi) long.

The railway used to be numbered 113 according to D29 from 1949, the number changed to 249 in 1971, and changed to the current number 287 in 1985 where its current number is still being used today.

The railway opened on 1 October 1887, the traffic on the railway was reactivated in October 1946. On 28 March 2018, Polskie Linie Kolejowe signed a contract worth over 122 million PLN for the railway modernization under the Regional Operational Program of the Opole Voivodeship 2014–20, it was to improve passenger and freight traffic between Opole and Nysa. The modernization was completed in 2019.

== Route ==
The line starts at Opole Zachodnie railway station in Opole on the Bytom–Wrocław railway, it heads south west crossing five streets and passes Opole Chmielowice railway station (2.9 km of the line). The line heads to Komprachcice where it crosses Voivodeship road 429 and passes Komprachcice railway station (6.6 km of the line), the line is branched with the 91st Logistics Battalion facility and the Opole-Polska Nowa Wieś airport.

After Komprachcice, the line enters Tułowice forest eventually passing European route E40 below, next it enters Szydłów where it passes Szydłów Central railway station (14.5 km of the line) and stops at Szydłów railway station (15.4 km of the line), the line is connected with Szydłów–Lipowa Śląska railway and was branched with the brickworks in Szydłów. After Szydłów, it heads to Tułowice leaving the forest, crossing Voivodeship road 405 and passing Tułowice railway station (19.7 km of the line), the line was branched with the porcelain factory.

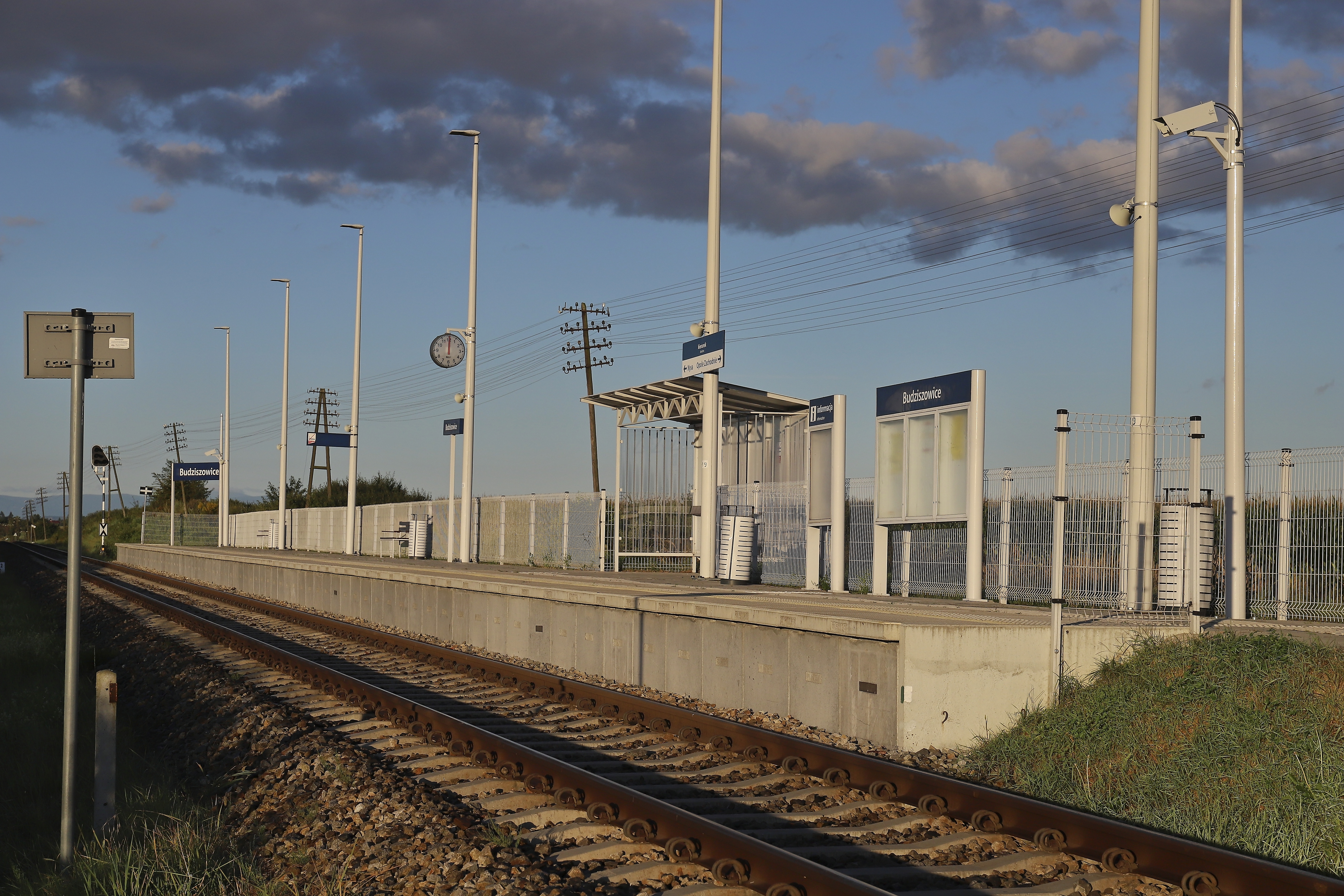
Budzieszowice in 2025

The line shifts south south west passing Goszczowice (23.1 km of the line) and Sowin (25.3 km of the line) railway stations, then heads to Łambinowice shifting south west and passes Łambinowice railway station (29.1 km of the line), the line was branched with the machine factory. The line continues heading south west passing Budzieszowice railway station (31.9 km of the line) and crossing Voivodeship road 406, it passes Jasienica Dolna (34.9 km of the line), Mańkowice (37.6 km of the line) and Kubice (40.6 km of the line) railway stations, where in Kubice the line crosses Voivodeship road 407. Near Wyszków Śląski the line passes National road 41 and Wyszków Śląski railway station (44.3 km of the line), next it enters Nysa where the line passes Nysa Wschodnia railway station (46.4 km of the line) and stops at Nysa railway station, ending the line.

The line used to have Polska Nowa Wieś railway station (9.8 km of the line), which was closed after 1952.
