= Jamka =

Jamka may refer to the following places :

- Jamka State, a former princely state, and the village it comprised, on Saurashtra peninsula, in Gujarat, western India
- Stara Jamka, a village in Opole Voivodeship, in south-western Poland
