= Mala Gora =

Mala Gora may refer to:

- Mała Góra, a hamlet in Poland
- Mala Gora, Croatia, a village near Pregrada
- Mala Gora, Kočevje, a settlement in the Municipality of Kočevje, Slovenia
- Mala Gora, Zreče, a settlement in the Municipality of Zreče, Slovenia
