= Reinhold Schlegelmilch =

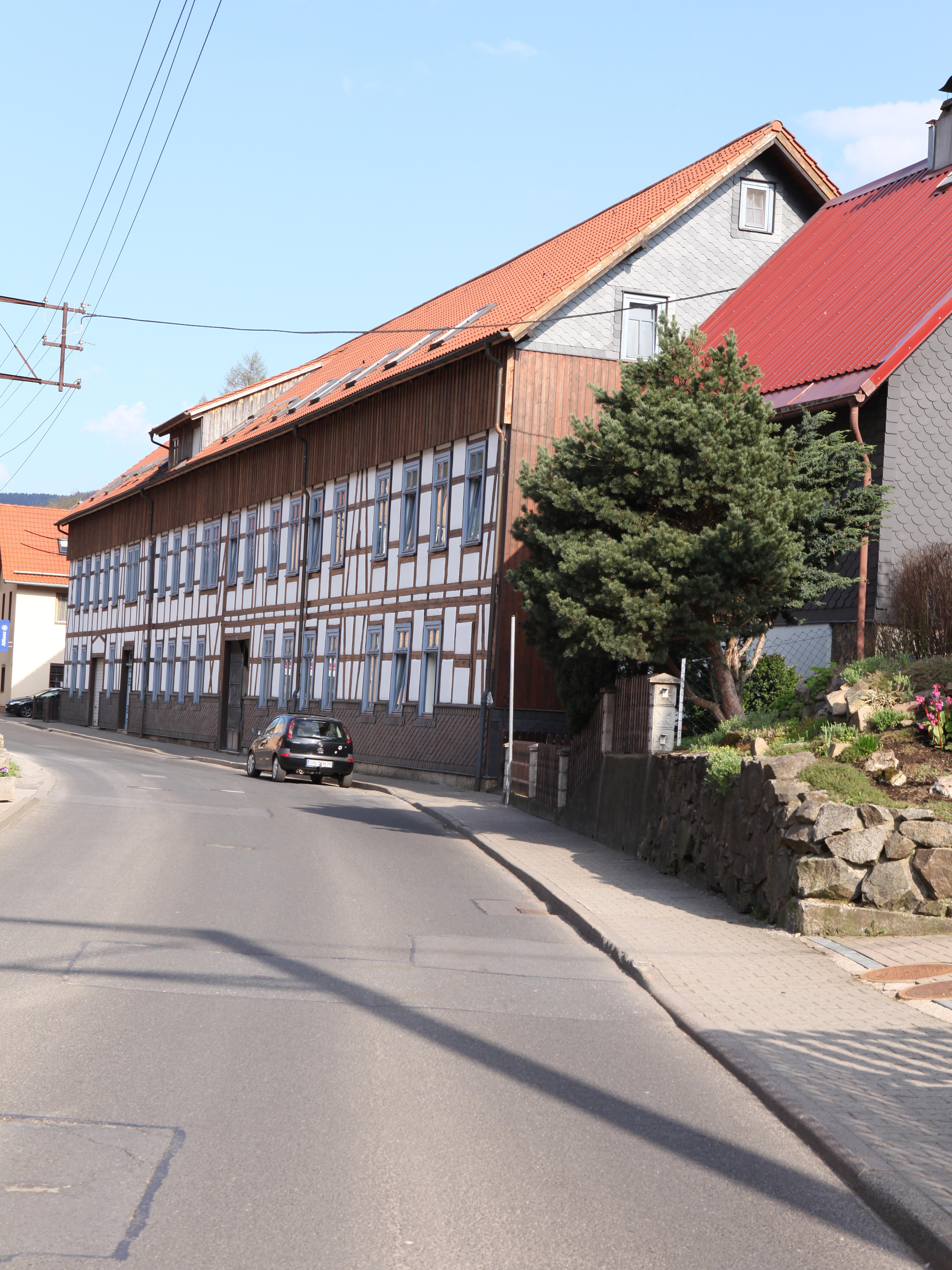
Former Reinhold Schlegelmilch porcelain factory in Lauter, Ot von Suhl

Reinhold Schlegelmilch was a porcelain manufacturer in Suhl, Germany, founded in the 19th century.

== Mark ==
The factory mark was the initials "RS" in red encircled by a green wreath beneath a red five-pointed star.

== Successors ==
Reinhold Schlegelmilch had two sons, Arnold Schlegelmilch and Ehrhard Schlegelmilch.

== Suhl ==
Ehrhard Schlegelmilch operated the factory in Suhl, and during this period, most of the pieces exported to the United States bore the "RS Prussia" mark stamped in red.

== Tillowitz ==
Arnold Schlegelmilch started a factory in Tillowitz, then Germany (now Tułowice), Poland. In 1910, the Tillowitz factory began using the "RS Germany" mark stamped in green. The Tillowitz factory kept producing porcelain through the Second World War. The company was taken over by the Polish state in 1946 and privatized in 1995 under the name Fabryka Porcelitu Tułowice SA. The production in 2011 concentrated on sanitary and building ceramics including tiles.

== Export ==
These two operations produced the majority of their products for export beginning in 1892 until the beginning of World War I.

== See also ==
- Pickard China
