= 2004–05 Polish Cup =

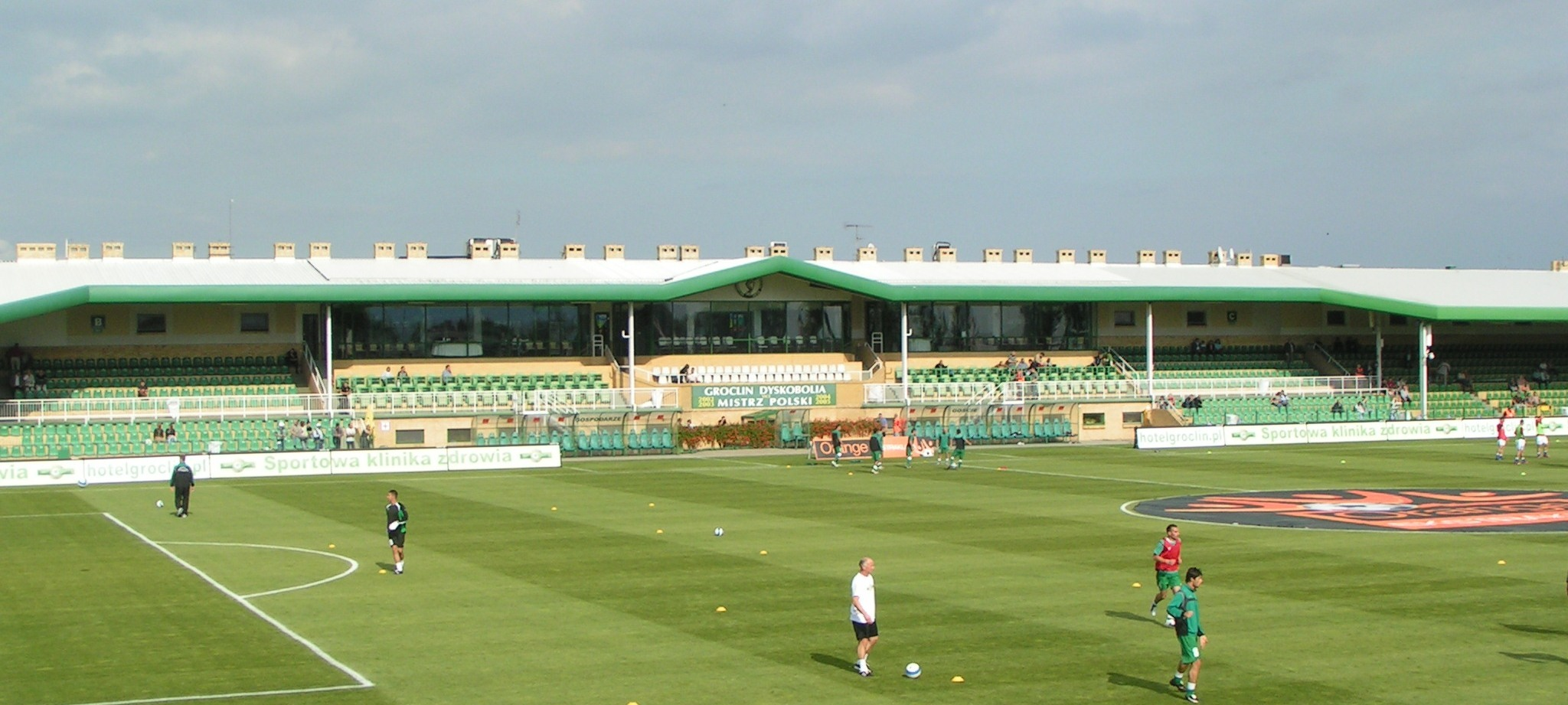
- Stadium Dyskobolii

Tournament details
- Country: Poland
- Teams: 62

Final positions
- Champions: None

Tournament statistics
- Matches played: 153
- Goals scored: 489 (3.2 per match)
- Top goal scorer(s): Arkadiusz Aleksander (9 goals)

The 2004–05 Polish Cup was the fifty-first season of the annual Polish cup competition. It began on 24 July 2004 with the Preliminary Round and ended on 21 June 2005 with second leg of the Final, played at Stadion Zagłębia Lubin, Lubin. The winners qualified for the second qualifying round of the UEFA Cup. Lech Poznań were the defending champions.

== Preliminary round ==
The matches took place on 24 July 2004.

Team 1	Score	Team 2
24 July 2004
Lechia Gdańsk	2–2 (a.e.t.) (4–2 p)	Jagiellonia II Białystok
MG MZKS Kozienice	w/o^{1}	Pogoń Staszów
Burza Gręboszów	0–2	Gawin Królewska Wola
Polonia Słubice	1–2 (a.e.t.)	Odra Chojna
Warta Poznań	0–2	Raków Częstochowa
Chemik/Zawisza Bydgoszcz	3–1	Huragan Morąg
Przebój Wolbrom	2–1	LZS Turbia
Łada Biłgoraj	1–0	WKS Wieluń

Notes

- Note 1: Pogoń Staszów withdrew from the competition.

== Round 1 ==
The matches took place on 3 and 4 August 2004.

Team 1	Score	Team 2
3 August 2004
Lechia Gdańsk	3–3 (a.e.t.) (0–2 p)	Szczakowianka Jaworzno
MG MZKS Kozienice	0–4	Świt Nowy Dwór Mazowiecki
Gawin Królewska Wola	1–2	Zagłębie Lubin
Odra Chojna	0–1	Arka Gdynia
Raków Częstochowa	2–3	GKS Bełchatów
Chemik/Zawisza Bydgoszcz	0–3	KSZO Ostrowiec Świętokrzyski
Przebój Wolbrom	1–4	Gornik Polkowice
Łada Biłgoraj	2–2 (a.e.t.) (2–4 p)	Piast Gliwice
Warmia Grajewo	1–4	Polonia Warsaw
Olimpia Sztum	2–0	Jagiellonia Białystok
Mazowsze Grójec	1–1 (a.e.t.) (2–1 p)	RKS Radomsko
Skalnik Gracze	2–1	Cracovia
Korona Kielce	3–0 (a.e.t.)	Widzew Łódź
FKS Stal Mielec	2–1	Aluminium Konin
Promień Żary	0–4	Podbeskidzie Bielsko-Biała
Koszarawa Żywiec	3–0	Polar Wrocław
Warta Sieradz	0–5	ŁKS Łódź
Drwęca Nowe Miasto Lubawskie	4–1	Ruch Chorzów
Stal Kraśnik	1–2 (a.e.t.)	Tłoki Gorzyce
Wisła II Kraków	1–2	Kujawiak Włocławek
Victoria Września	0–4	Kotwica Kołobrzeg
4 August 2004
Sparta Świdnica	2–3	Pogoń Szczecin

== Round 2 ==
The matches took place between 21 September and 5 December 2004.

=== Group 1 ===
Pos	Team	Pld	W	D	L	GF	GA	GD	Pts	Qualification	WIS	KOS	SZC	TŁO
1	Wisła Kraków	6	6	0	0	17	1	+16	18	Round 3		4–0	4–0	2–0
2	Koszarawa Żywiec	6	2	2	2	5	8	−3	8	Round 3	0–2		1–1	2–0
3	Szczakowianka Jaworzno	6	1	3	2	12	10	+2	6		1–2	0–0		9–2
4	Tłoki Gorzyce	6	0	1	5	4	19	−15	1		0–3	1–2	1–1	

=== Group 2 ===
Pos	Team	Pld	W	D	L	GF	GA	GD	Pts	Qualification	POG	LEG	MAZ	ŚWI
1	Pogoń Szczecin	6	4	0	2	17	5	+12	12	Round 3		3–0	8–1	3–0
2	Legia Warsaw	6	4	0	2	9	7	+2	12	Round 3	1–3		1–0	4–0
3	Mazowsze Grójec	6	2	0	4	6	13	−7	6		1–0	1–2		3–1
4	Świt Nowy Dwór Mazowiecki	6	2	0	4	4	11	−7	6		2–0	0–1	1–0	

=== Group 3 ===
Pos	Team	Pld	W	D	L	GF	GA	GD	Pts	Qualification	AMC	ZLU	GPO	KOT
1	Amica Wronki	6	5	1	0	15	5	+10	16	Round 3		2–1	1–1	5–1
2	Zagłębie Lubin	6	3	1	2	16	8	+8	10	Round 3	1–2		2–2	4–1
3	Górnik Polkowice	6	1	2	3	8	11	−3	5		0–3	0–2		4–0
4	Kotwica Kołobrzeg	6	1	0	5	7	22	−15	3		1–2	1–6	3–1	

=== Group 4 ===
Pos	Team	Pld	W	D	L	GF	GA	GD	Pts	Qualification	DSK	BEŁ	OSZ	PIA
1	Dyskobolia Grodzisk Wlkp.	6	5	1	0	15	5	+10	16	Round 3		1–1	3–2	3–0
2	GKS Bełchatów	6	4	1	1	21	5	+16	13	Round 3	1–2		9–1	2–1
3	Olimpia Sztum	6	1	1	4	9	23	−14	4		1–4	0–4		4–2
4	Piast Gliwice	6	0	1	5	4	16	−12	1		0–2	0–4	1–1	

=== Group 5 ===
Pos	Team	Pld	W	D	L	GF	GA	GD	Pts	Qualification	WPK	ODR	ŁKS	KUJ
1	Wisła Płock	6	4	2	0	15	8	+7	14	Round 3		1–1	2–1	3–2
2	Odra Wodzisław	6	2	4	0	10	4	+6	10	Round 3	1–1		3–0	3–0 (Note: Match awarded as Kujawiak Włocławek did not show up.)
3	ŁKS Łódź	6	2	1	3	12	11	+1	7		2–3	1–1		5–2
4	Kujawiak Włocławek	6	0	1	5	6	20	−14	1		1–5	1–1	0–3	

=== Group 6 ===
Pos	Team	Pld	W	D	L	GF	GA	GD	Pts	Qualification	KSZ	LPO	ARK	DRW
1	KSZO Ostrowiec Świętokrzyski	6	3	2	1	5	4	+1	11	Round 3		1–0	1–0	1–1
2	Lech Poznań	6	3	1	2	11	4	+7	10	Round 3	2–0		4–1	5–0
3	Arka Gdynia	6	1	3	2	5	8	−3	6		1–1	0–0		2–1
4	Drwęca Nowe Miasto Lubawskie	6	1	2	3	5	10	−5	5		0–1	2–0	1–1	

=== Group 7 ===
Pos	Team	Pld	W	D	L	GF	GA	GD	Pts	Qualification	GÓR	PBB	KAT	SKA
1	Górnik Zabrze	6	5	0	1	15	6	+9	15	Round 3		3–1	1–0	2–1
2	Podbeskidzie Bielsko-Biała	6	4	1	1	14	8	+6	13	Round 3	3–2		1–1	4–1
3	GKS Katowice	6	2	1	3	11	8	+3	7		1–2	1–2		3–0
4	Skalnik Gracze	6	0	0	6	4	22	−18	0		0–5	0–3	2–5	

=== Group 8 ===
Pos	Team	Pld	W	D	L	GF	GA	GD	Pts	Qualification	KOR	PWA	GKŁ	STA
1	Korona Kielce	6	4	1	1	16	8	+8	13	Round 3		1–3	2–2	4–0
2	Polonia Warsaw	6	3	2	1	9	5	+4	11	Round 3	1–3		1–0	1–1
3	Górnik Łęczna	6	2	2	2	5	6	−1	8		0–2	0–0		2–1
4	Stal Mielec	6	0	1	5	4	15	−11	1		2–4	0–3	0–1	

== Round 3 ==
The first legs took place between 5 and 24 March, when the second legs took place between 22 March and 13 April 2005.

Team 1	Agg.	Team 2	1st leg	2nd leg
Legia Warsaw	2–2 (3–2 p)	Górnik Zabrze	1–0	1–2 (a.e.t.)
Zagłębie Lubin	3–2	KSZO Ostrowiec Świętokrzyski	1–0	2–2
Odra Wodzisław	2–4	Dyskobolia Grodzisk Wlkp.	1–2	1–2
Lech Poznań	3–2	Amica Wronki	2–1	1–1
Wisła Kraków	7–2	Polonia Warsaw	5–0	2–2
Podbeskidzie Bielsko-Biała	1–2	Pogoń Szczecin	1–1	0–1
Koszarawa Żywiec	3–4	Korona Kielce	2–2	1–2
GKS Bełchatów	1–4	Wisła Płock	0–1	1–3

== Quarter-finals ==
The first legs took place on 10 and 11 May, when the second legs took place on 17 and 18 May 2005.

Team 1	Agg.	Team 2	1st leg	2nd leg
Lech Poznań	1–2	Legia Warsaw	0–0	1–2
Korona Kielce	4–6	Dyskobolia Grodzisk Wlkp.	2–4	2–2
Wisła Płock	1–4	Zagłębie Lubin	1–1	0–3
Pogoń Szczecin	0–1	Wisła Kraków	0–0	0–1

== Semi-finals ==
The first legs took place on 8 June, when the second legs took place on 15 June 2005.

Team 1	Agg.	Team 2	1st leg	2nd leg
Legia Warsaw	1–1 (1–4 p)	Dyskobolia Grodzisk Wlkp.	1–1	1–1 (a.e.t.)
Wisła Kraków	2–3	Zagłębie Lubin	1–0	1–3

== Final ==
=== First leg ===
18 June 2005
20:00 CEST (UTC+02:00)

Dyskobolia Grodzisk Wlkp.	2–0	Zagłębie Lubin
Piechniak 28'; Ślusarski 31'	Report

Stadion Dyskobolii Grodzisk Wielkopolski, Grodzisk Wielkopolski
Attendance: 4,000
Referee: Jacek Granat (Warsaw)

=== Second leg ===
21 June 2005
20:00 CEST (UTC+02:00)

Zagłębie Lubin	1–0	Dyskobolia Grodzisk Wlkp.
Iwański 22'	Report

Stadion Zagłębia Lubin, Lubin
Attendance: 8,000
Referee: Mirosław Ryszka (Warsaw)

Dyskobolia Grodzisk Wlkp. won 2–1 on aggregate, but on 2 September 2020, they were deprived of this title in connection with proven cases of corruption and the trophy was not awarded to any team.
