= Skalnik Gracze =

Polish football club

- Full name: Ludowy Klub Sportowy; Skalnik Gracze
- Founded: 1953; 73 years ago
- Ground: Gracze
- Capacity: 1000
- Chairman: Andrzej Miśta
- Manager: Grzegorz Kutyła
- League: Regional league Opole I
- 2025–26: Regional league Opole I, 10th of 16

Skalnik Gracze is a football club based in Gracze, Poland. It was founded in 1953. As of the 2025–26 season, they compete in the Opole I group of the regional league.
