= Gmina Tułowice =

Gmina Tułowice Tułowice Commune
- Gmina
- Coat of arms
- Interactive map of Gmina Tułowice
- Coordinates (Tułowice): 50°35′36″N 17°39′18″E
- Country: Poland
- Voivodeship: Opole
- County: Opole
- Seat: Tułowice

Area
  - Total: 81.13 km^{2} (31.32 sq mi)

Population (2019-06-30)
  - Total: 5,172
  - Density: 63.75/km^{2} (165.1/sq mi)
  - Urban: 4,011
  - Rural: 1,161
- Website: http://www.tulowice.pl

Gmina Tułowice is an urban-rural gmina (administrative district) in Opole County, Opole Voivodeship, in south-western Poland. Its seat is the town of Tułowice, which lies approximately 22 kilometres (14 mi) south-west of the regional capital Opole.

The gmina covers an area of 81.13 square kilometres (31.3 sq mi). As of 2019, its total population was 4,011.

== Villages ==
Apart from the town of Tułowice, Gmina Tułowice contains the villages and settlements of Goszczowice, Ligota Tułowicka, Skarbiszowice, Szydłów and Tułowice.

== Neighbouring communes ==
Commune Tułowice is bordered by the communes of Dąbrowa, Komprachcice, Korfantów, Łambinowice, Niemodlin and Prószków.

== Twin towns – sister cities ==
Gmina Tułowice is twinned with:

- Bělá pod Pradědem, Czech Republic
- Wendeburg, Germany
