= Arkadiusz Aleksander =

Polish footballer (born 1980)

Personal information
- Full name: Arkadiusz Aleksander
- Date of birth: 19 April 1980 (age 46)
- Place of birth: Nowy Sącz, Poland
- Height: 1.84 m (6 ft 0 in)
- Position: Striker

Team information
- Current team: Sandecja Nowy Sącz (co-owner)

Youth career
- 1985–1996: Zawada Nowy Sącz

Senior career*
Years	Team	Apps	(Gls)
1996–1998	SMS Wrocław		
1999	Rawia Rawicz		
1999–2003	Śląsk Wrocław	43	(7)
2001	→ Polar Wrocław (loan)	20	(7)
2004	Arka Gdynia	17	(4)
2004–2006	Górnik Zabrze	51	(15)
2006–2007	Widzew Łódź	5	(0)
2007–2008	Odra Wodzisław	33	(5)
2009	Nea Salamis Famagusta	9	(5)
2009–2012	Sandecja Nowy Sącz	93	(47)
2013	Flota Świnoujście	14	(6)
2013–2014	Arka Gdynia	32	(12)
2014–2015	Olimpia Grudziądz	24	(6)
2015–2016	Sandecja Nowy Sącz	31	(15)

International career
- Poland U15
- Poland U20
2004–2005	Poland B	2	(0)
- * Club domestic league appearances and goals

Arkadiusz Aleksander (born 19 April 1980) is a Polish football executive and former professional player who played as a striker. He co-owns II liga club Sandecja Nowy Sącz.

== Playing career ==
In 2015, Aleksander signed for Sandecja Nowy Sącz.

== Executive career ==
Following retirement, he was named the sporting director of Sandecja. He oversaw their first-ever promotion to Ekstraklasa in his first season, and left at the end of the 2017–18 campaign. He returned to the role on 30 July 2020, before being appointed by the board to become Sandecja's chairman in January 2021. On 16 July 2021, Aleksander resigned and left the club.

On 21 November 2022, after spending a year operating as I liga club Zagłębie Sosnowiec's vice-chairman, he was promoted to the role of chairman, a role he held until 16 May 2024.

On 27 June 2025, Aleksander and Grzegorz Stawiarski completed the take-over of Sandecja Nowy Sącz, purchasing 100% of the club shares previously owned by the city of Nowy Sącz.

== Honours ==
Individual

- Polish Cup top scorer: 2004–05
- Ekstraklasa Cup top scorer: 2007–08
