= Richard Thomalla =

WWII Nazi Germany official (1903–1945)

Richard Wolfgang Thomalla
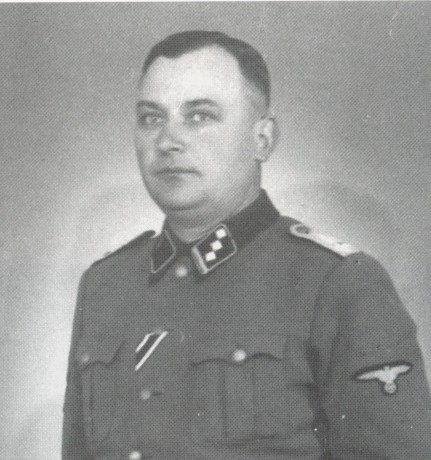
- Official portrait, c. 1940
- Born: 23 October 1903; Annahof, German Empire
- Died: 12 May 1945 (aged 41); Jičín, Czechoslovakia
- Cause of death: Execution by shooting
- Military career
- Allegiance: Nazi Germany
- Branch: Schutzstaffel
- Service years: 1932–1945
- Rank: SS-Hauptsturmführer
- Commands: Headed construction of Bełżec, Sobibor and Treblinka extermination camps during Operation Reinhard

Richard Thomalla (German: [toˈmala]; 23 October 1903 – 12 May 1945) was a German war criminal and SS commander of Nazi Germany. A civil engineer by profession, he was head of the SS Central Building Administration at Lublin reservation in occupied Poland. Thomalla was in charge of construction for the Operation Reinhard death camps Bełżec, Sobibor and Treblinka during the Holocaust in Poland.

== Operation Reinhardt ==
Born in Sabine in the former Upper Silesia region of the German Empire (now, the village of Sowin, Opole Voivodeship, Poland). Thomalla became a member of the Nazi Party in 1932: (no. 1,238,872) and Schutzstaffel (SS no. 41,206).

The first death camp to be constructed under Thomalla's supervision was Bełżec. Construction started on 1 November 1941 and was completed in March 1942. He then proceeded to design and supervise the construction of Sobibor in March 1942. Workers employed for building the camp were local people from neighboring villages and towns. These workers consisted of about eighty Jews from ghettos within the vicinity of the camp. A squad of ten watchmen trained at Trawniki concentration camp guarded these workers. Upon completion of the camp, these Jews were shot. When Thomalla completed his building assignment in Sobibor he was replaced there as commandant by Franz Stangl in April 1942. He then proceeded to Treblinka which copied the design of Sobibor, with some improvements.

SS commander Erwin Lambert who had previously been assigned to the Action T4 euthanasia program and had constructed the new gas chambers in Treblinka, testified about Thomalla:

I and Hengs – euthanasia man – went to Treblinka by car. SS-Hauptsturmführer Richard Thomalla was the camp commander. The Treblinka camp was still in the process of construction. Thomalla was in Treblinka for about four to eight weeks. I was attached to a building team there. Thomalla was there for a limited time only and conducted the construction work of the extermination camp. During that time no extermination actions were carried out. Then Dr. Eberl arrived as camp commander. Under his direction the extermination Aktionen of the Jews began. — Erwin Lambert

Between July 1942 and October 1943, around 850,000 people were murdered in Treblinka. Thomalla was reportedly executed by the NKVD (Soviet secret police) in Jičín, Czechoslovakia on 12 May 1945; he was formally declared dead in absentia by a court in Ulm in 1957.
