= Oskar Kellner =

German agricultural scientist (1851–1911)

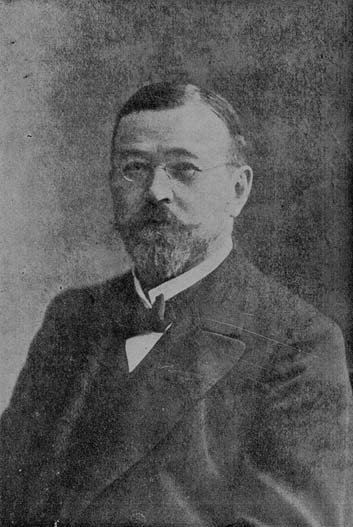
- Born: 13 May 1851; Tillowitz, Upper Silesia
- Died: 12 September 1911 (aged 60); Karlsruhe, Germany

Oskar (Oscar) Johann Kellner (13 May 1851 – 12 September 1911) was a German agricultural scientist (Agrikulturchemiker, Tierphysiologe).

== Biography ==
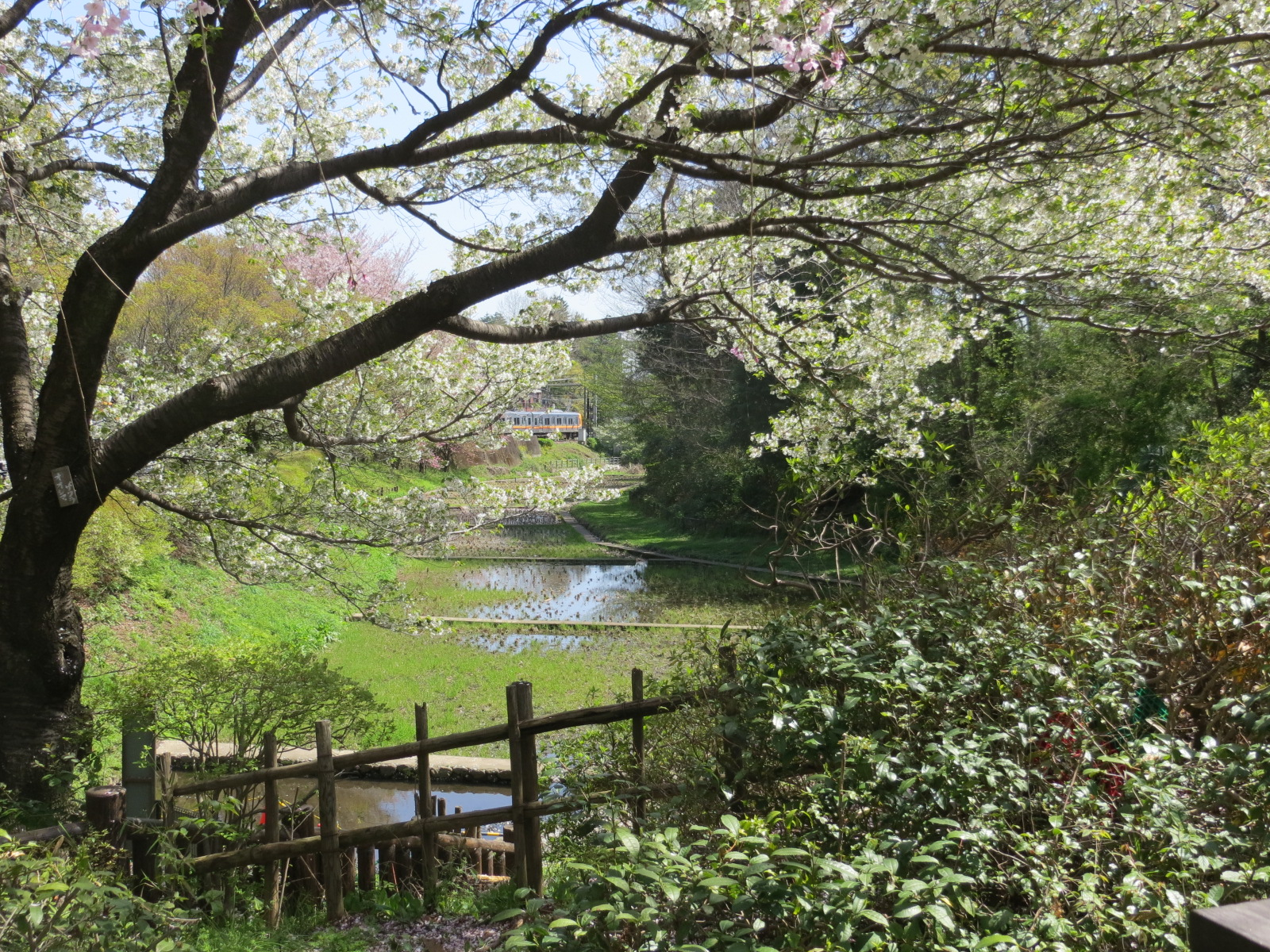
Komabano Park Kellner Rice Fields

Kellner was invited to teach in Japan as a foreign advisor by the Meiji government of the Empire of Japan to improve Japanese agricultural productivity.

Arriving on 5 November 1881, he taught at the Komaba Agricultural School in Tokyo, and its successor, the Tokyo Agriculture and Forestry School (now a department within Tokyo University), and also conducted research into chemical fertilizers. He is considered the "father" of Japanese agricultural chemistry. His nutritional analysis of livestock feed was called the "Kellner Standard" and was subsequently adopted by the Japanese livestock industry. Kellner returned to Germany on 31 December 1892.

The Kellner rice fields at Komabano Park, close to the University of Tokyo Komaba campus, serve as a lasting tribute to his research activities while in Japan.

== Works ==
- die Ernährung der landwirtschaftlichen Nutztiere, 1905
- Grundzüge der Fütteringslehre, 1907
