= Gmina Niemodlin =

Gmina Niemodlin Niemodlin Commune
- Gmina
- Flag Coat of arms
- Interactive map of Gmina Niemodlin
- Coordinates (Niemodlin): 50°38′N 17°36′E
- Country: Poland
- Voivodeship: Opole
- County: Opole
- Seat: Niemodlin

Area
  - Total: 183.22 km^{2} (70.74 sq mi)

Population (2019-06-30)
  - Total: 13,191
  - Density: 71.995/km^{2} (186.47/sq mi)
  - Urban: 6,315
  - Rural: 6,876
- Website: http://www.niemodlin.pl

Gmina Niemodlin is an urban-rural gmina (administrative district) in Opole County, Opole Voivodeship, in south-western Poland. Its seat is the town of Niemodlin, which lies approximately 24 kilometres (15 mi) west of the regional capital Opole.

The gmina covers an area of 183.22 square kilometres (70.7 sq mi), and as of 2019 its total population is 13,191.

== Villages ==
Apart from the town of Niemodlin, Gmina Niemodlin contains the villages and settlements of Brzęczkowice, Góra, Gościejowice, Grabin, Gracze, Grodziec, Jaczowice, Jakubowice, Krasna Góra, Lipno, Magnuszowice, Magnuszowiczki, Mała Góra, Michałówek, Molestowice, Piotrowa, Radoszowice, Rogi, Roszkowice, Rutki, Rzędziwojowice, Sady, Sarny Wielkie, Sosnówka, Szydłowiec Śląski, Tarnica, Tłustoręby and Wydrowice.

== Neighbouring gminas ==
Gmina Niemodlin is bordered by the gminas of Dąbrowa, Grodków, Łambinowice, Lewin Brzeski, Olszanka, Skoroszyce and Tułowice.

== Twin towns – sister cities ==
Gmina Niemodlin is twinned with:

- Dolyna, Ukraine
- Pražmo, Czech Republic
- Štíty, Czech Republic
- Vechelde, Germany
