= Sosnówka, Opole Voivodeship =

Sosnówka
- Location within Poland
- Coordinates: 50°39′09″N 17°40′33″E
- Country: Poland
- Voivodeship: Opole
- County: Opole
- Gmina: Niemodlin

Population
  - Total: 100 (2,005)
- Time zone: UTC+1 (CET)
  - Summer (DST): UTC+2 (CEST)
- Area code: +48 77
- Car plates: OPO

Sosnówka [sɔsˈnufka] (German: Kieferkretscham) is a village in the administrative district of Gmina Niemodlin, within Opole County, Opole Voivodeship, in south-western Poland.
