= Puszyna =

- Village
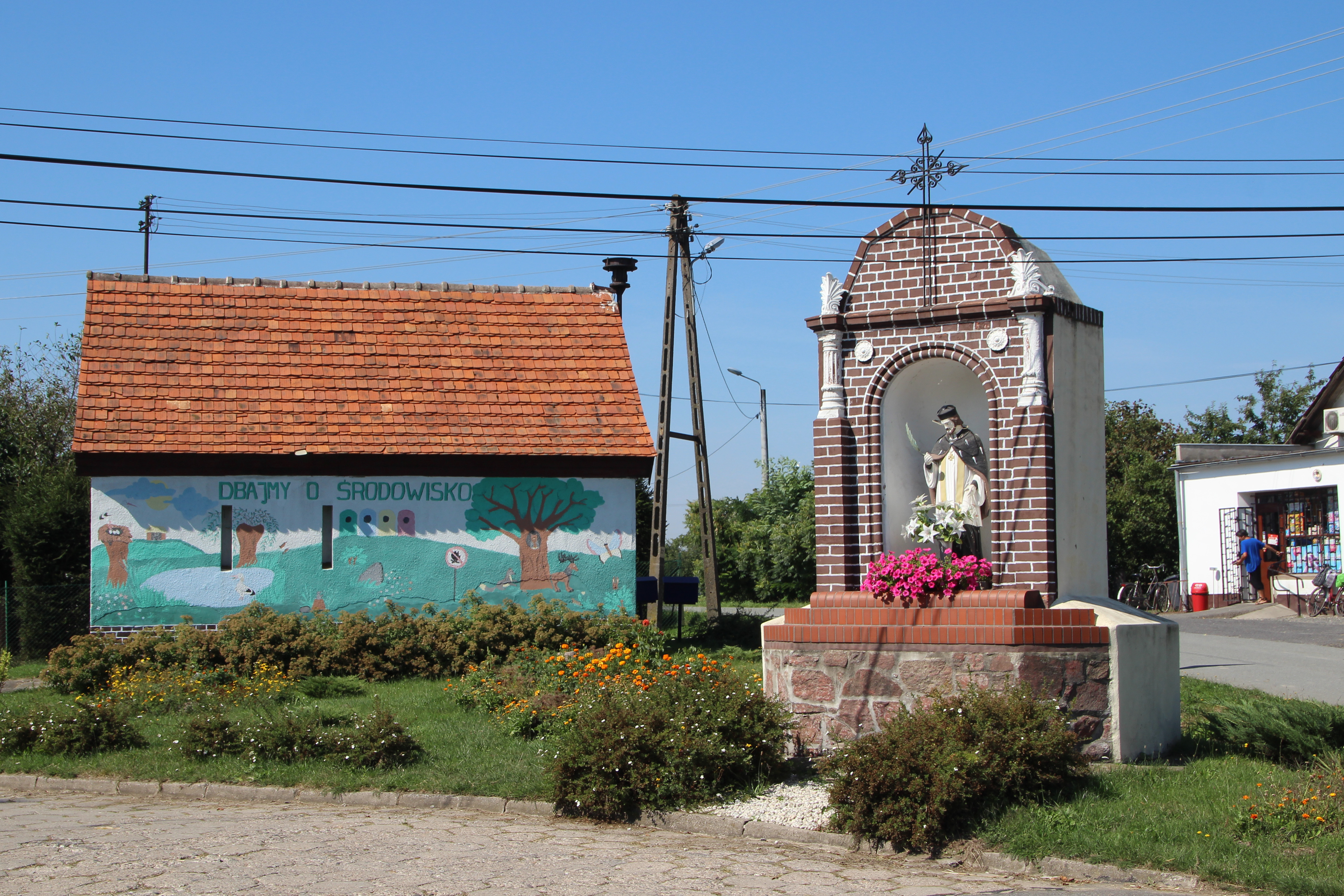

- Location within Poland
- Coordinates: 50°27′N 17°37′E
- Country: Poland
- Voivodeship: Opole
- County: Nysa
- Gmina: Korfantów
- Time zone: UTC+1 (CET)
  - Summer (DST): UTC+2 (CEST)
- Vehicle registration: ONY

Puszyna [puˈʂɨna] (German: Puschine) is a village in the administrative district of Gmina Korfantów, within Nysa County, Opole Voivodeship, in south-western Poland.

== History ==
The village dates back to the Middle Ages. Within Piast-ruled Poland, it was the location of a motte-and-bailey castle from the 10th-14th century, which is now an archaeological site. The region became part of the Holy Roman Empire, and, within the latter, the village was annexed by Prussia. In 1945, it became part of Poland following Germany's defeat in World War II.
