= Skarbiszowice =

- Village
- Location within Poland
- Coordinates: 50°36′29″N 17°40′34″E
- Country: Poland
- Voivodeship: Opole
- County: Opole
- Gmina: Tułowice

Skarbiszowice [skarbiʂɔˈvit͡sɛ] (German: Seifersdorf) is a village in the administrative district of Gmina Tułowice, within Opole County, Opole Voivodeship, in south-western Poland.
