= Radoszowice =

- Village
- Location within Poland
- Coordinates: 50°42′N 17°31′E
- Country: Poland
- Voivodeship: Opole
- County: Opole
- Gmina: Niemodlin
- First mentioned: 1228
- Time zone: UTC+1 (CET)
  - Summer (DST): UTC+2 (CEST)
- Vehicle registration: OPO

Radoszowice [radɔʂɔˈvit͡sɛ] (German: Raschwitz) is a village in the administrative district of Gmina Niemodlin, within Opole County, Opole Voivodeship, in south-western Poland.

== History ==
The village was first mentioned under the Latinized name Radosevici in a document of Duke Casimir I of Opole from 1228, when it was part of fragmented Piast-ruled Poland. The name is of Polish origin and comes from the word radość, which means "joy".

Later on, the village was part of Bohemia (Czechia), Prussia and Germany. In 1936, during a massive Nazi campaign of renaming of placenames, the name of the village was Germanized to Rauschwalde to erase traces of Polish origin. During World War II, the German administration operated the E25 forced labour subcamp of the Stalag VIII-B/344 prisoner-of-war camp in the village. After the defeat of Germany in the war, in 1945, the village became again part of Poland and the historic name was restored.

== Transport ==
The Polish A4 motorway runs nearby, north of the village.
