= Michałówek, Opole Voivodeship =

Michałówek
- Village
- Location within Poland
- Coordinates: 50°38′49″N 17°39′54″E
- Country: Poland
- Voivodeship: Opole
- County: Opole
- Gmina: Niemodlin

Michałówek [mixaˈwuvɛk] (German: Michelsdorf) is a village in the administrative district of Gmina Niemodlin, within Opole County, Opole Voivodeship, in south-western Poland.
