= Siedliska, Opole County =

Siedliska
- Village
- Location within Poland
- Coordinates: 50°39′N 17°44′E
- Country: Poland
- Voivodeship: Opole
- County: Opole
- Gmina: Dąbrowa
- Time zone: UTC+1 (CET)
  - Summer (DST): UTC+2 (CEST)
- Vehicle registration: OPO

Siedliska [ɕɛdˈlʲiska] is a village in the administrative district of Gmina Dąbrowa, within Opole County, Opole Voivodeship, in southern Poland.

== History ==
In the 10th century the area became part of the emerging Polish state, and later on, it was part of Poland, Bohemia (Czechia), Prussia, and Germany. In 1936, during a massive Nazi campaign of renaming of placenames, the village was renamed to Waldsiedel to erase traces of Polish origin. During World War II, the Germans operated the E323 forced labour subcamp of the Stalag VIII-B/344 prisoner-of-war camp in the village. After the defeat of Germany in the war, in 1945, the village became again part of Poland and its historic name was restored.
