= Molestowice =

- Village
- Location within Poland
- Coordinates: 50°40′56″N 17°34′31″E
- Country: Poland
- Voivodeship: Opole
- County: Opole
- Gmina: Niemodlin
- Population: 100

Molestowice [mɔlɛstɔˈvit͡sɛ] (German: Mullwitz) is a village in the administrative district of Gmina Niemodlin, within Opole County, Opole Voivodeship, in south-western Poland.
