= Roszkowice, Gmina Niemodlin =

Roszkowice
- Village
- Location within Poland
- Coordinates: 50°39′N 17°34′E
- Country: Poland
- Voivodeship: Opole
- County: Opole
- Gmina: Niemodlin

Roszkowice [rɔʂkɔˈvit͡sɛ] (German: Rossdorf) is a village in the administrative district of Gmina Niemodlin, within Opole County, Opole Voivodeship, in south-western Poland.
