= Włostowa =

- Village
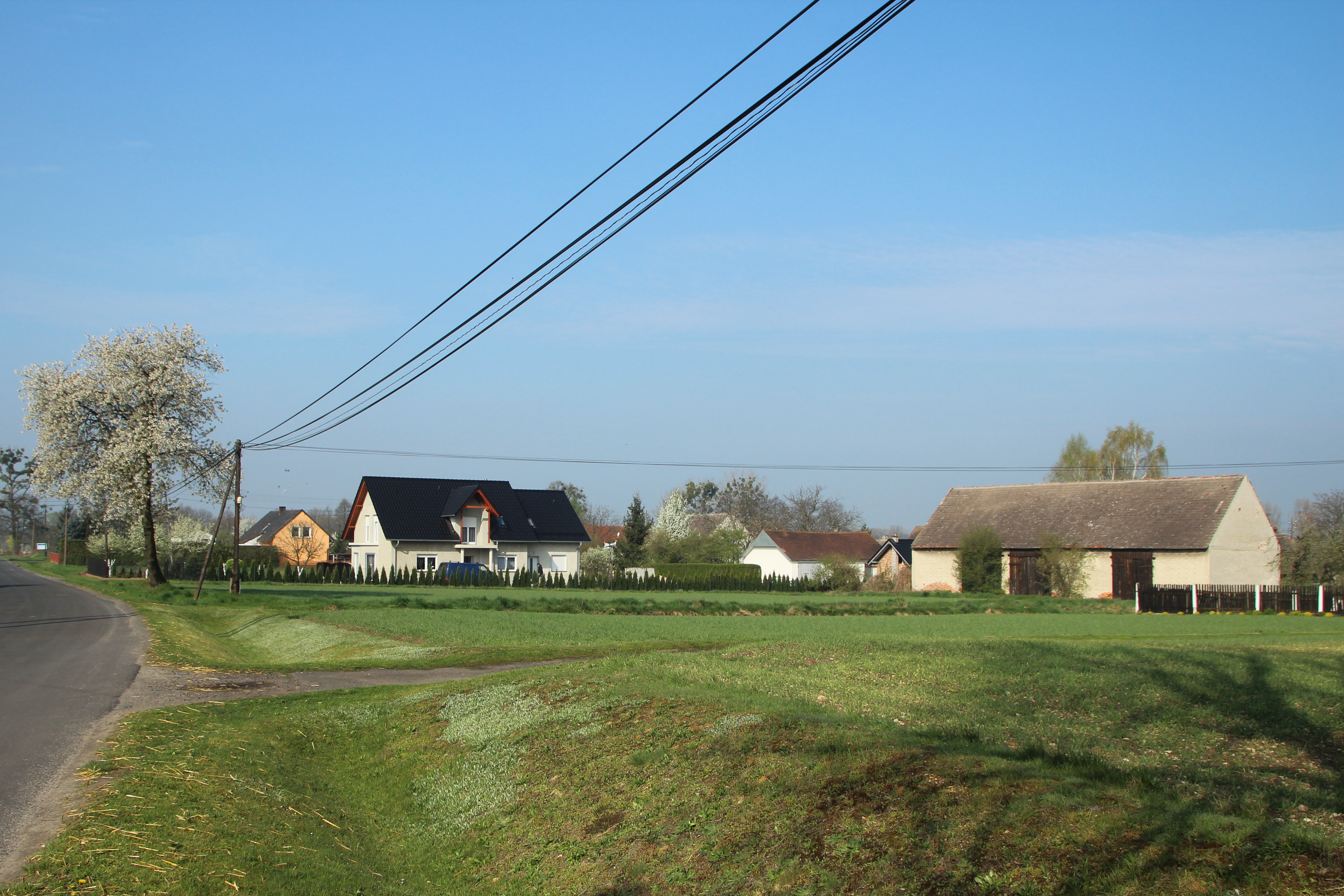

- Location within Poland
- Coordinates: 50°30′N 17°38′E
- Country: Poland
- Voivodeship: Opole
- County: Nysa
- Gmina: Korfantów

Włostowa [vwɔsˈtɔva] (German: Floste) is a village in the administrative district of Gmina Korfantów, within Nysa County, Opole Voivodeship, in South-Western Poland.
