= Szydłowiec Śląski =

- Village
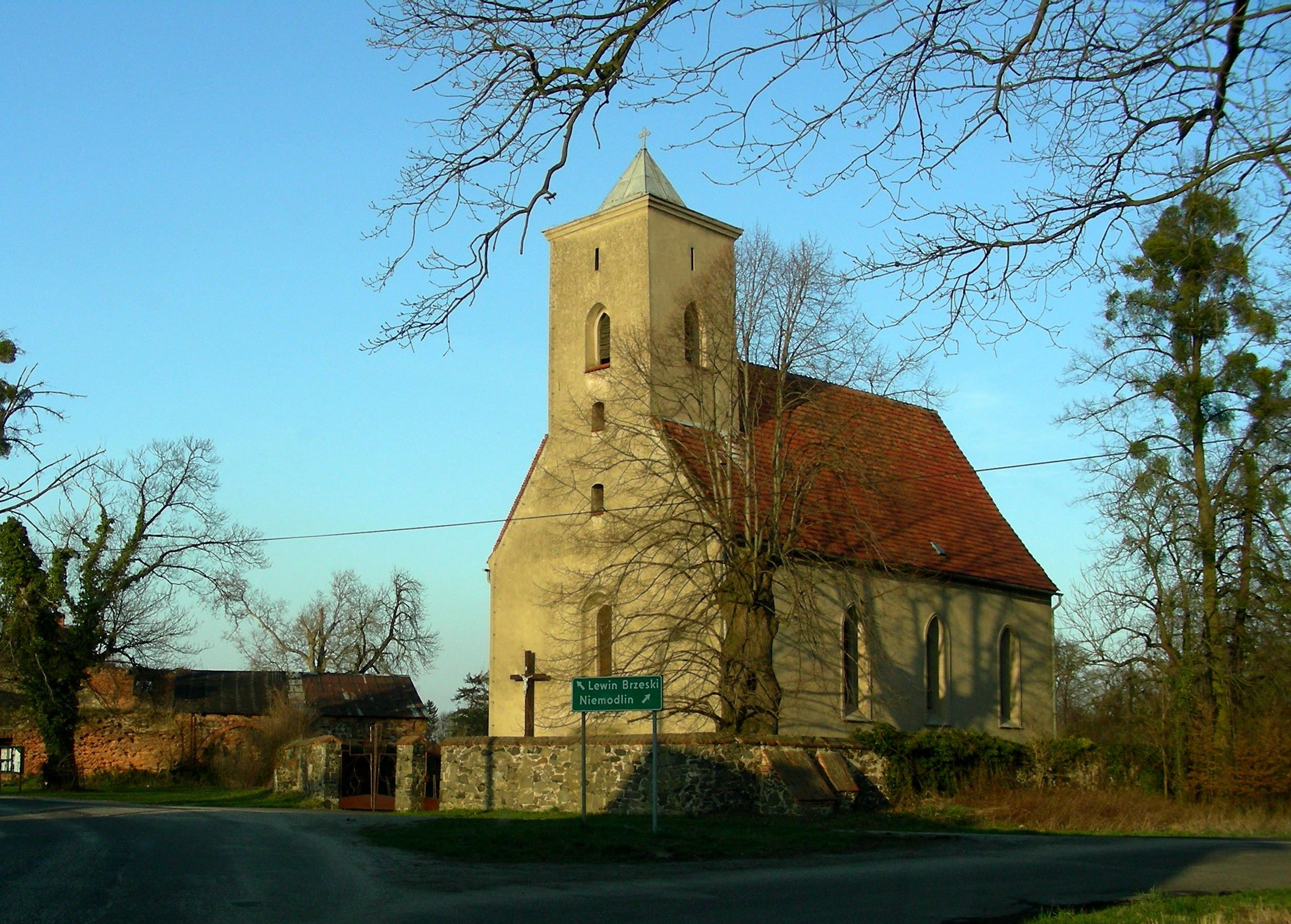
- Church of the Holy Name of Mary

- Location within Poland
- Coordinates: 50°40′N 17°36′E
- Country: Poland
- Voivodeship: Opole
- County: Opole
- Gmina: Niemodlin

Population
  - Total: 121

Szydłowiec Śląski (Polish pronunciation: [ʂɨˈdwɔvjɛt͡s ˈɕlɔ̃skʲi], German: Schedlau) is a village in the administrative district of Gmina Niemodlin, within Opole County, Opole Voivodeship, in south-western Poland.

== People ==
- Erdmann von Pückler (1792-1869), Prussian politician and agriculture minister in Prussia, died in Schedlau
