= Gościejowice =

- Village
- Location within Poland
- Coordinates: 50°39′21″N 17°38′35″E
- Country: Poland
- Voivodeship: Opole
- County: Opole
- Gmina: Niemodlin
- Population: 332

Gościejowice (Polish: [ɡɔɕt͡ɕɛjɔˈvit͡sɛ], German: Heidersdorf) is a village in the administrative district of Gmina Niemodlin, within Opole County, Opole Voivodeship, in south-western Poland.
