= Magnuszowiczki =

Village in Poland

- Village
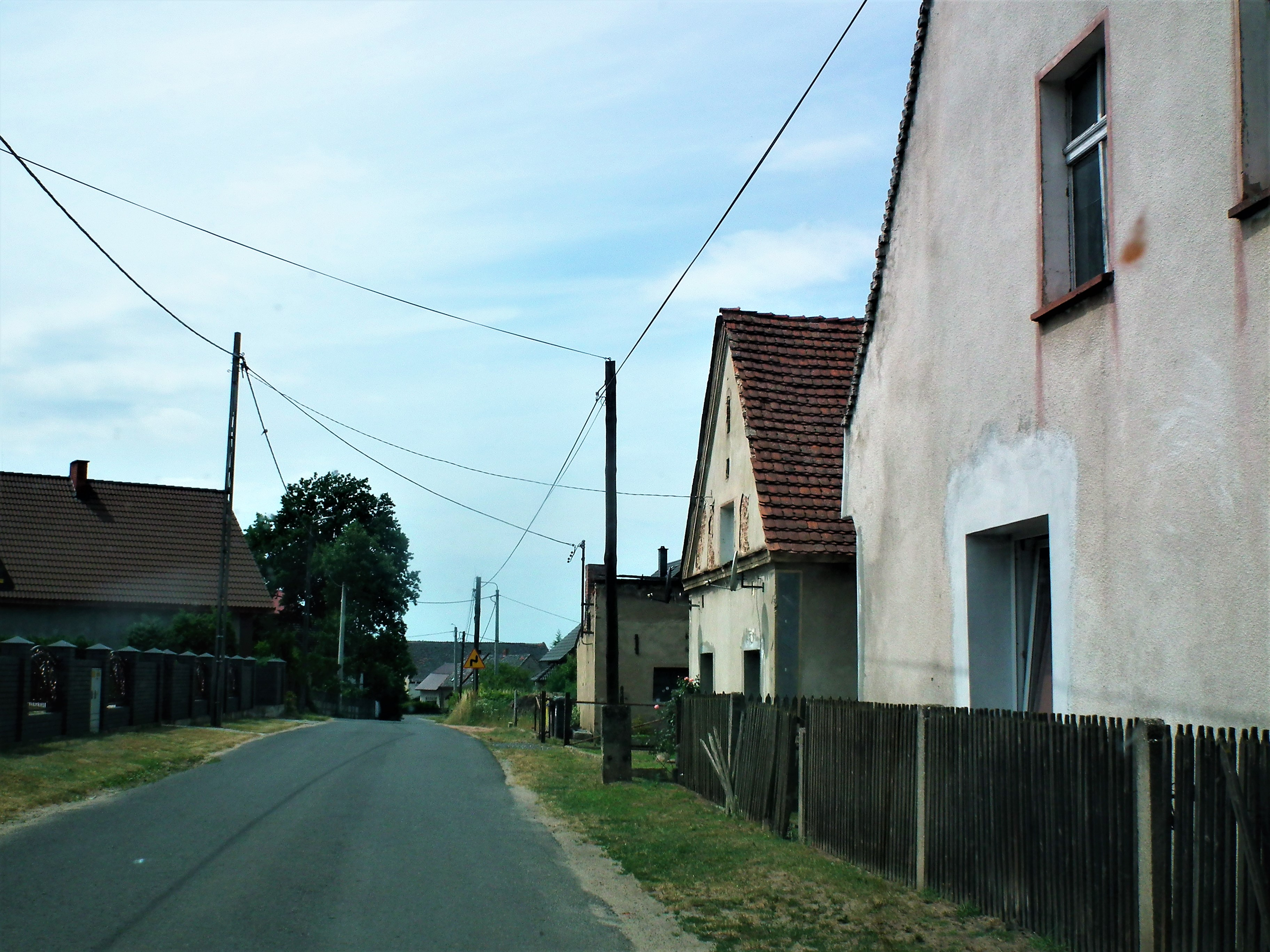

- Location within Poland
- Coordinates: 50°41′38″N 17°36′45″E
- Country: Poland
- Voivodeship: Opole
- County: Opole
- Gmina: Niemodlin
- Time zone: UTC+01:00 (CET)
  - Summer (DST): UTC+02:00 (CEST)
- Postal code: 49-156

Magnuszowiczki [maɡnuʂɔˈvit͡ʂki] (German: Klein Mangersdorf) is a village in the administrative district of Gmina Niemodlin in Opole County, Opole Voivodeship in southwestern Poland.

== History ==
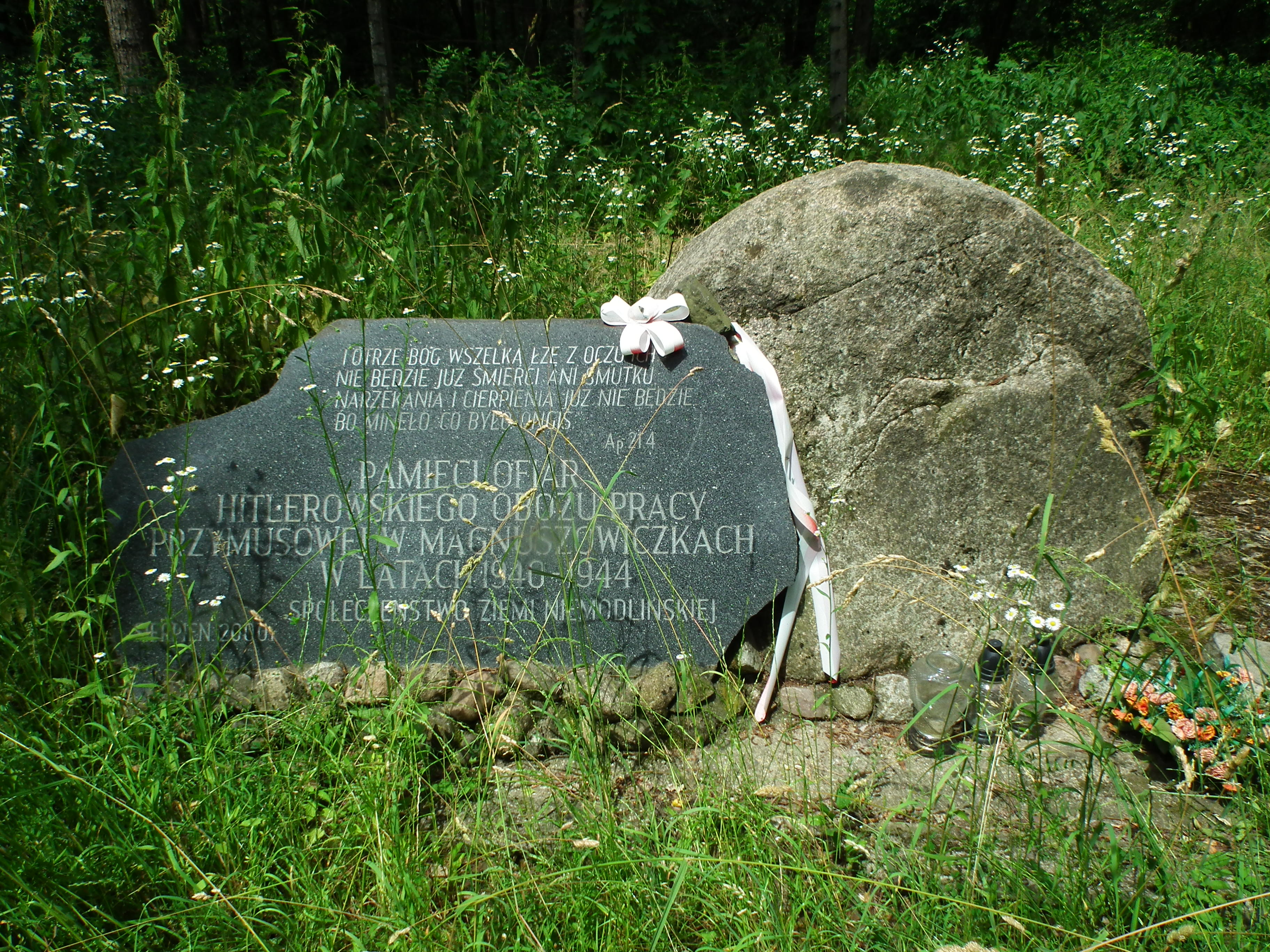
Memorial at the site of the former Nazi German forced labour camp

The village's history dates back to medieval Poland. During World War II, from 1940 to 1944, a Nazi German forced labour camp for Jews, and initially also Poles, was located there. There is a memorial at the site.
