= Rutki, Opole Voivodeship =

Rutki
- Village
- Location within Poland
- Coordinates: 50°41′N 17°33′E
- Country: Poland
- Voivodeship: Opole
- County: Opole
- Gmina: Niemodlin

Rutki [ˈrutki] (German: Rautke) is a village in the administrative district of Gmina Niemodlin, within Opole County, Opole Voivodeship, in south-western Poland.
