= Rogi, Opole Voivodeship =

Rogi
- Village
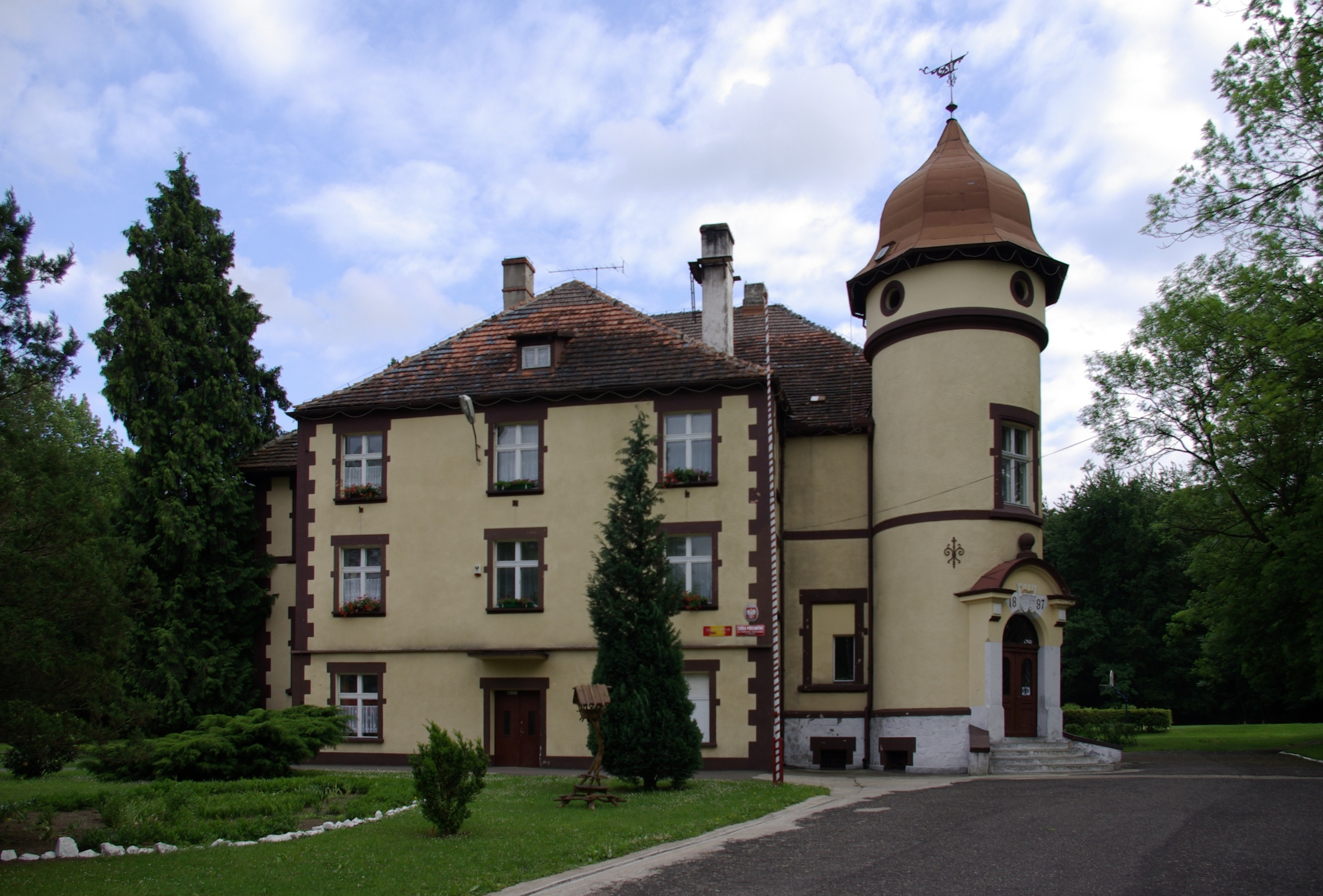
- Castle

- Location within Poland
- Coordinates: 50°39′N 17°31′E
- Country: Poland
- Voivodeship: Opole
- County: Opole
- Gmina: Niemodlin
- Population (approx.): 150

Rogi [ˈrɔɡi] (German: Rogau) is a village in the administrative district of Gmina Niemodlin, within Opole County, Opole Voivodeship, in south-western Poland.
