= Tarnica, Opole Voivodeship =

Tarnica
- Village
- Location within Poland
- Coordinates: 50°40′18″N 17°30′25″E
- Country: Poland
- Voivodeship: Opole
- County: Opole
- Gmina: Niemodlin

Tarnica [tarˈnit͡sa] (German: Tarnitze) is a village in the administrative district of Gmina Niemodlin, within Opole County, Opole Voivodeship, in south-western Poland.
