= Jakubowice, Gmina Niemodlin =

Jakubowice
- Village
- Location within Poland
- Coordinates: 50°35′N 17°33′E
- Country: Poland
- Voivodeship: Opole
- County: Opole
- Gmina: Niemodlin
- Population: 123

Jakubowice [jakubɔˈvit͡sɛ] (German: Jakobsdorf) is a village in the administrative district of Gmina Niemodlin, within Opole County, Opole Voivodeship, in south-western Poland.
