= Wydrowice =

- Village
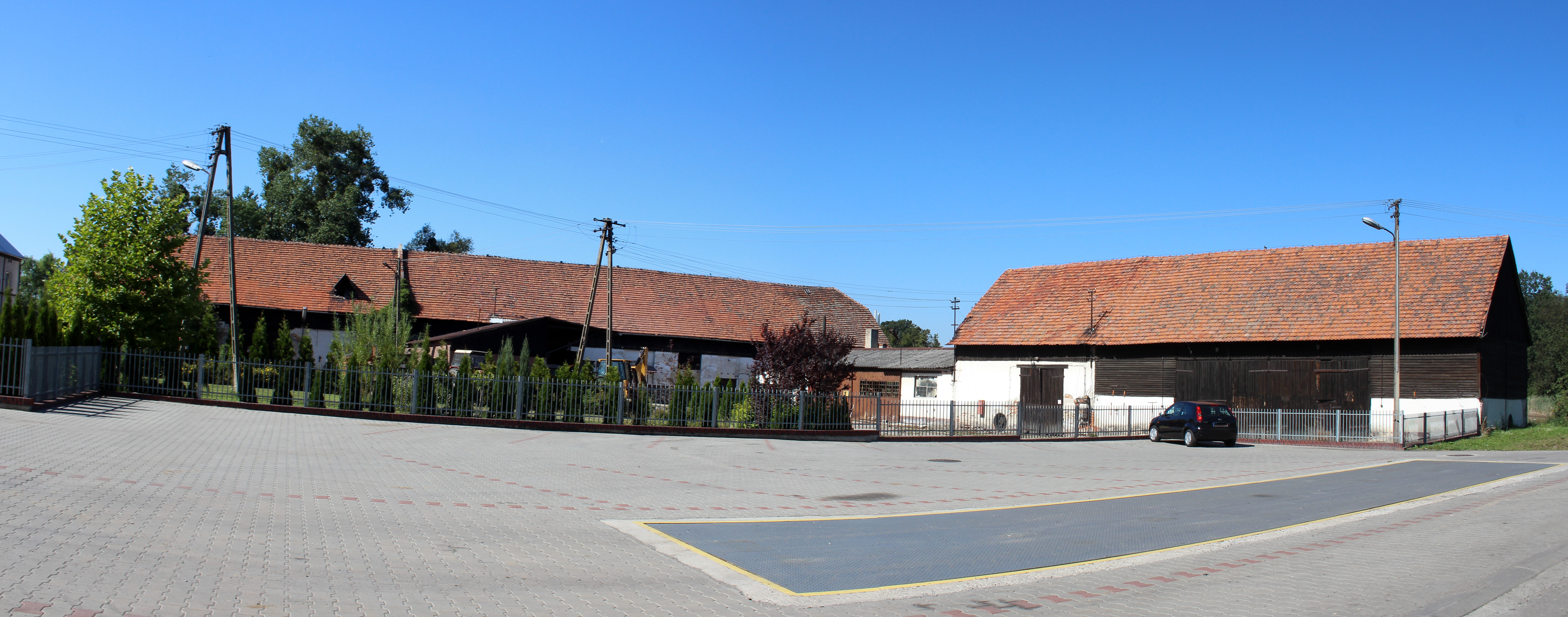

- Location within Poland
- Coordinates: 50°37′N 17°39′E
- Country: Poland
- Voivodeship: Opole
- County: Opole
- Gmina: Niemodlin

Wydrowice [vɨdrɔˈvit͡sɛ] (German: Weiderwitz) is a village in the administrative district of Gmina Niemodlin, within Opole County, Opole Voivodeship, in south-western Poland.
