= Grodziec, Gmina Niemodlin =

Grodziec
- Village
- Location within Poland
- Coordinates: 50°38′04″N 17°41′02″E
- Country: Poland
- Voivodeship: Opole
- County: Opole
- Gmina: Niemodlin
- Population: 34

Grodziec [ˈɡrɔd͡ʑɛt͡s] (German: Groditz) is a village in the administrative district of Gmina Niemodlin, within Opole County, Opole Voivodeship, in south-western Poland.
