= Mała Góra =

- Location within Poland
- Coordinates: 50°40′21″N 17°33′51″E
- Country: Poland
- Voivodeship: Opole
- County: Opole
- Gmina: Niemodlin
- Time zone: UTC+1 (CET)
  - Summer (DST): UTC+2 (CEST)
- Area code: +48 77
- Car plates: OPO

Mała Góra [ˈmawa ˈɡura] (German: Klein Guhrau) is a hamlet in the administrative district of Gmina Niemodlin, within Opole County, Opole Voivodeship, in south-western Poland.

== See also ==
- Boris Malagurski
