= Brzęczkowice, Opole Voivodeship =

Brzęczkowice
- Village
- Location within Poland
- Coordinates: 50°37′38″N 17°35′10″E
- Country: Poland
- Voivodeship: Opole
- County: Opole
- Gmina: Niemodlin
- Time zone: UTC+1 (CET)
  - Summer (DST): UTC+2 (CEST)
- Vehicle registration: OPO

Brzęczkowice [bʐɛnt͡ʂkɔˈvit͡sɛ] (German: Springsdorf) is a village in the administrative district of Gmina Niemodlin, within Opole County, Opole Voivodeship, in south-western Poland.

== History ==
The village dates back to the Middle Ages, when it was part of Piast-ruled Poland, and was mentioned in the Liber fundationis episcopatus Vratislaviensis from ca. 1295–1305. Later on, it was also part of Bohemia (Czechia), Prussia, and Germany, before it became again part of Poland following Germany's defeat in World War II in 1945.
