= Ligota Tułowicka =

- Village
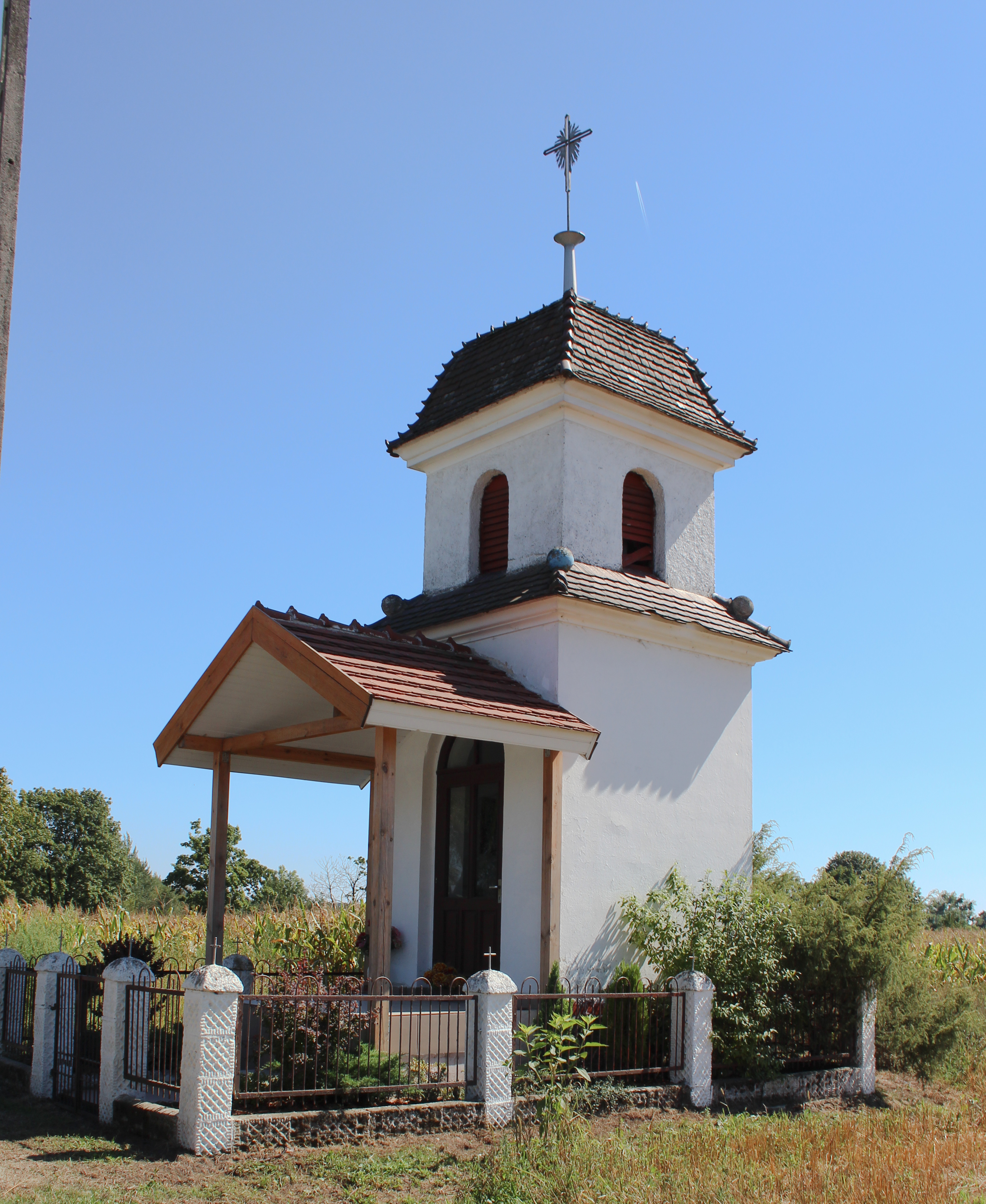
- Chapel

- Location within Poland
- Coordinates: 50°35′N 17°41′E
- Country: Poland
- Voivodeship: Opole
- County: Opole
- Gmina: Tułowice

Ligota Tułowicka [liˈɡɔta tuwɔˈvit͡ska] (German: Ellguth-Tillowitz) is a village in the administrative district of Gmina Tułowice, within Opole County, Opole Voivodeship, and in south-western Poland.
