= Lipno, Opole Voivodeship =

Lipno
- Village
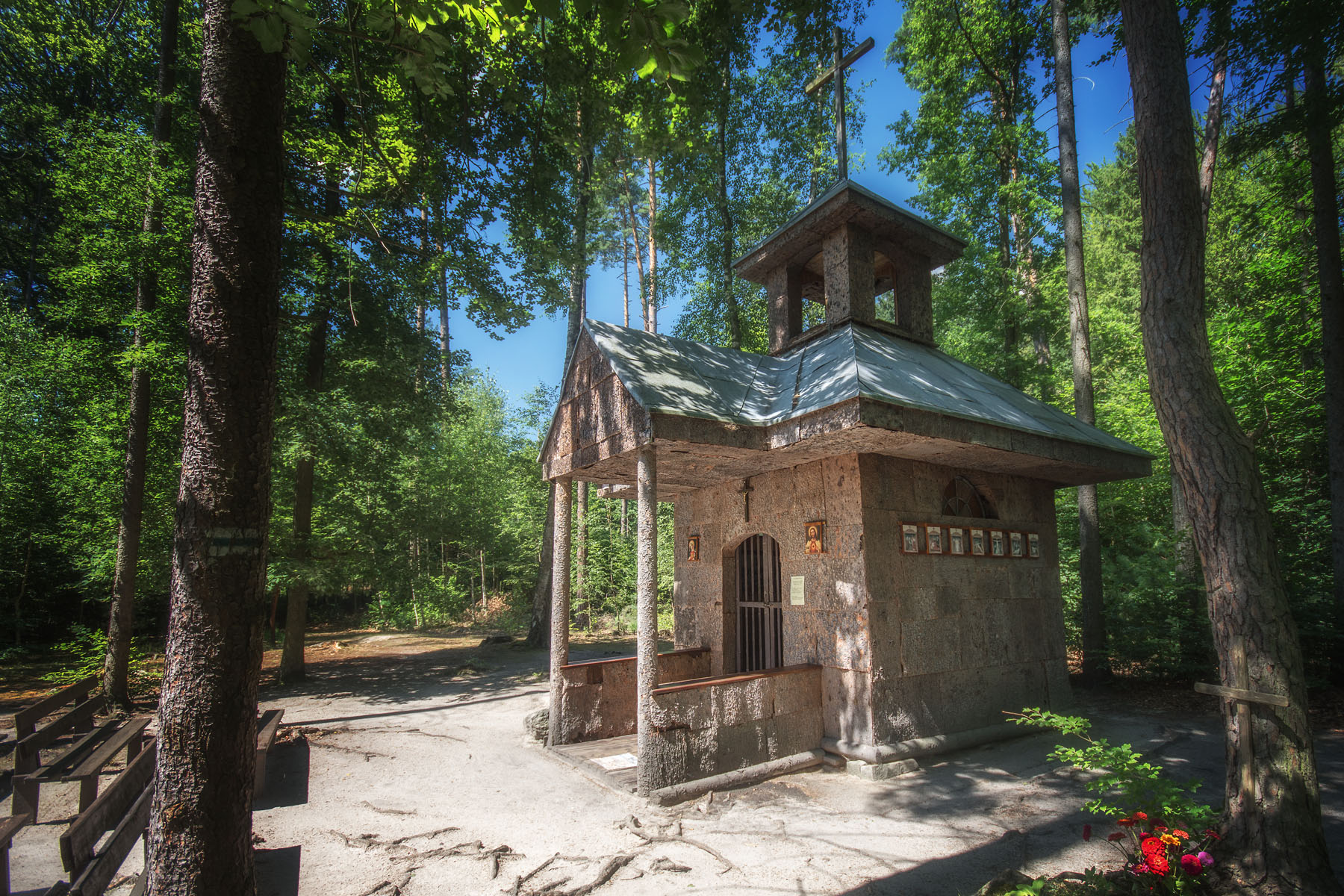
- Chapel

- Location within Poland
- Coordinates: 50°36′41″N 17°36′45″E
- Country: Poland
- Voivodeship: Opole
- County: Opole
- Gmina: Niemodlin
- Population: 200

Lipno (Polish: [ˈlipnɔ]; German: Lippen) is a village in the administrative district of Gmina Niemodlin, within Opole County, Opole Voivodeship, in south-western Poland.
