= Piechocice =

- Village
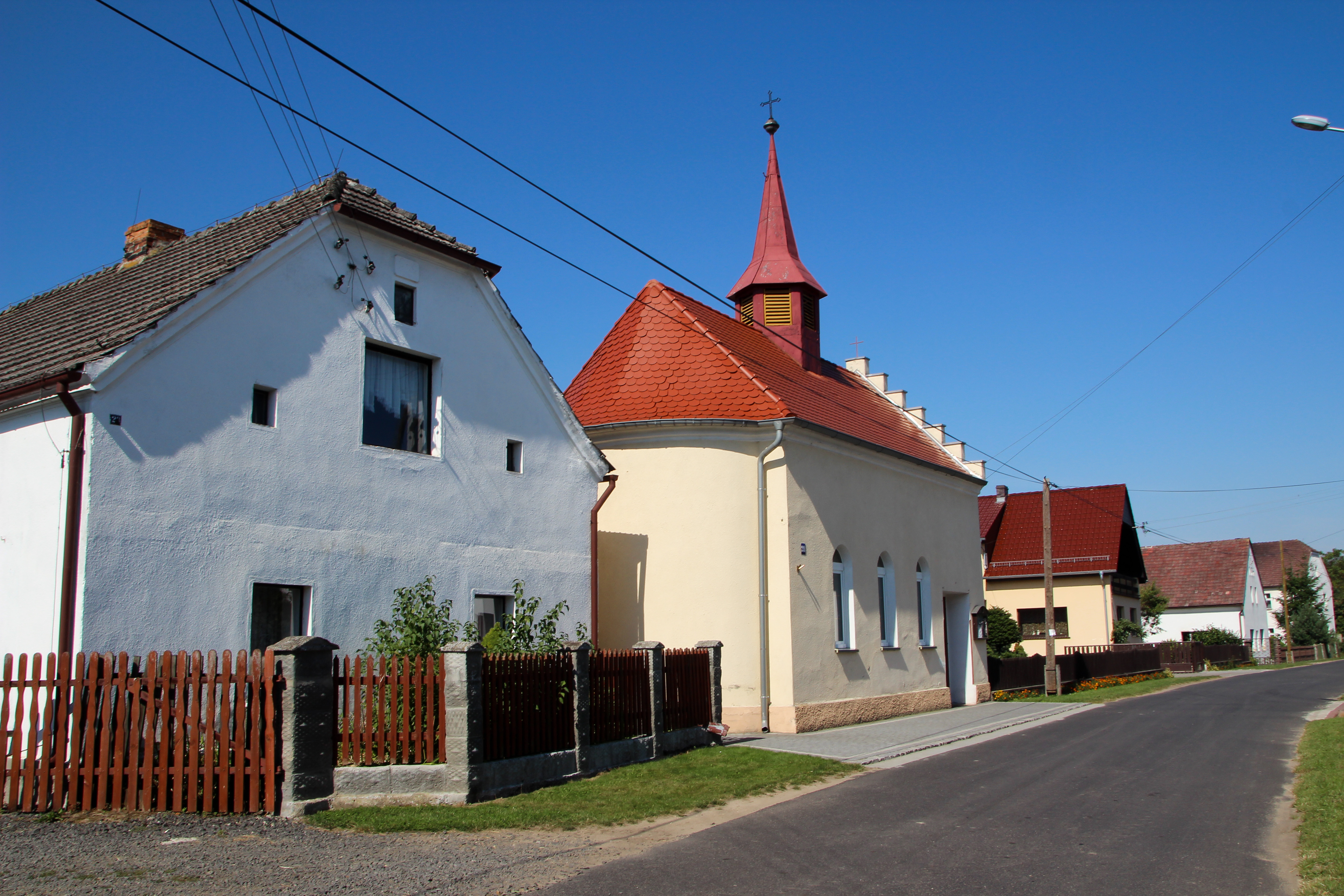

- Location within Poland
- Coordinates: 50°28′N 17°40′E
- Country: Poland
- Voivodeship: Opole
- County: Nysa
- Gmina: Korfantów

Piechocice [pjɛxɔˈt͡ɕit͡sɛ] (German: Piechotzütz) is a village in the administrative district of Gmina Korfantów, within Nysa County, Opole Voivodeship, in south-western Poland.
