= Sarny Wielkie =

- Village
- Location within Poland
- Coordinates: 50°45′N 17°32′E
- Country: Poland
- Voivodeship: Opole
- County: Opole
- Gmina: Niemodlin

Sarny Wielkie [ˈsarnɨ ˈvjɛlkʲɛ] (German: Gross Sarne) is a village in the administrative district of Gmina Niemodlin, within Opole County, Opole Voivodeship, in south-western Poland.
