= Piotrowa =

- Village
- Location within Poland
- Coordinates: 50°39′N 17°36′E
- Country: Poland
- Voivodeship: Opole
- County: Opole
- Gmina: Niemodlin

Piotrowa [pjɔˈtrɔva] (German: Petersdorf) is a village in the administrative district of Gmina Niemodlin, within Opole County, Opole Voivodeship, in south-western Poland.
