= Tłustoręby =

- Village
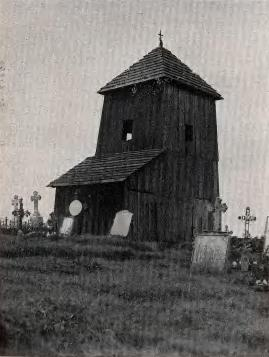
- Chapel

- Location within Poland
- Coordinates: 50°39′23″N 17°29′33″E
- Country: Poland
- Voivodeship: Opole
- County: Opole
- Gmina: Niemodlin

Tłustoręby [twustɔˈrɛmbɨ] (German: Kirchberg) is a village in the administrative district of Gmina Niemodlin, within Opole County, Opole Voivodeship, in south-western Poland.
