= Jaczowice =

- Village
- Location within Poland
- Coordinates: 50°37′N 17°35′E
- Country: Poland
- Voivodeship: Opole
- County: Opole
- Gmina: Niemodlin

Jaczowice [jat͡ʂɔˈvit͡sɛ] (German: Jatzdorf) is a village in the administrative district of Gmina Niemodlin, within Opole County, Opole Voivodeship, in south-western Poland.
