= Budzieszowice =

- Village
- Location within Poland
- Coordinates: 50°31′7″N 17°32′40″E
- Country: Poland
- Voivodeship: Opole
- County: Nysa
- Gmina: Łambinowice
- Population: 352

Budzieszowice [bud͡ʑɛʂɔˈvit͡sɛ] (German: Bauschwitz) is a village in the administrative district of Gmina Łambinowice, within Nysa County, Opole Voivodeship, in south-western Poland.
