= Jamka State =

Indian village

Jamka is a village and former Rajput non-salute princely state on Saurashtra peninsula, in Gujarat, Western India.

== History ==
The petty princely state, in Sorath prant, was ruled by Jivku Aughad Vala. Kathi chieftains. Jivku Aughad Vala was the ruler of Jamka. He was a very pious and emotional man. He was served by a very clever and loyal administrator Premji nathu Kamdar (Vyas). Jivku Aughad Vala was slaughtered due to royal rivalry. After this mishappening, Premji nathu vyas (Kamdar) protected the heir of the king and ruled on his behalf for 18 years. For this bravery and faithfulness towards the kingdom and the royalty, he was awarded half of the kingdom. In 1901, it comprised only the single village, with a population of 601, yielding 15,000 rupees state revenue (1903–04, less than half from land), paying 185 Rupees tribute to the Gaekwad Baroda State.
