= Sady, Opole Voivodeship =

Sady
- Village
- Location within Poland
- Coordinates: 50°38′N 17°40′E
- Country: Poland
- Voivodeship: Opole
- County: Opole
- Gmina: Niemodlin

Sady [ˈsadɨ] (German: Baumgarten) is a village in the administrative district of Gmina Niemodlin, within Opole County, Opole Voivodeship, in south-western Poland.
