= Grabin, Opole Voivodeship =

Grabin
- Village
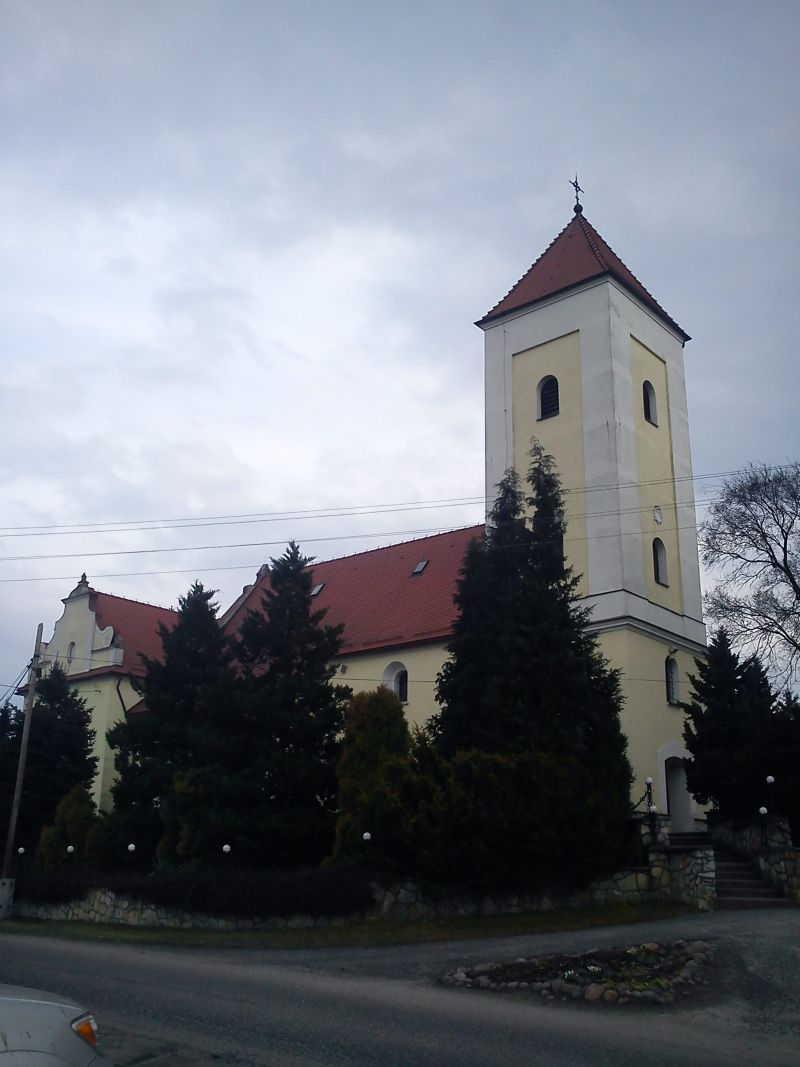
- Saint Nicholas church

- Location within Poland
- Coordinates: 50°36′N 17°31′E
- Country: Poland
- Voivodeship: Opole
- County: Opole
- Gmina: Niemodlin
- Population: 645

Grabin [ˈɡrabin] (German: Grüben) is a village in the administrative district of Gmina Niemodlin, within Opole County, Opole Voivodeship, in south-western Poland.

The village had a population of 645 as of 2015.
