= Góra, Opole Voivodeship =

Góra
- Village
- Location within Poland
- Coordinates: 50°41′N 17°35′E
- Country: Poland
- Voivodeship: Opole
- County: Opole
- Gmina: Niemodlin
- Time zone: UTC+1 (CET)
  - Summer (DST): UTC+2 (CEST)

Góra [ˈɡura] (German: Guhrau) is a village in the administrative district of Gmina Niemodlin, within Opole County, Opole Voivodeship, in southern Poland.

The name of the village is of Polish origin and means "hill".
