= Magnuszowice =

- Village
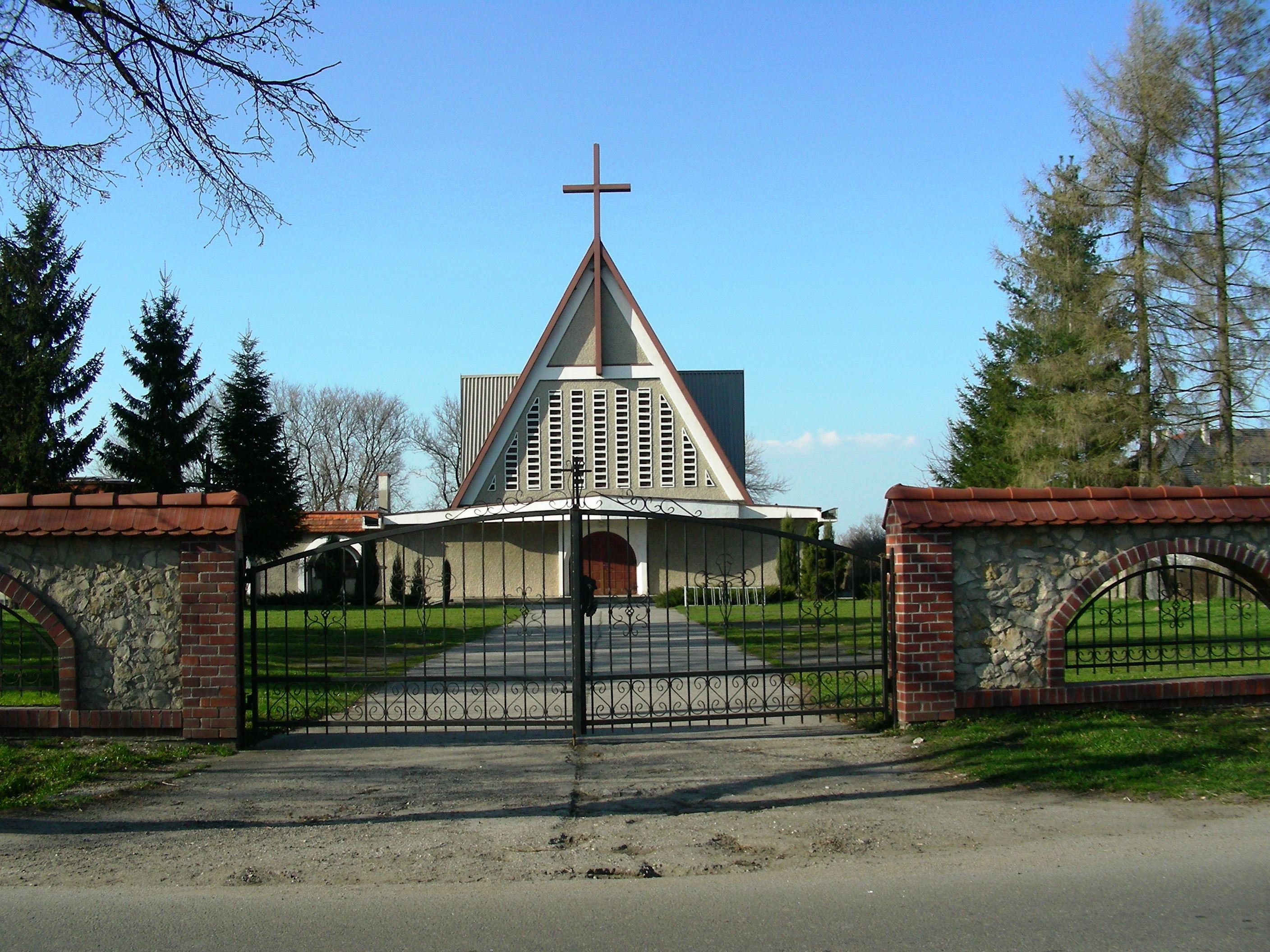
- Local Catholic church

- Location within Poland
- Coordinates: 50°42′N 17°37′E
- Country: Poland
- Voivodeship: Opole
- County: Opole
- Gmina: Niemodlin

Population
  - Total: 340
- Postal code: 49-156

Magnuszowice [maɡnuʂɔˈvit͡sɛ] (German: Gross Mangersdorf) is a village in the administrative district of Gmina Niemodlin, within Opole County, Opole Voivodeship, in south-western Poland.
