= Szydłów, Opole Voivodeship =

Szydłów
- Village
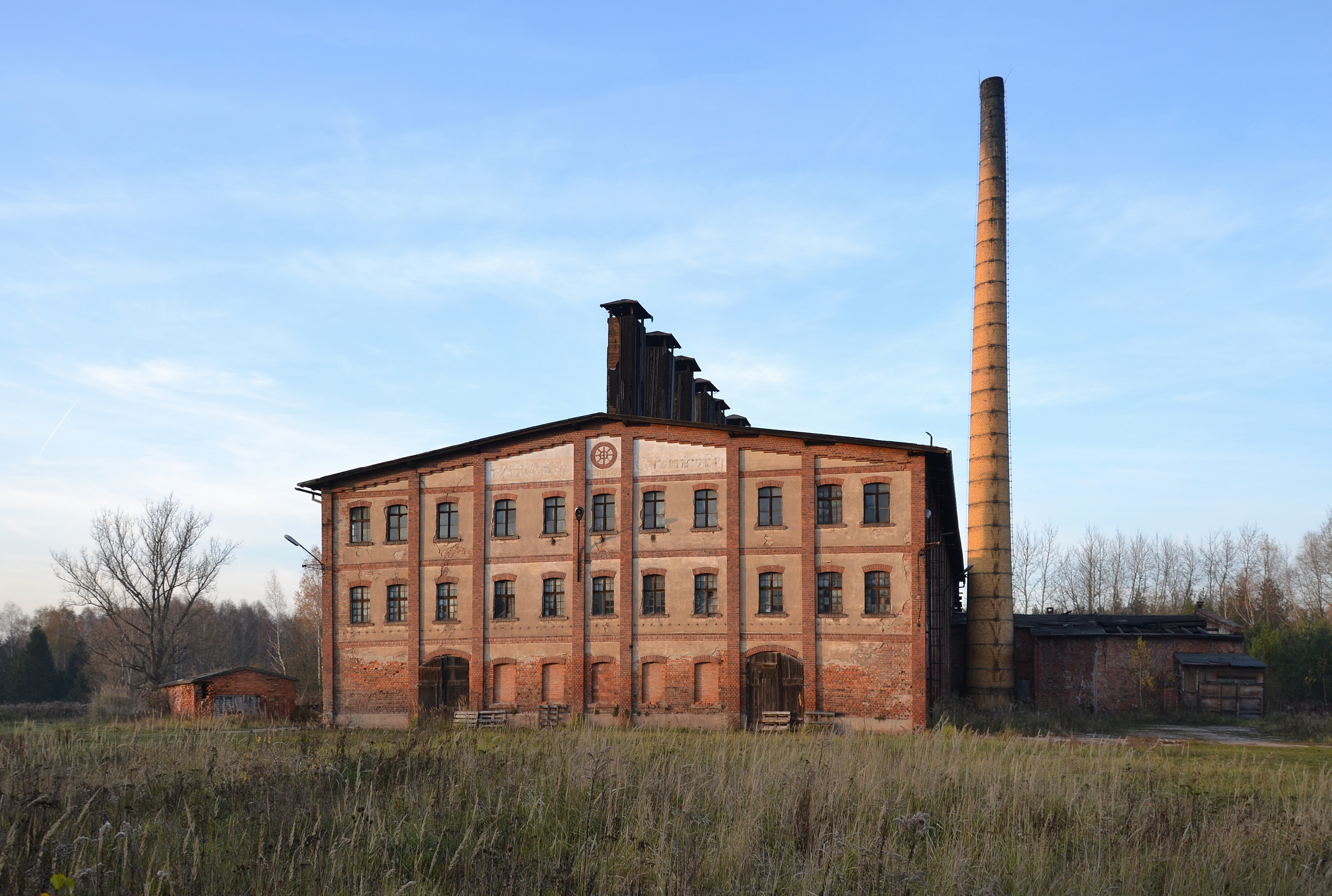
- Former roof tiles factory

- Location within Poland
- Coordinates: 50°36′N 17°43′E
- Country: Poland
- Voivodeship: Opole
- County: Opole
- Gmina: Tułowice

Population
  - Total: 500

Szydłów [ˈʂɨdwuf] (German: Schiedlow) is a village in the administrative district of Gmina Tułowice, within Opole County, Opole Voivodeship, in south-western Poland.
