= Sowin, Opole Voivodeship =

Sowin
- Village
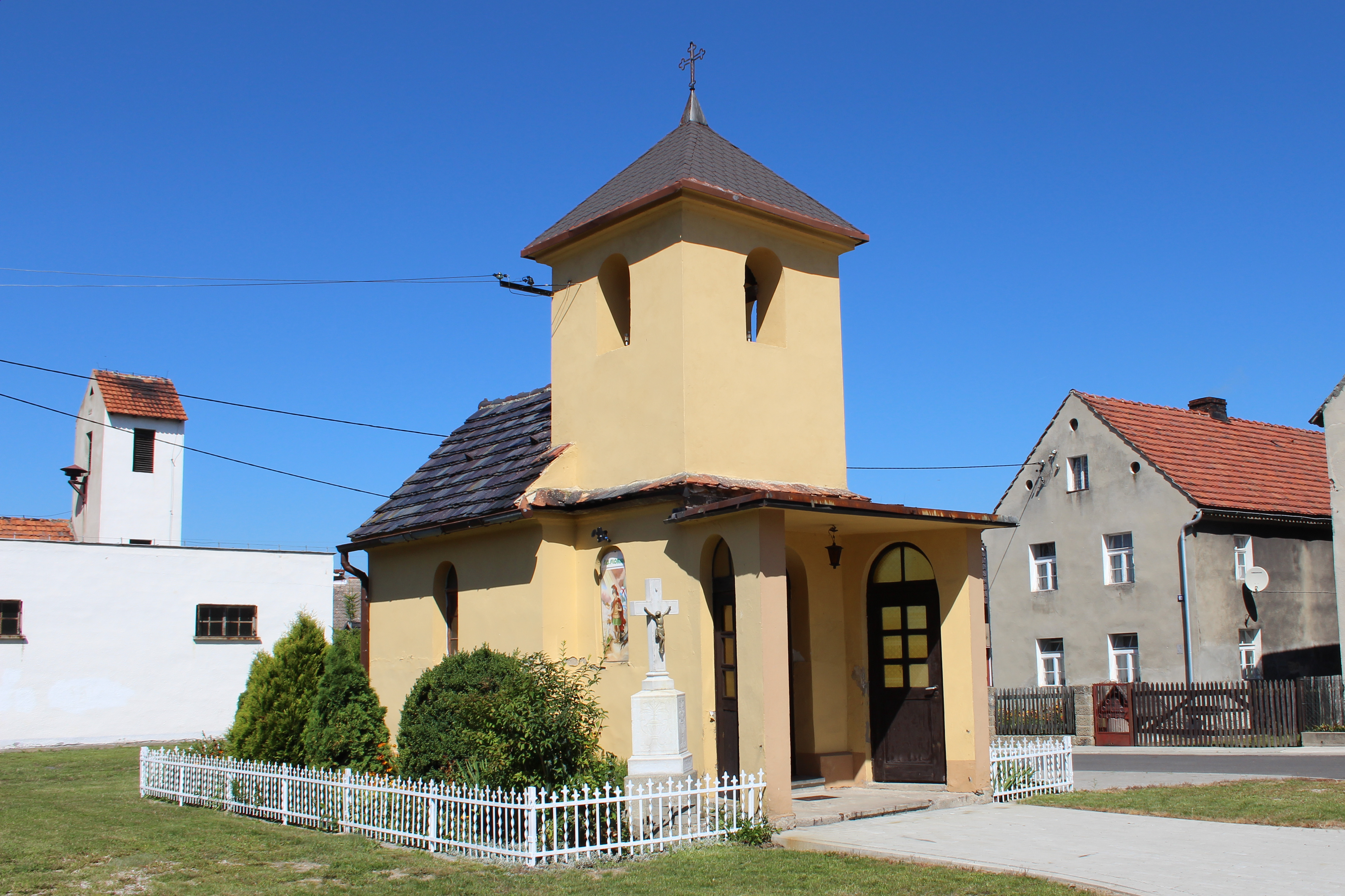
- Saint Florian chapel in Sowin

- Location within Poland
- Coordinates: 50°33′N 17°37′E
- Country: Poland
- Voivodeship: Opole
- County: Nysa
- Gmina: Łambinowice
- Population (approx.): 400
- Time zone: UTC+1 (CET)
  - Summer (DST): UTC+2 (CEST)
- Vehicle registration: ONY

Sowin [ˈsɔvin] (German: Sabine) is a village in the administrative district of Gmina Łambinowice, in Nysa County, Opole Voivodeship, in southern Poland.

== History ==
In the 10th century the area became part of the emerging Polish state, and later on, it was part of Poland, Bohemia (Czechia), Prussia, and Germany. In 1936, during a massive Nazi campaign of renaming of placenames, the village was renamed to Annahof to erase traces of Polish origin. During World War II, the German administration operated the E574 forced labour subcamp of the nearby Stalag VIII-B/344 prisoner-of-war camp at a local joinery factory. After Germany's defeat in the war, in 1945, the village became again part of Poland.

== Transport ==
There is a train station in Sowin, and the Voivodeship road 405 passes through the village.

== Notable residents ==
- Richard Thomalla (1903—1945), German Nazi SS officer and Holocaust perpetrator executed for war crimes
