= Goszczowice =

- Village
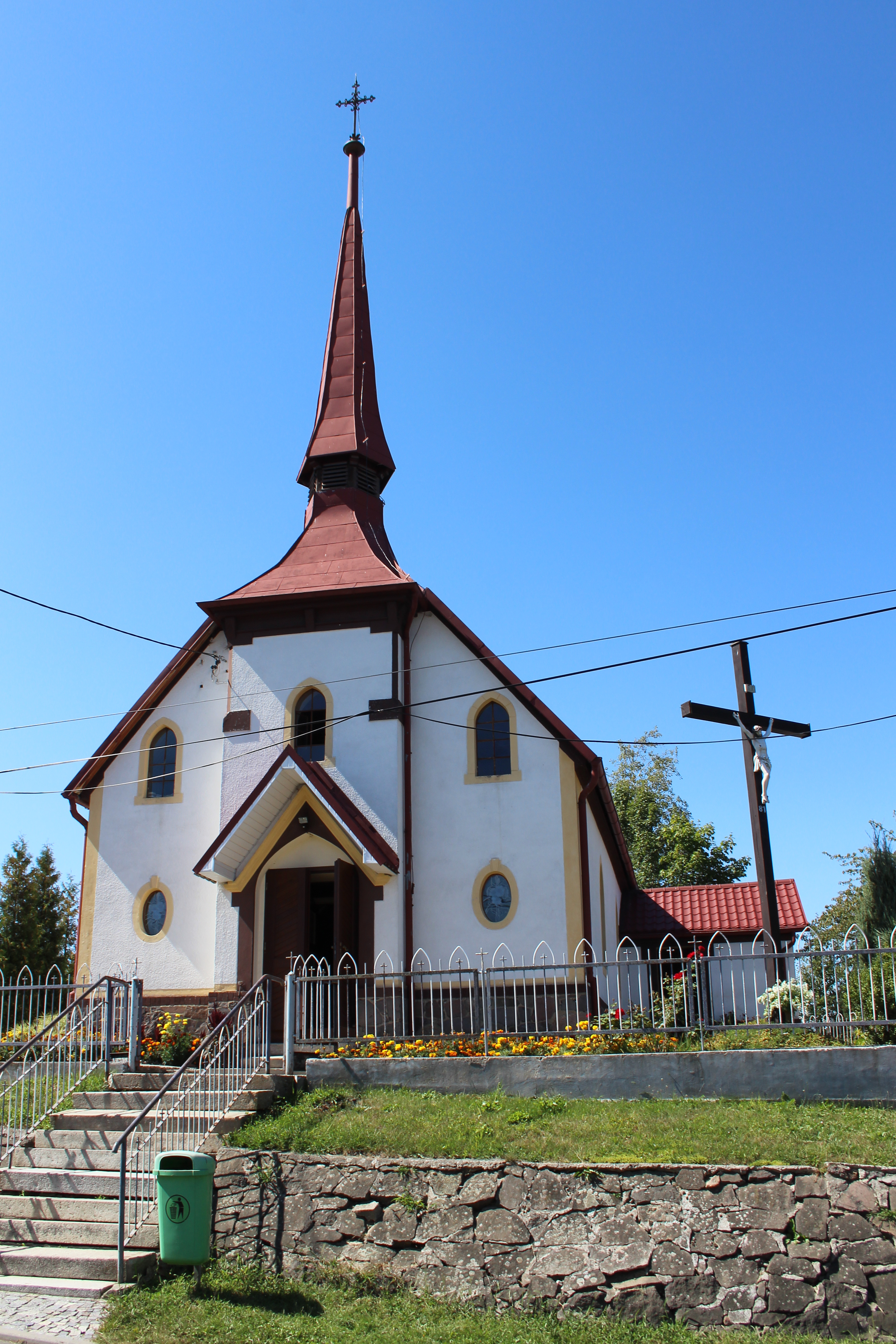
- Church of Our Lady of the Rosary

- Location within Poland
- Coordinates: 50°34′19″N 17°37′0″E
- Country: Poland
- Voivodeship: Opole
- County: Opole
- Gmina: Tułowice

Population
  - Total: 280

Goszczowice [ɡɔʂt͡ʂɔˈvit͡sɛ] (German: Guschwitz) is a village in the administrative district of Gmina Tułowice, within Opole County, Opole Voivodeship, in south-western Poland.
