= Tułowice, Opole Voivodeship =

Tułowice
- Town
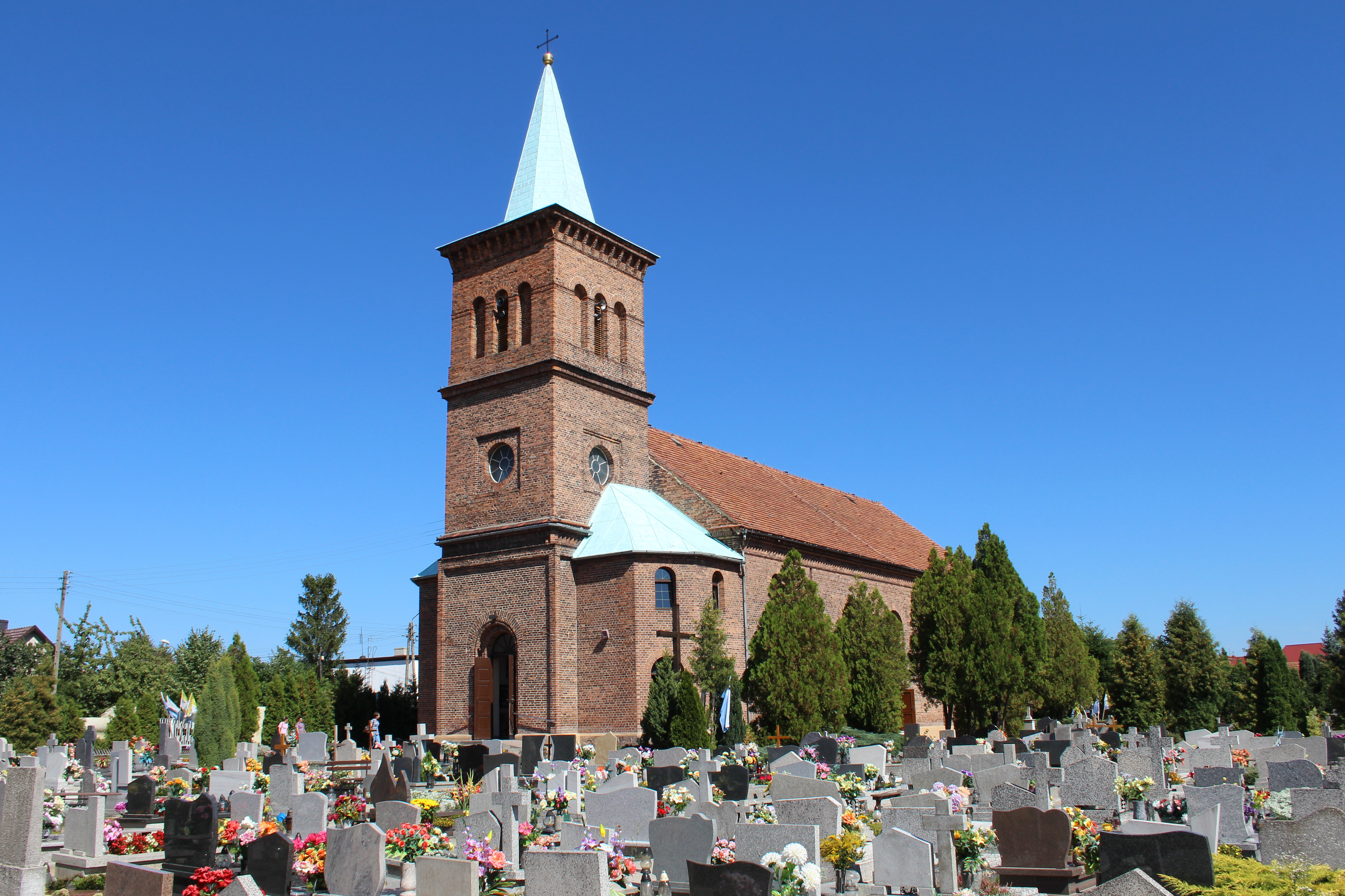
- Church of Saint Roch in Tułowice

- Coat of arms

- Location within Poland
- Coordinates: 50°35′36″N 17°39′18″E
- Country: Poland
- Voivodeship: Opole
- County: Opole
- Gmina: Tułowice
- Town rights: 2018

Area
  - Total: 9.23 km^{2} (3.56 sq mi)

Population (2019-06-30)
  - Total: 4,011
  - Density: 435/km^{2} (1,130/sq mi)
- Time zone: UTC+1 (CET)
  - Summer (DST): UTC+2 (CEST)
- Vehicle registration: OPO
- Website: http://www.tulowice.pl/

Tułowice [tuwɔˈvit͡sɛ] (German: Tillowitz) is a town in Opole County, Opole Voivodeship, in southern Poland. It is the seat of Gmina Tułowice. It is located within the historic region of Upper Silesia.

The town has a population of 4,011.

== History ==
In the Middle Ages the settlement was under Polish rule, and then it was also part of Bohemia (Czechia), Prussia and Germany. In the 19th century it was also known in Polish as Tyłowice. During World War II, the Germans established and operated the E581 forced labour subcamp of the Stalag VIII-B/344 prisoner-of-war camp in the village. In August 1944, the Stalag 367 prisoner-of-war camp was relocated from Częstochowa to Tułowice, however, it was disbanded shortly afterwards. The village was restored to Poland after the defeat of Nazi Germany in World War II in 1945. For most of its history, Tułowice was a village, before it was granted town rights in 2017, with effect from 2018.

== Transport ==
Tułowice railway station, situated on the Opole–Nysa railway serves the town.

== Notable people ==
- Oskar Kellner, German agricultural scientist

== Twin towns – sister cities ==
See twin towns of Gmina Tułowice.

== Gallery ==
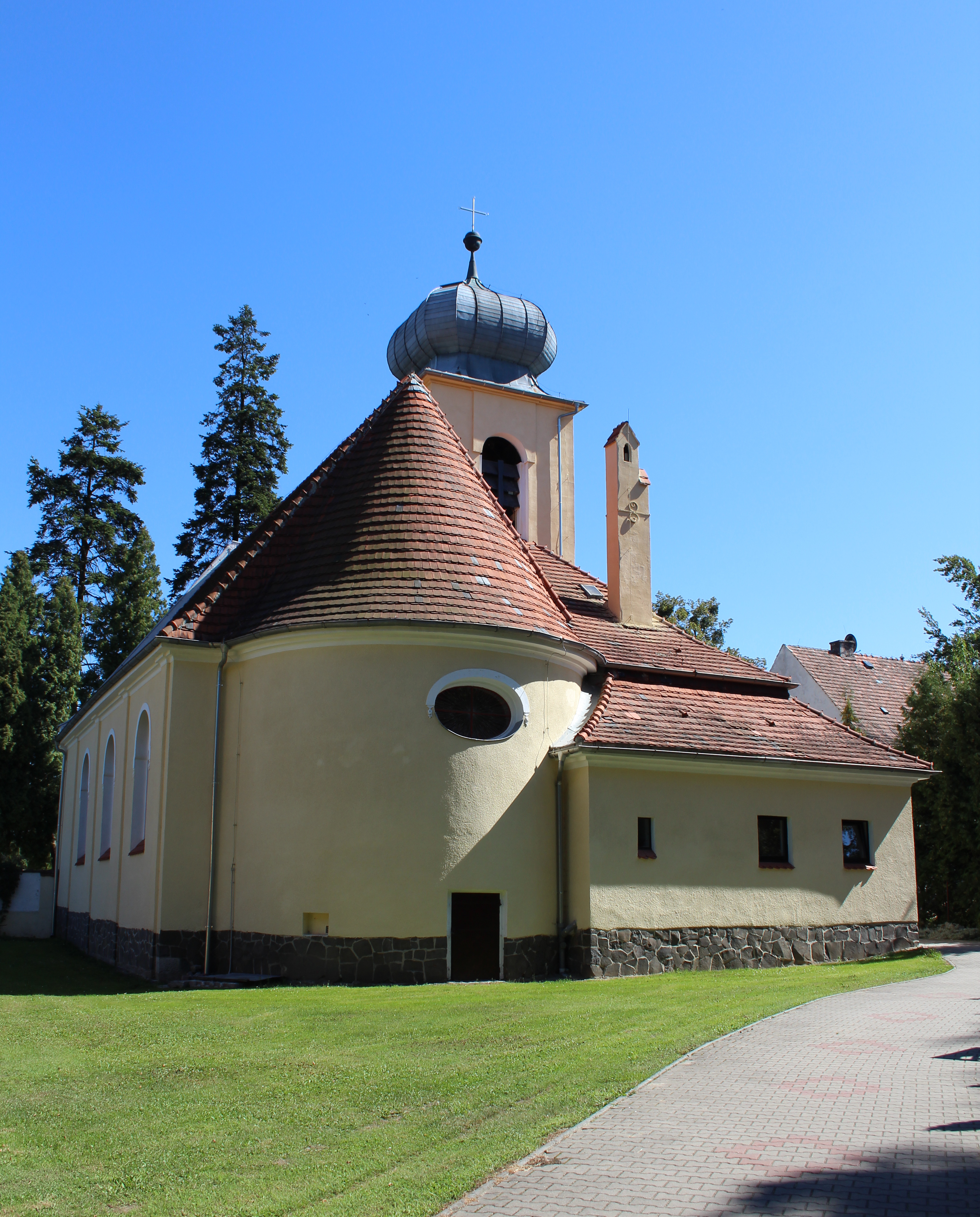
Church of the Resurrection of Christ

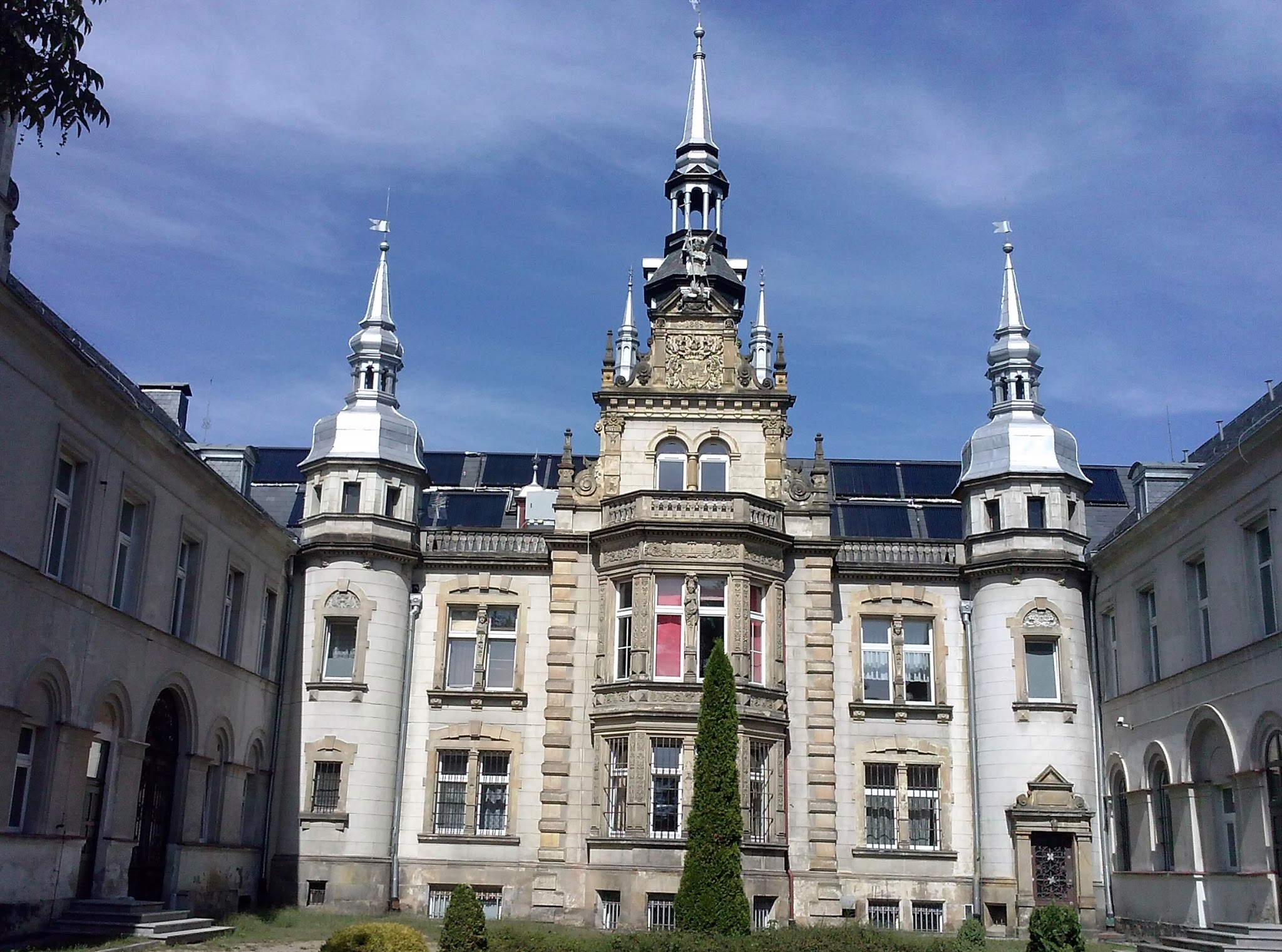
Tułowice Palace

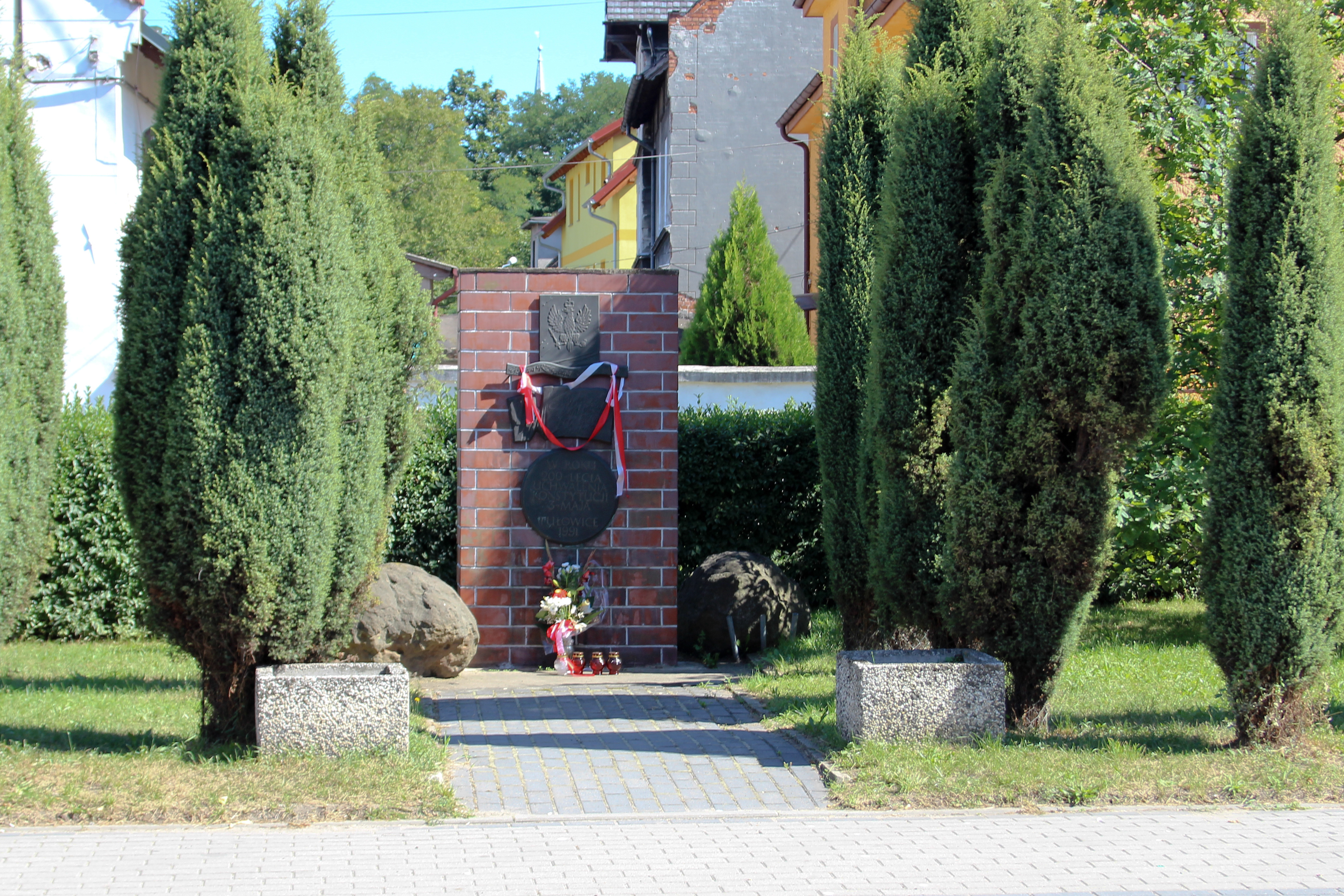
Monument commemorating the Constitution of 3 May 1791

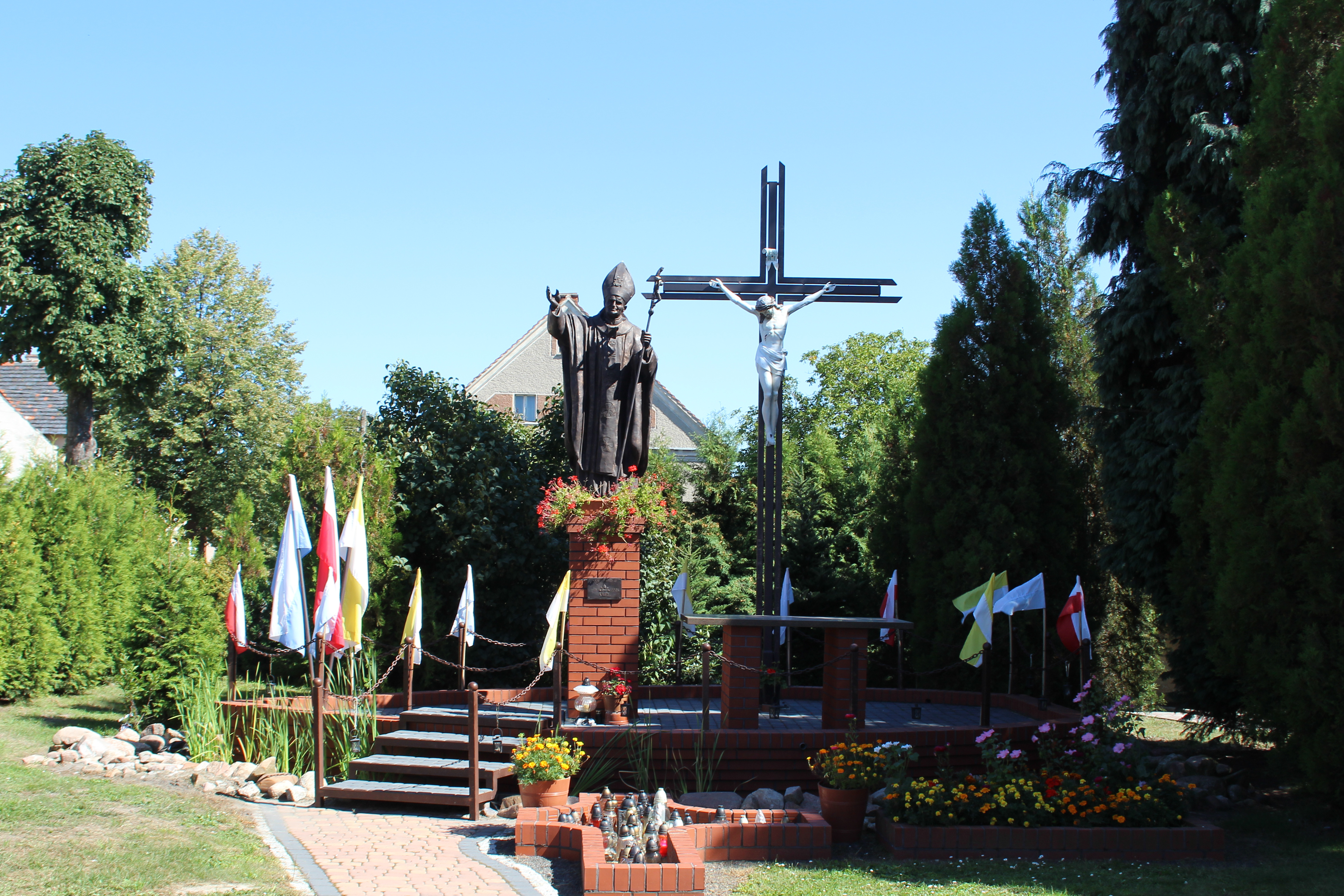
Monument of Pope John Paul II
