= Stara Jamka =

- Village
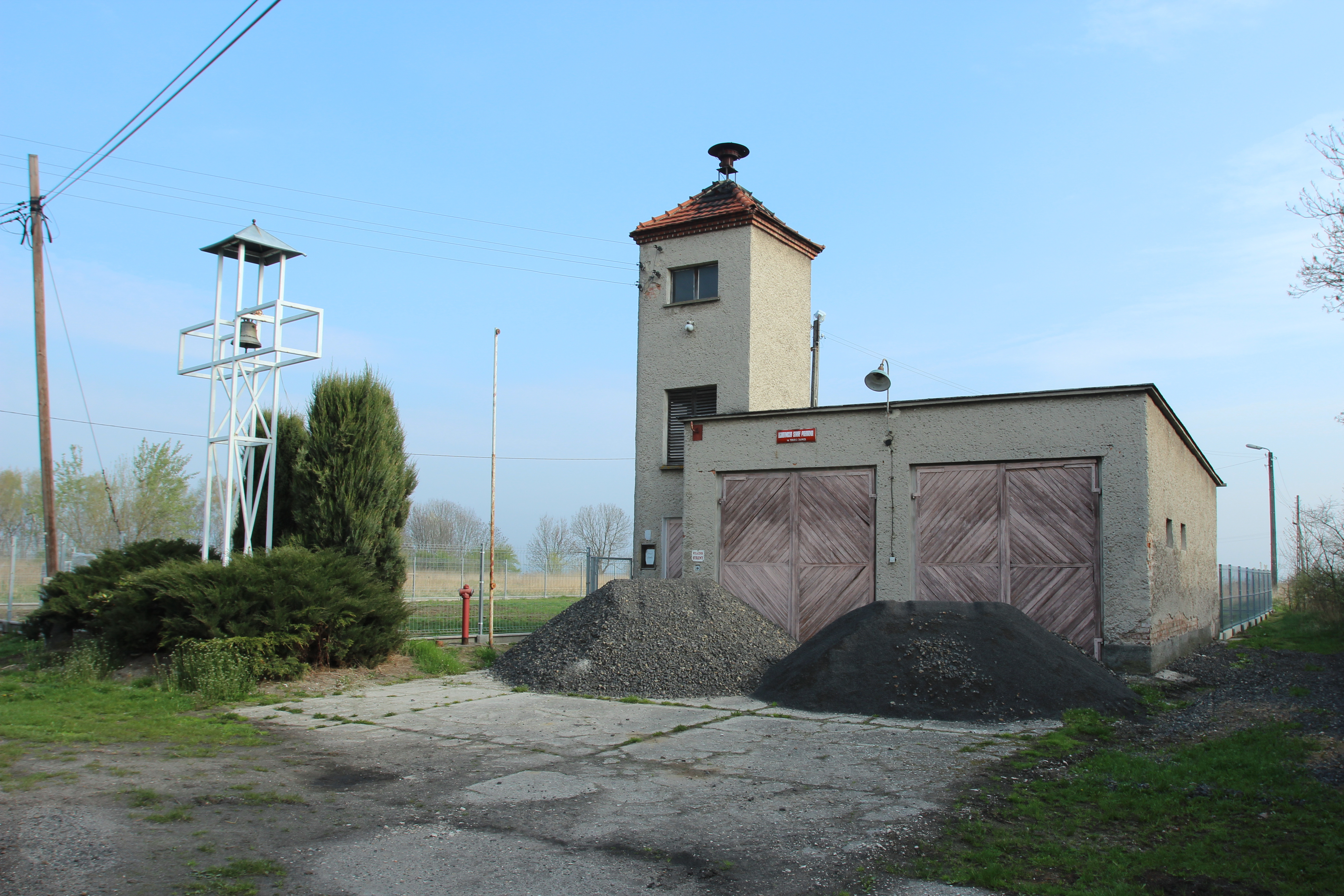
- Fire station

- Location within Poland
- Coordinates: 50°28′49″N 17°38′57″E
- Country: Poland
- Voivodeship: Opole
- County: Nysa
- Gmina: Korfantów

Stara Jamka [ˈstara ˈjamka] (German: Polnisch Jamke) is a village in the administrative district of Gmina Korfantów, within Nysa County, Opole Voivodeship, in south-western Poland.
