= Gracze =

- Village
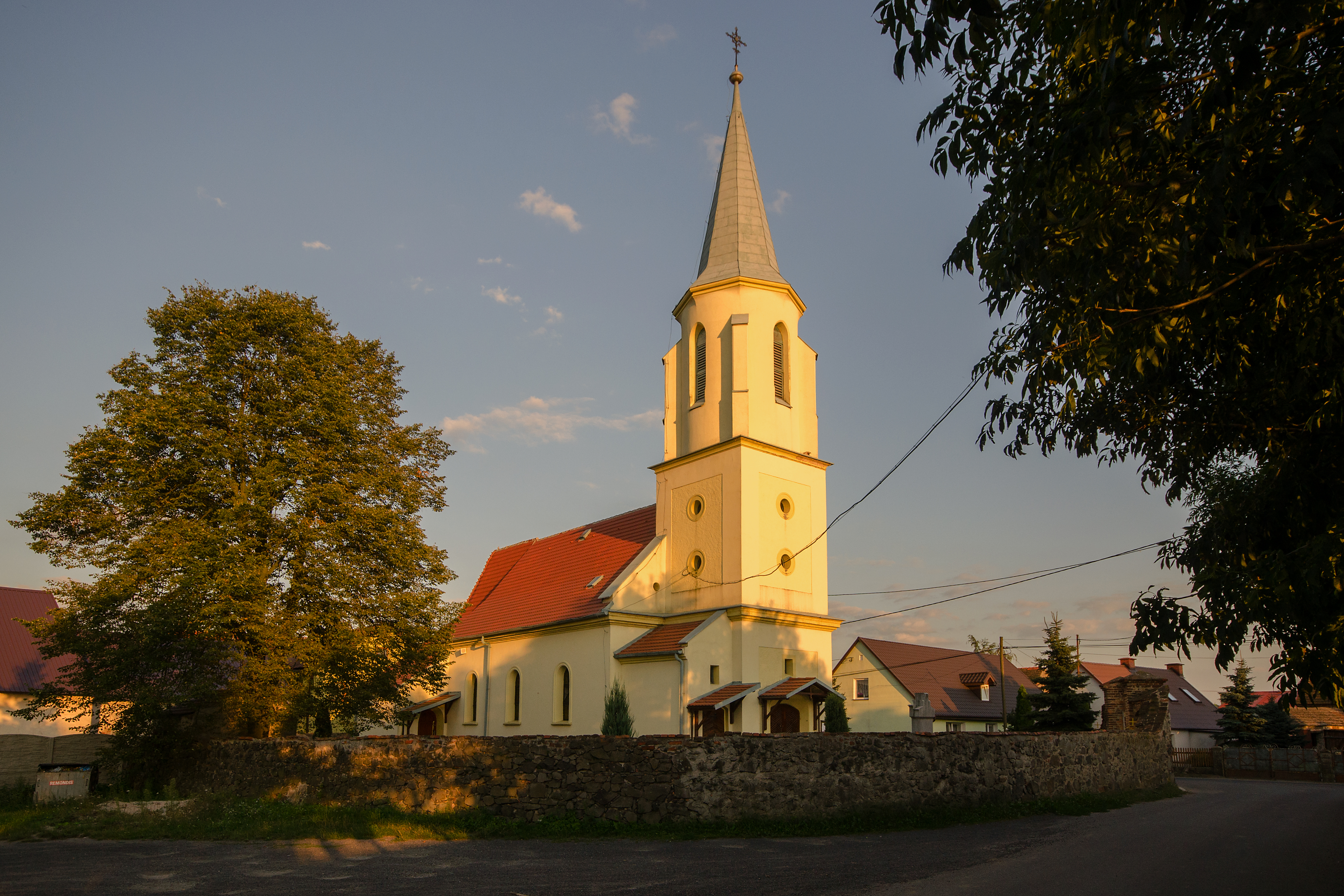
- Catholic church

- Location within Poland
- Coordinates: 50°41′48″N 17°33′0″E
- Country: Poland
- Voivodeship: Opole
- County: Opole
- Gmina: Niemodlin
- Population (approx.): 1,670

Gracze [ˈɡrat͡ʂɛ] (German: Graase) is a village in the administrative district of Gmina Niemodlin, within Opole County, Opole Voivodeship, in south-western Poland.
