= Weza =

Weza may refer to:

- Węża, a village in Poland
- Weza, South Africa
