= Gryzow =

Gryzow may refer to:

- Gryzów, Masovian Voivodeship, Poland
- Gryżów, Opole Voivodeship, Poland
