= Gmina Korfantów =

Gmina Korfantów Korfantów Commune
- Gmina
- Flag Coat of arms
- Interactive map of Gmina Korfantów
- Coordinates (Korfantów): 50°30′N 17°36′E
- Country: Poland
- Voivodeship: Opole
- County: Nysa
- Seat: Korfantów

Area
  - Total: 179.78 km^{2} (69.41 sq mi)

Population (2019-06-30)
  - Total: 8,803
  - Density: 48.97/km^{2} (126.8/sq mi)
  - Urban: 1,808
  - Rural: 6,995
- Website: http://www.korfantow.pl

Gmina Korfantów is an urban-rural gmina (administrative district) in Nysa County, Opole Voivodeship, in south-western Poland. Its seat is the town of Korfantów, which lies approximately 20 kilometres (12 mi) east of Nysa and 30 km (19 mi) south-west of the regional capital Opole.

The gmina covers an area of 179.78 square kilometres (69.4 sq mi), and as of 2019 its total population was 8,803.

== Villages ==
Apart from the town of Korfantów, Gmina Korfantów contains the villages and settlements of Borek, Gryżów, Jegielnica, Kozłówka, Kuropas, Kuźnica Ligocka, Myszowice, Niesiebędowice, Piechocice, Pleśnica, Podgórze, Przechód, Przydroże Małe, Przydroże Wielkie, Puszyna, Rączka, Rynarcice, Rzymkowice, Ścinawa Mała, Ścinawa Nyska, Stara Jamka, Stary Borek, Węża, Wielkie Łąki, Wilczury, Włodary, Włostowa.

== Neighbouring gminas ==
Gmina Korfantów is bordered by the gminas of Biała, Łambinowice, Nysa, Prószków, Prudnik and Tułowice.

== Twin towns – sister cities ==
Gmina Korfantów is twinned with:

- Boulleret, France
- Debrzno, Poland
- Friedland, Brandenburg, Germany
- Friedland, Lower Saxony, Germany
- Friedland, Mecklenburg-Vorpommern, Germany
- Frýdlant, Czech Republic
- Frýdlant nad Ostravicí, Czech Republic
- Mieroszów, Poland
- Mirosławiec, Poland
- Pravdinsk, Russia
