= Rynarcice =

Rynarcice may refer to the following places in Poland:

- Rynarcice, Lower Silesian Voivodeship (south-west Poland)
- Rynarcice, Opole Voivodeship (south-west Poland)
