= Przydroże Wielkie =

- Village
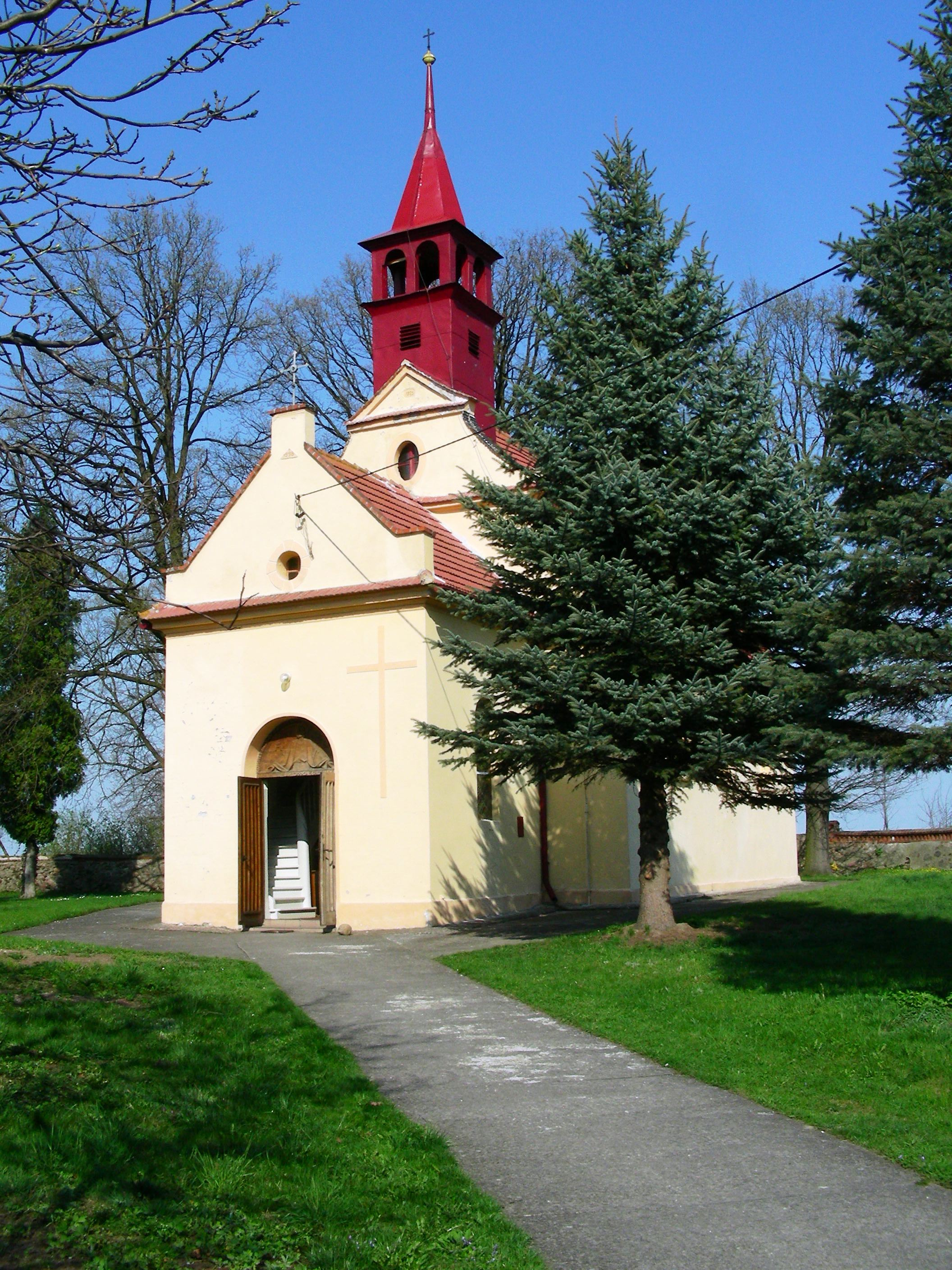
- Catholic church

- Location within Poland
- Coordinates: 50°27′N 17°35′E
- Country: Poland
- Voivodeship: Opole
- County: Nysa
- Gmina: Korfantów

Przydroże Wielkie [pʂɨˈdrɔʐɛ ˈvjɛlkʲɛ] (German: Gross Schnellendorf) is a village in the administrative district of Gmina Korfantów, within Nysa County, Opole Voivodeship, in south-western Poland.
