= Korfantów =

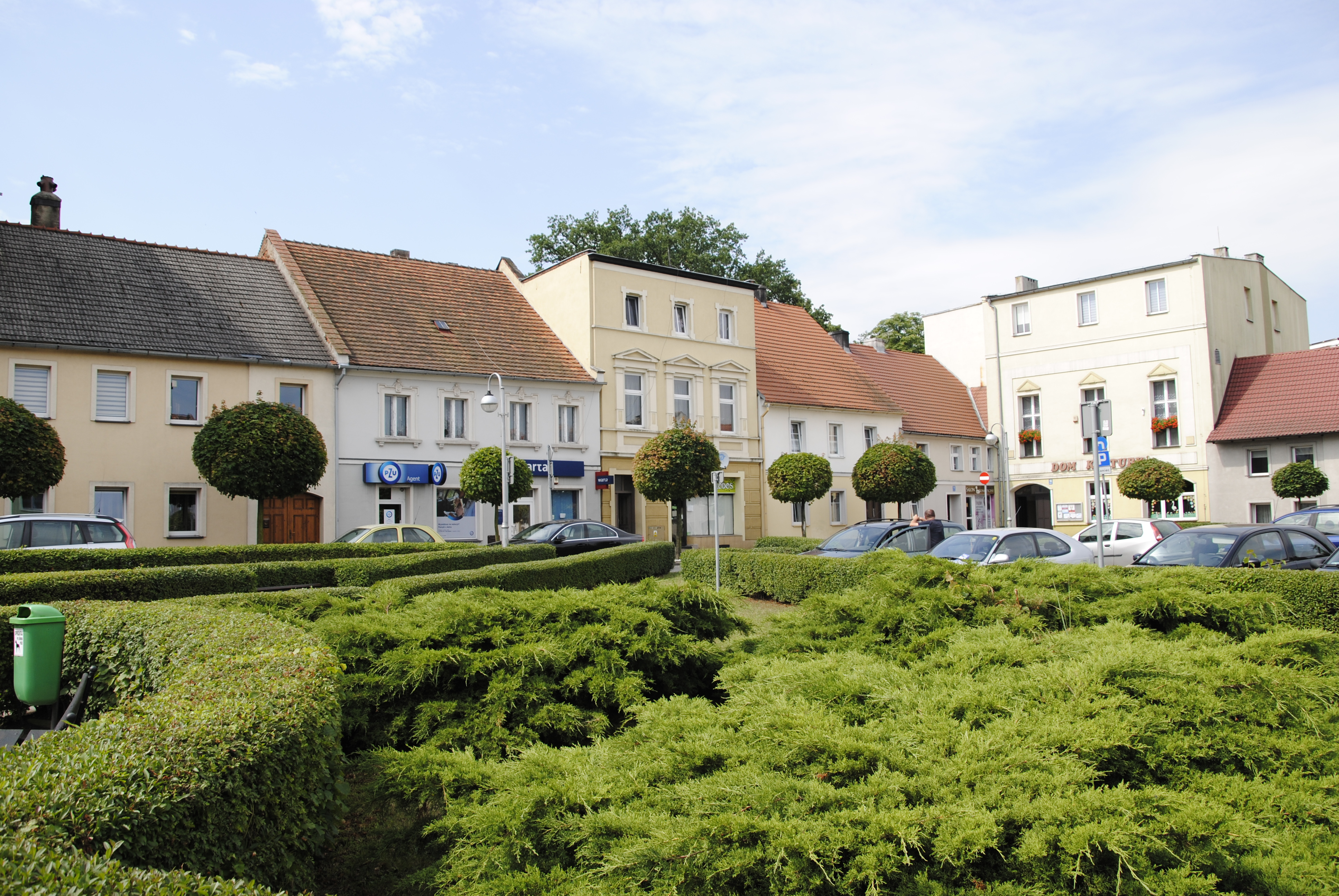
- Market Square

- Flag Coat of arms

- Location within Poland
- Coordinates: 50°30′N 17°36′E
- Country: Poland
- Voivodeship: Opole
- County: Nysa
- Gmina: Korfantów

Government
  - Mayor: Janusz Wójcik

Area
  - Total: 10.22 km^{2} (3.95 sq mi)
- Elevation: 203 m (666 ft)

Population (2019-06-30)
  - Total: 1,808
  - Density: 176.9/km^{2} (458.2/sq mi)
- Time zone: UTC+1 (CET)
  - Summer (DST): UTC+2 (CEST)
- Postal code: 48-317
- Website: Official website

Korfantów [kɔrˈfantuf] (German: Friedland in Oberschlesien, Silesian: Fyrlōnd), formerly known in Polish as Fryląd, is a town in the Opole Voivodeship of southwestern Poland, with 1,808 inhabitants (2019). In 1946 the town was renamed in honour of politician and activist Wojciech Korfanty, however, the previous name Fryląd is still in use.

== Geography ==
Korfantów is located in the Niemodlin Plain (Równina Niemodlińska), in the historical region of Silesia. The total area inside the town's boundary is 10.23 km^{2} (3.95 sq mi).

== Etymology ==
The former name of the settlement was Hurtlanth or Hurthland. Other documents refer to the town as: Fredland, Fredelant, Fredlandt, Fridland, Freijland, and Friedland. The locality's Polish name was based on the German name, and had various forms: Ferląd, Ferlondt, Frydląd, Fyrląd, and Fryląd, officially adopted in 1945. In 1946, in the aftermath of World War II, due to the German origin of the name, the town was renamed after Wojciech Korfanty.

== History ==
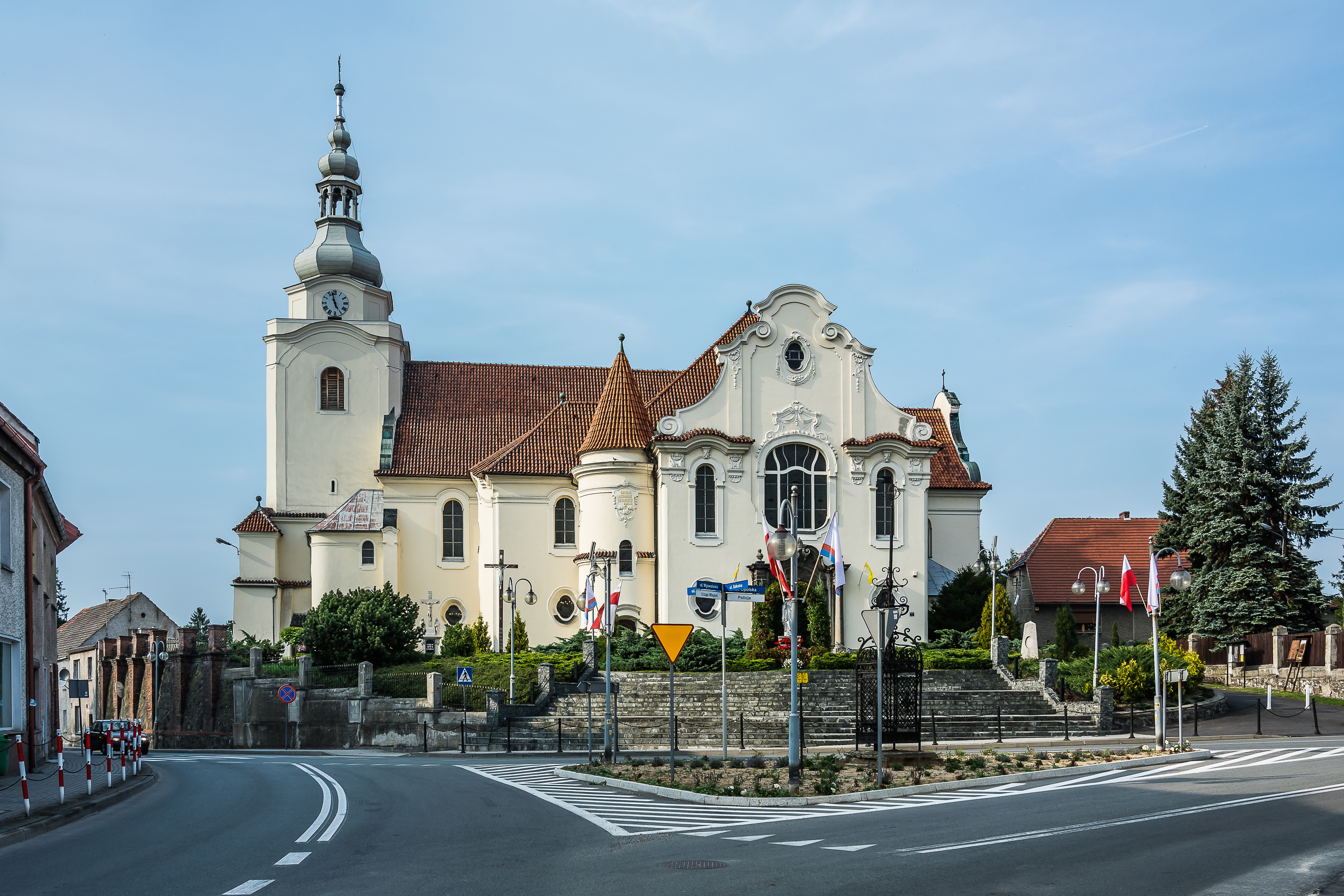
Holy Trinity church

Until 1532 the area was in the possession of Polish princes of the Silesian Piast Dynasty. Simultaneously, an influx of German settlers caused the town to develop; it became the property of wealthy German and Silesian nobles. In 1632, the Swedes plundered Friedland and surrounding villages during the Thirty Years' War. Over the next decades the town also suffered due to plagues and fires. At that time, Friedland was part of the Kingdom of Bohemia within the Habsburg monarchy. In 1645 it returned to Poland under the House of Vasa, and in 1666 it fell to Bohemia again, however, it was ceded to Prussia after Frederick II the Great emerged victorious in the mid-18th century Silesian Wars. In the 19th century, despite Prussian and German rule, Catholic services were still held in Polish alongside German. It was part of Germany from 1871 until the end of World War II in 1945, when, under the Potsdam Agreement, it was reassigned to Poland. During World War II, the Polenlager 85 Nazi German concentration camp for Poles was based in the town in 1942–1943. A mass grave of its prisoners is located at the local parish cemetery.

== Economy ==
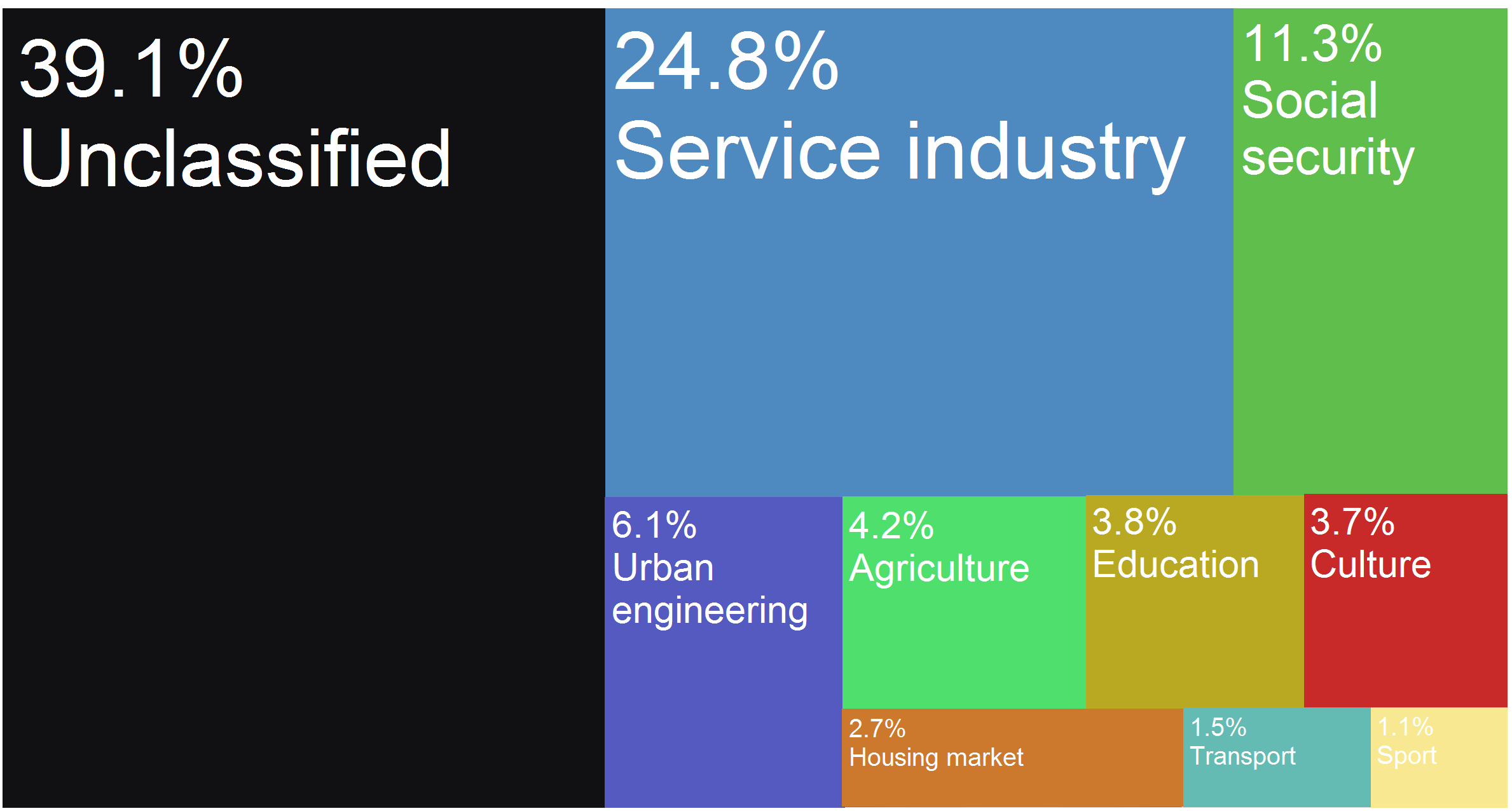
Korfantów city budget income sources as of 2015

In the interwar period, there were 152 registered businesses in Korfantów, namely in the services, trade and food production sectors. After World War II, the town lost its former importance as the agricultural centre in the Nysa County. This was largely the effect of war losses, requisitioning, plunder and the Red Army's war commissar's rule over the locality in 1945, as well as poor political decisions. Later, the regime of the Polish People's Republic caused much impoverishment and financial instability, therefore, it was not until the reintroduction of the free market in 1989 that economic growth began to return. As of 2015, 52% of the Gmina Korfantów populace lives off the agricultural sector.

== Notable people ==
- Carl Friedrich von Pückler-Burghauss (1886–1945), Waffen SS General
- Maria Kornek (born 1960), Polish Olympic field hockey player
- Lucyna Siejka (born 1962), Polish Olympic field hockey player

== Twin towns – sister cities ==
See twin towns of Gmina Korfantów.
