= Wielkie Łąki =

- Village
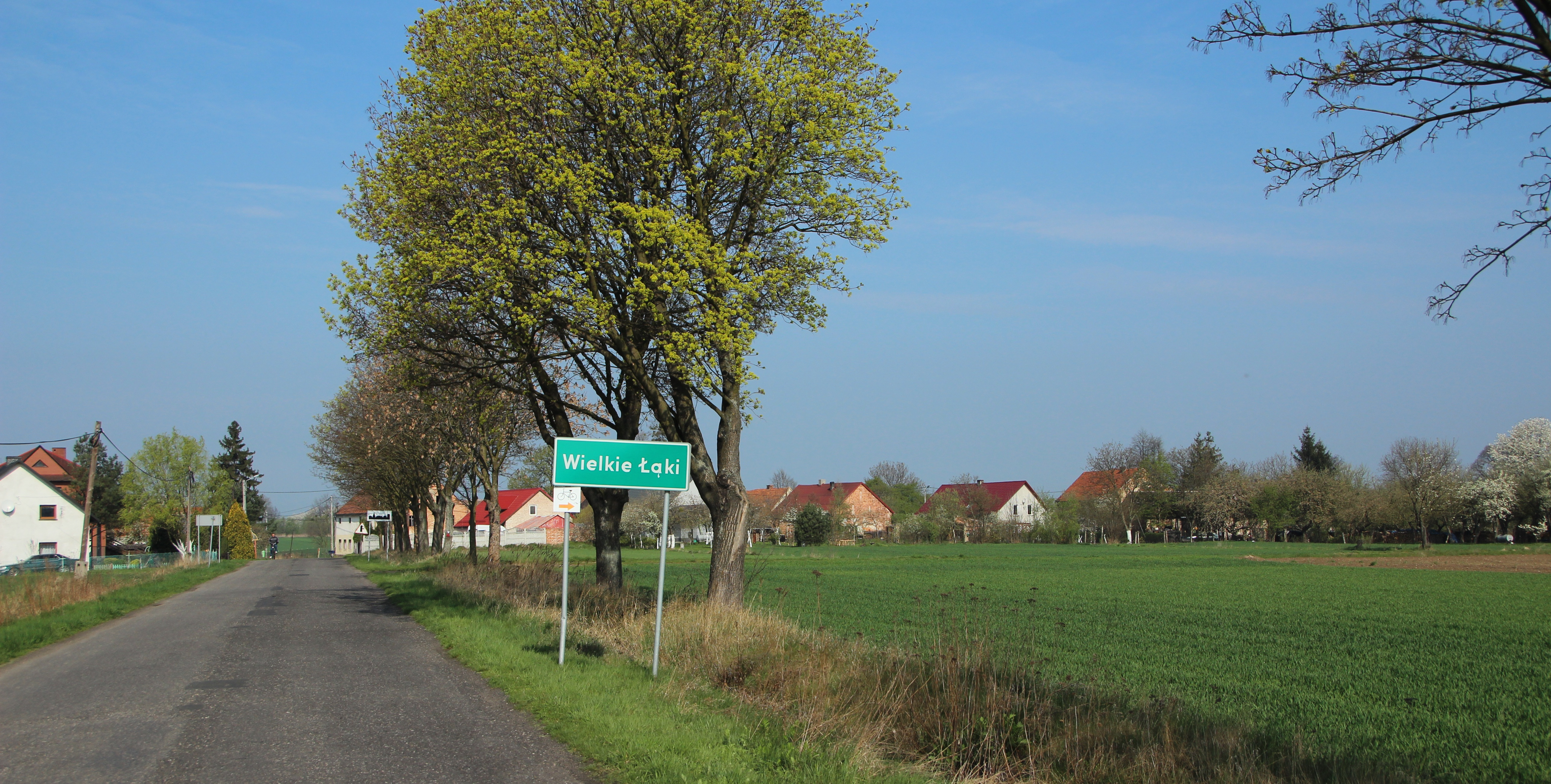

- Location within Poland
- Coordinates: 50°29′43″N 17°34′22″E
- Country: Poland
- Voivodeship: Opole
- County: Nysa
- Gmina: Korfantów
- Time zone: UTC+1 (CET)
  - Summer (DST): UTC+2 (CEST)
- Vehicle registration: ONY

Wielkie Łąki (Polish pronunciation: [ˈvjɛlkʲɛ ˈwɔŋkʲi], German: Hillersdorf) is a village in the administrative district of Gmina Korfantów, within Nysa County, Opole Voivodeship, in south-western Poland.

The name of the village in Polish means great meadows. The historic German place name developed from the name Hildebrandt.
