= Florian Essenfelder =

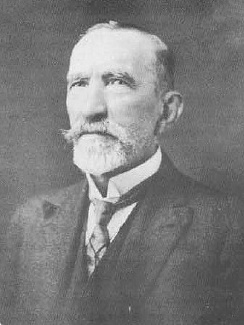
- Born: 7 November 1855
- Died: 19 January 1929 (aged 73)

Florian Essenfelder (Germany, 7 November 1855 – Brazil, 19 January 1929) made pianos in Germany and Brazil. He was the founder of the piano company Essenfelder.

Son of Ferdinard Essenfelder and Maria Jacomowski Essenfelder, he was born in Friedland, East Prussia, Germany, since renamed Pravdinsk, Kaliningrad Oblast.

At the age of 27, he started making pianos for the German piano company C. Bechstein.

In 1889, he moved with his wife, Maria Jacomowski, and their sons to Buenos Aires, Argentina where he founded his first piano factory. In 1907 he moved to Curitiba, Brazil, where he founded the F. Essenfelder, one of the biggest piano companies internationally, in terms of quality during the early twentieth century. Most of the Curitiba are Essenfelders.
