= Przydroże Małe =

- Village
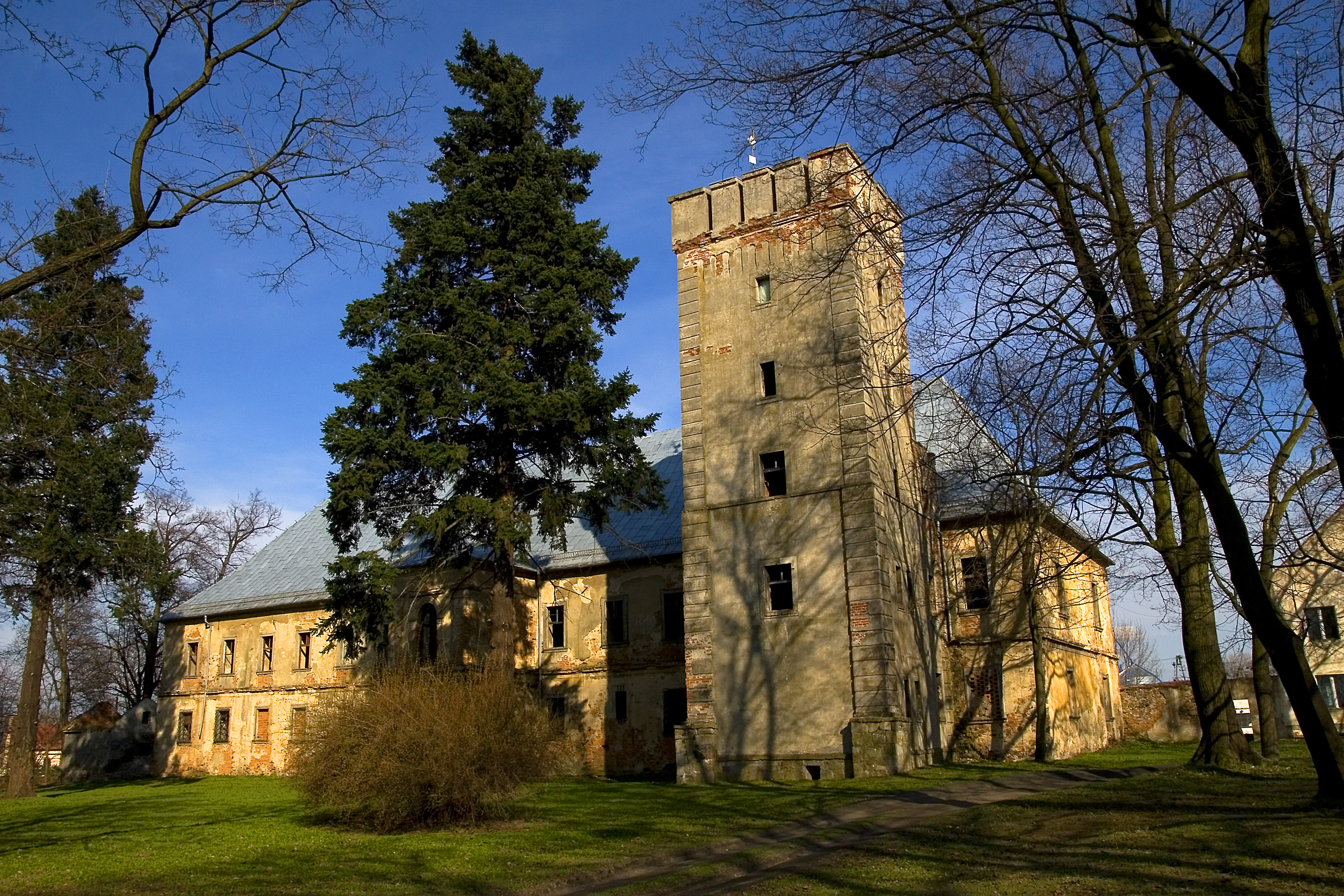
- Palace

- Location within Poland
- Coordinates: 50°26′N 17°34′E
- Country: Poland
- Voivodeship: Opole
- County: Nysa
- Gmina: Korfantów

Przydroże Małe [pʂɨˈdrɔʐɛ ˈmawɛ] (German: Klein Schnellendorf) is a village in the administrative district of Gmina Korfantów, within Nysa County, Opole Voivodeship, in south-western Poland.
