= Rączka =

- Village
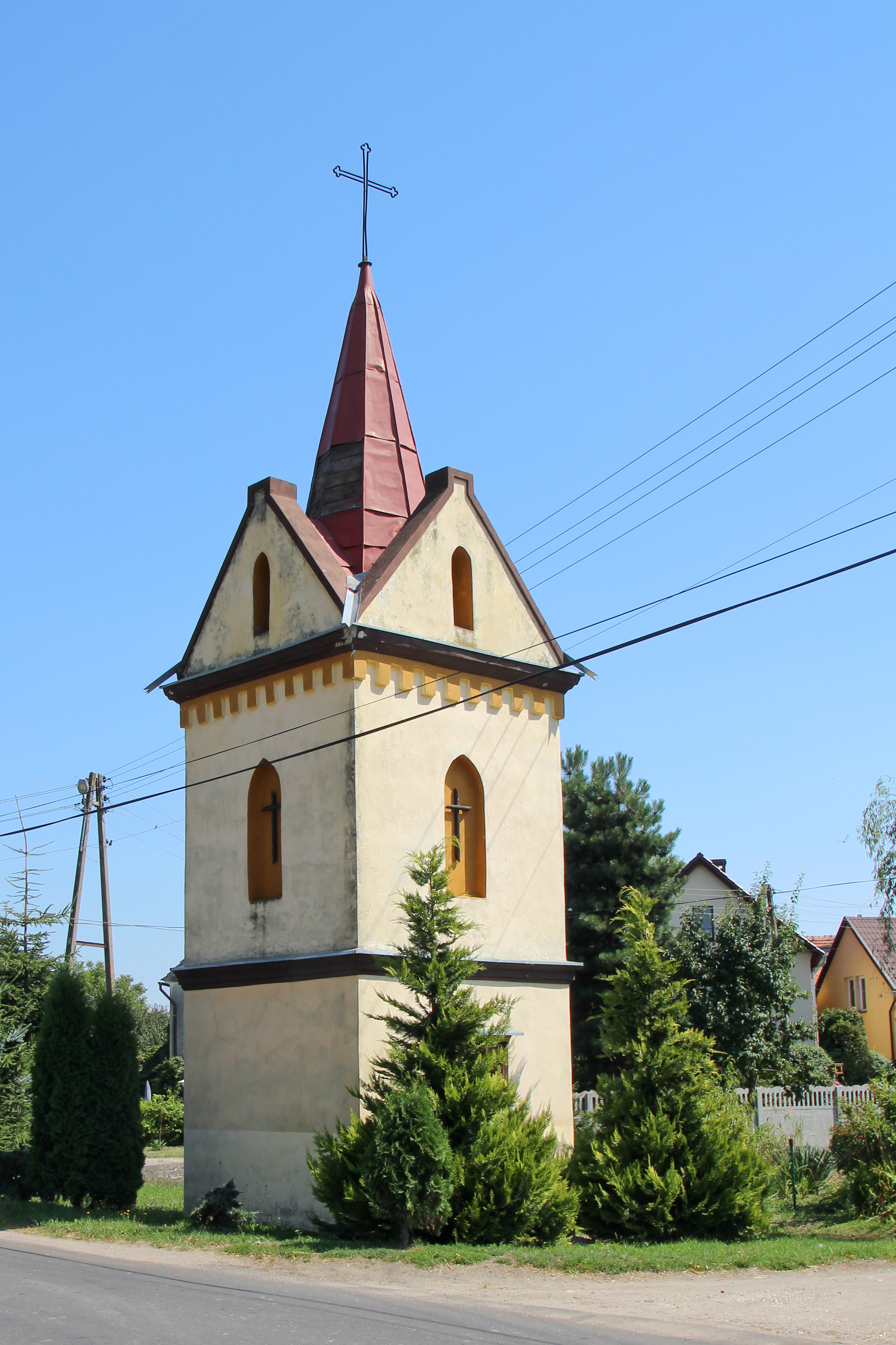
- Chapel

- Location within Poland
- Coordinates: 50°28′39″N 17°35′19″E
- Country: Poland
- Voivodeship: Opole
- County: Nysa
- Gmina: Korfantów

Rączka [ˈrɔnt͡ʂka] (German: Ranisch) is a village in the administrative district of Gmina Korfantów, within Nysa County, Opole Voivodeship, in south-western Poland.
