= Stary Borek, Opole Voivodeship =

Stary Borek
- Village
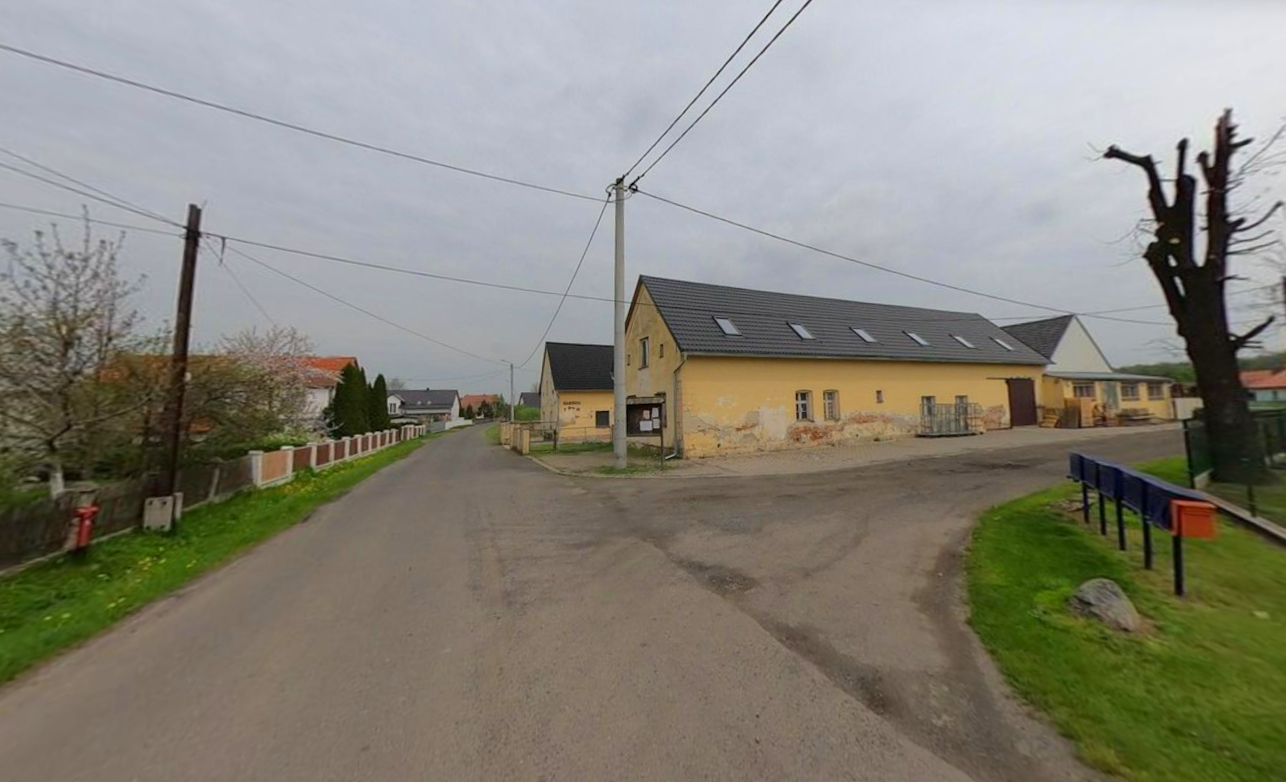

- Location within Poland
- Coordinates: 50°31′17″N 17°40′10″E
- Country: Poland
- Voivodeship: Opole
- County: Nysa
- Gmina: Korfantów
- Time zone: UTC+1 (CET)
  - Summer (DST): UTC+2
- Area code: +4877
- Vehicle registration: ONY

Stary Borek is a village in the administrative district of Gmina Korfantów, within Nysa County, Opole Voivodeship, south-western Poland.
