= Kuźnica Ligocka =

- Village
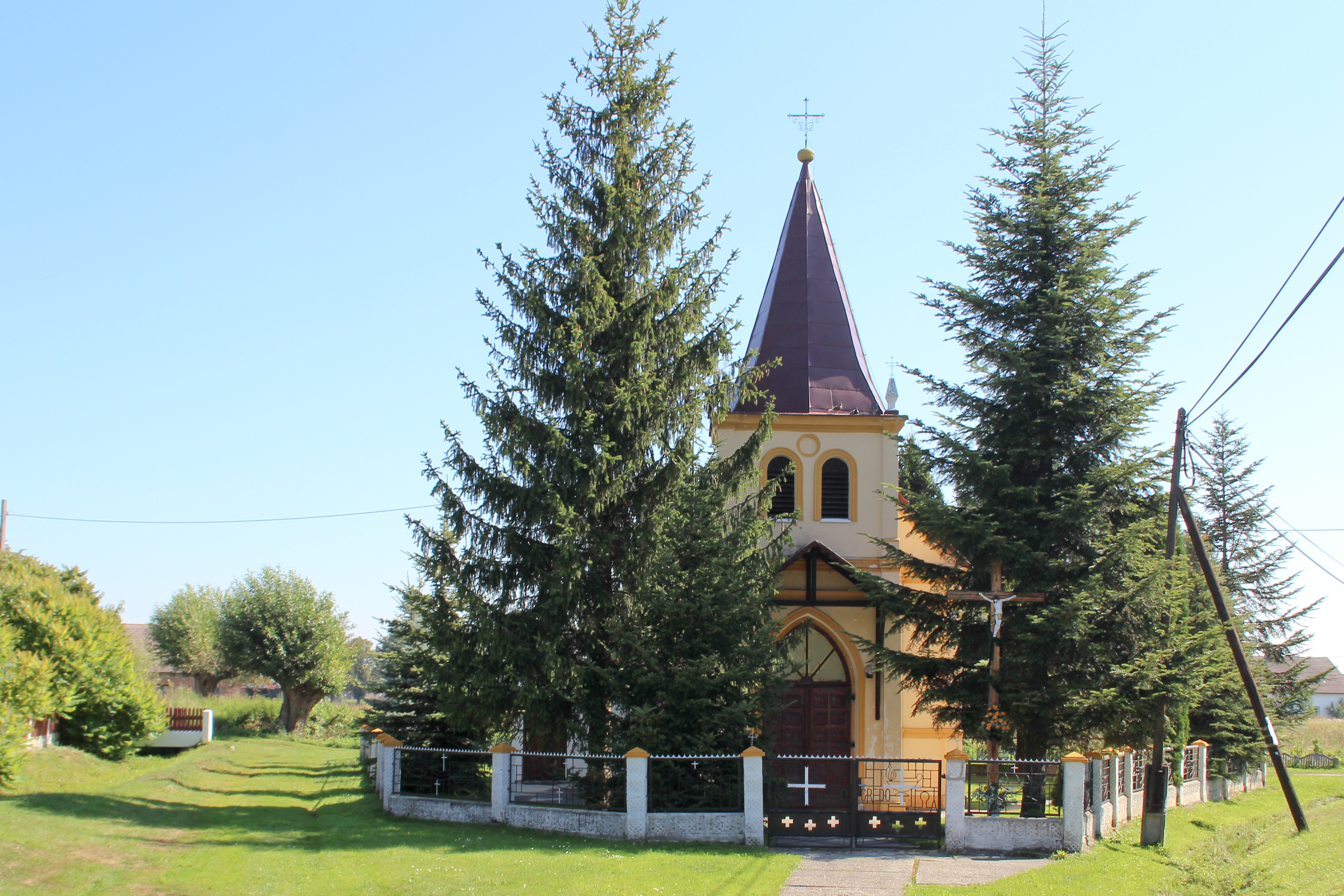

- Location within Poland
- Coordinates: 50°31′N 17°40′E
- Country: Poland
- Voivodeship: Opole
- County: Nysa
- Gmina: Korfantów
- Elevation: 179 m (587 ft)
- Population: 437

Kuźnica Ligocka (Polish pronunciation: [kuʑˈɲit͡sa liˈɡɔt͡ska], German: Ellguth Hammer) is a village in the administrative district of Gmina Korfantów, within Nysa County, Opole Voivodeship, in south-western Poland.
