= Włodary =

- Village
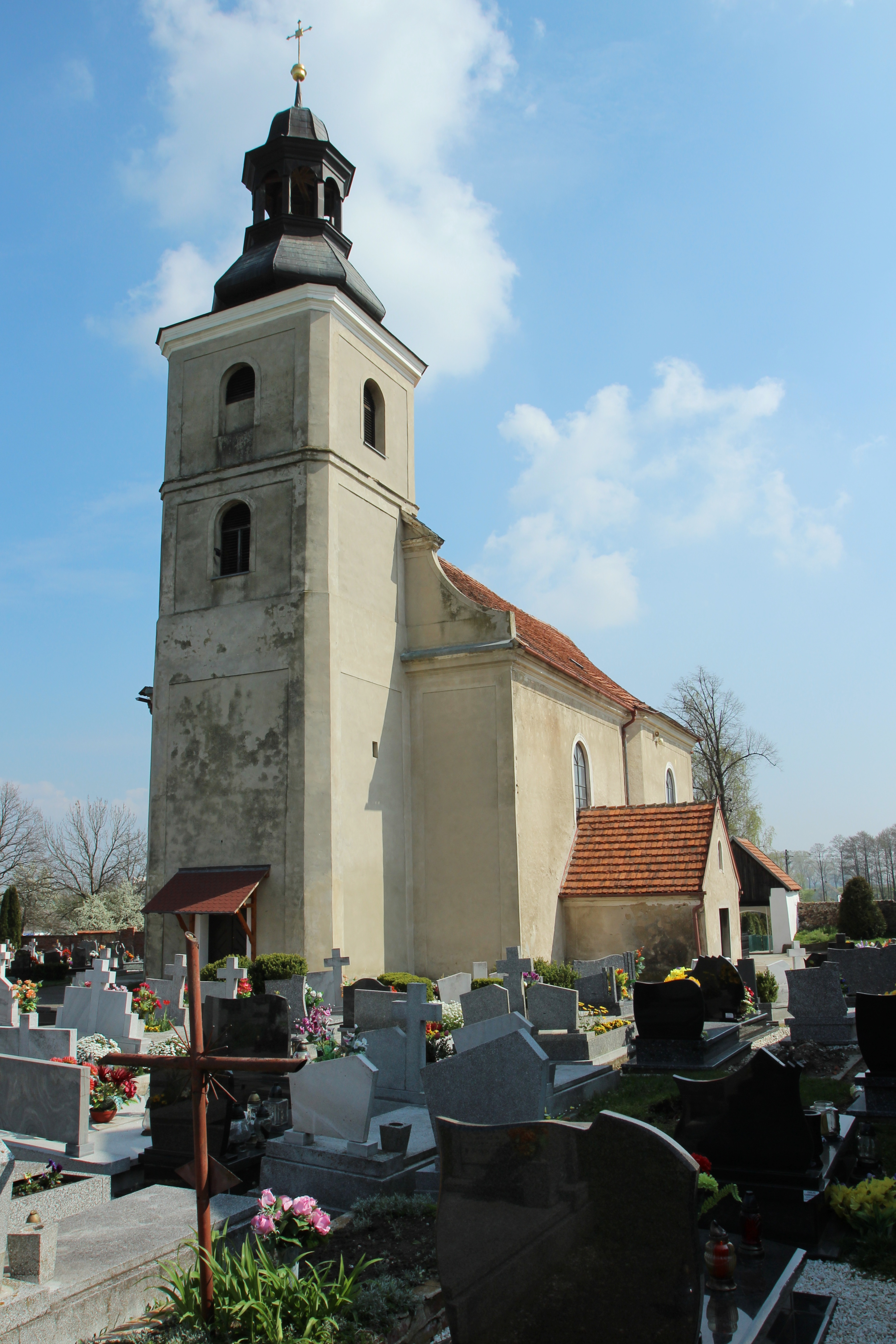

- Location within Poland
- Coordinates: 50°28′N 17°30′E
- Country: Poland
- Voivodeship: Opole
- County: Nysa
- Gmina: Korfantów

Włodary [vwɔˈdarɨ] (German: Volkmannsdorf) is a village in the administrative district of Gmina Korfantów, within Nysa County, Opole Voivodeship (1975-1998), in south-western Poland.
