= Borek, Nysa County =

Borek
- Village
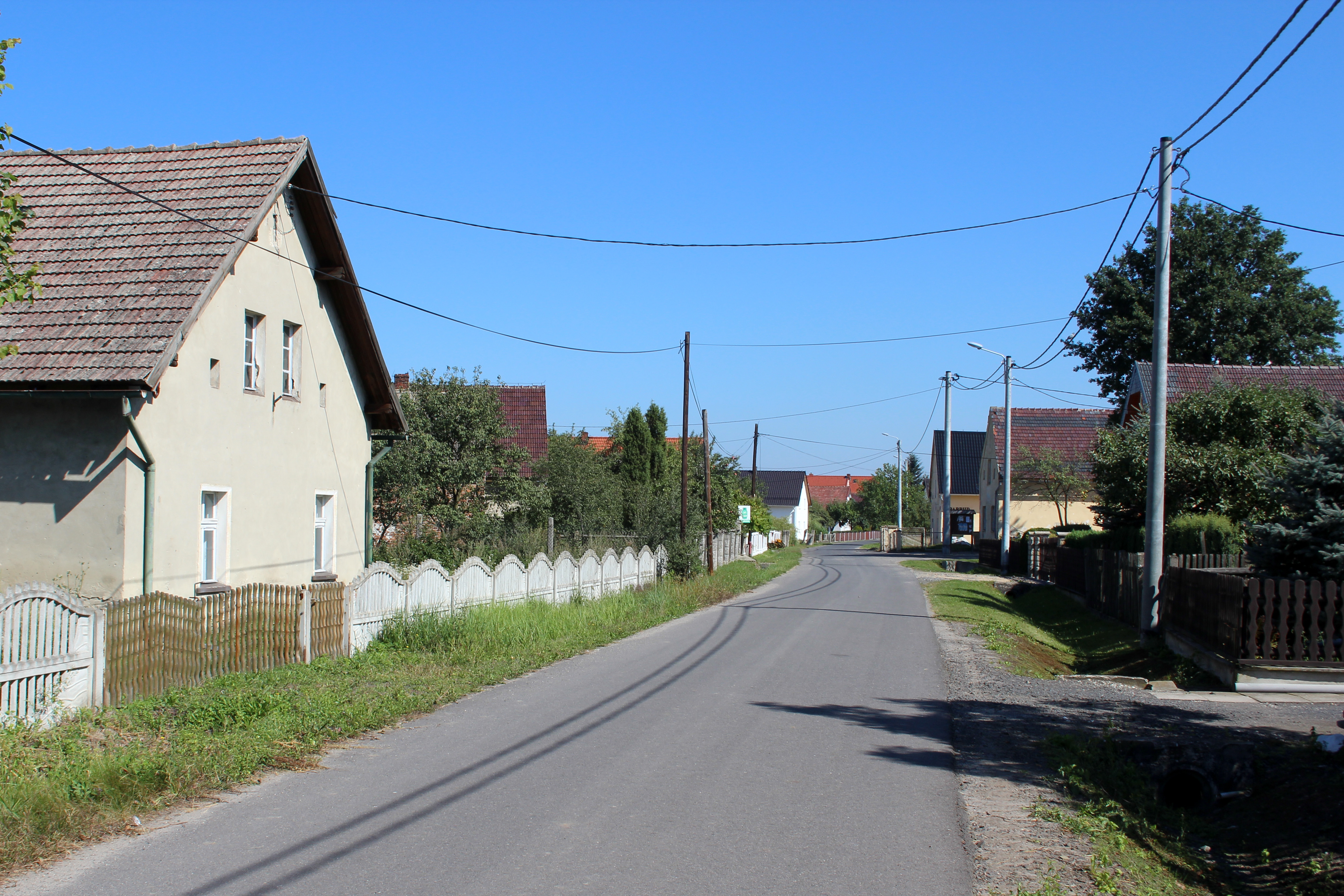

- Location within Poland
- Coordinates: 50°31′16″N 17°40′11″E
- Country: Poland
- Voivodeship: Opole
- County: Nysa
- Gmina: Korfantów
- Population: 223

Borek [ˈbɔrɛk] (German: Leopoldsdorf) is a village in the administrative district of Gmina Korfantów, within Nysa County, Opole Voivodeship, in south-western Poland.

== See also ==
- Prudnik Land
