= Rzymkowice =

- Village
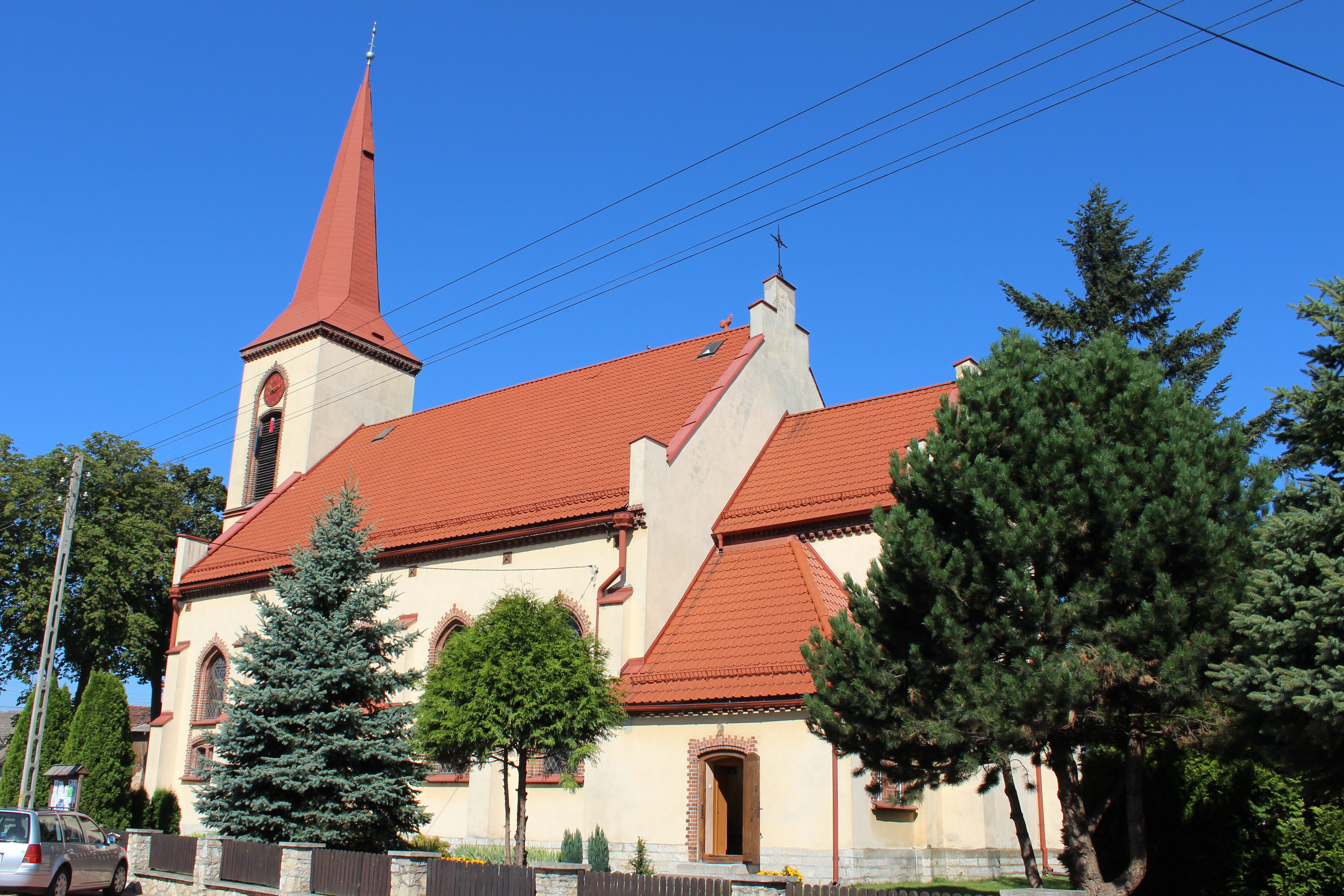
- Church

- Location within Poland
- Coordinates: 50°30′N 17°40′E
- Country: Poland
- Voivodeship: Opole
- County: Nysa
- Gmina: Korfantów
- Website: http://www.rzymkowice.eu

Rzymkowice [ʐɨmkɔˈvit͡sɛ] (German: Ringwitz) is a village in the administrative district of Gmina Korfantów, within Nysa County, Opole Voivodeship, in south-western Poland.

== See also ==
- Prudnik Land
