= Pravdinsk =

Town in Kaliningrad Oblast, Russia

Pravdinsk Правдинск
- Town
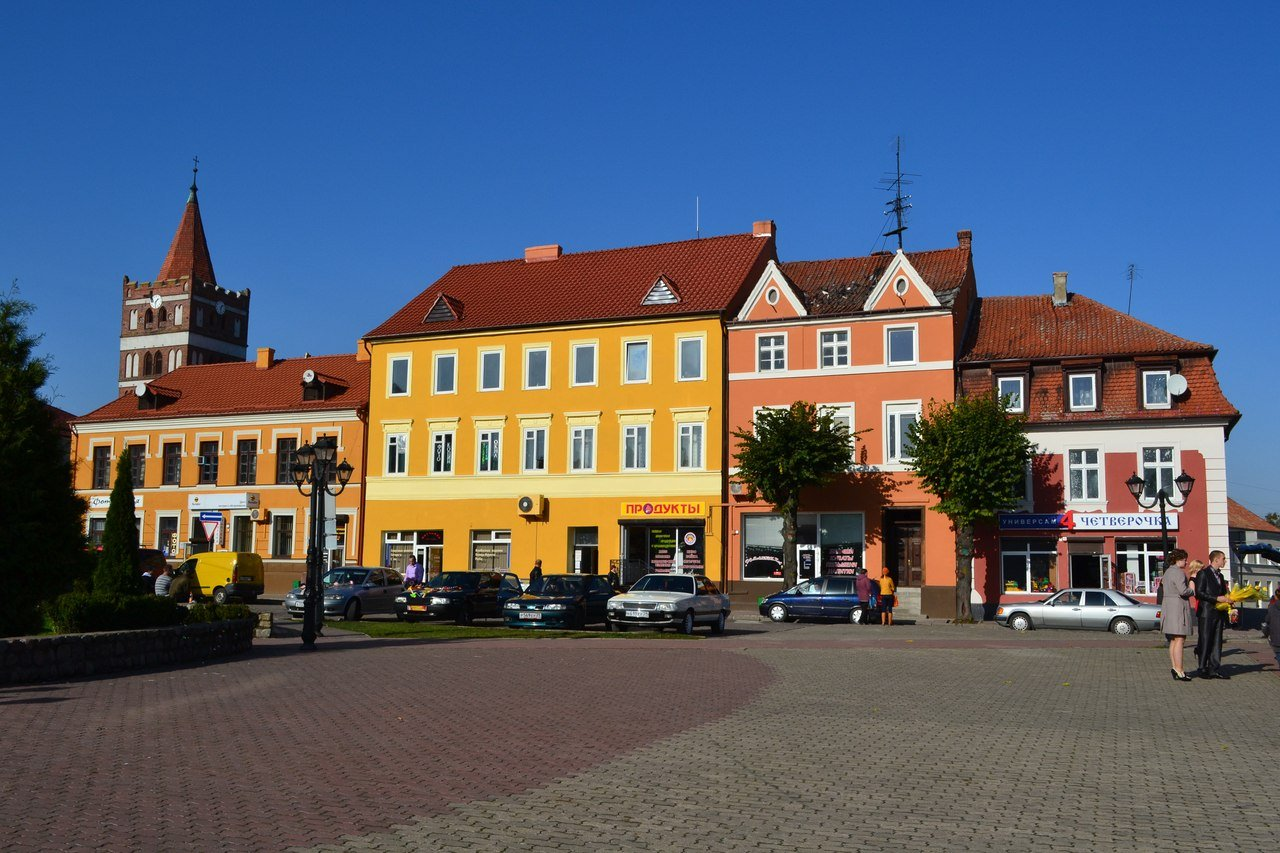
- Main square with St. George church in the background

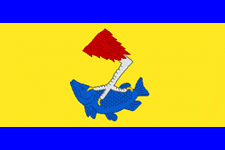
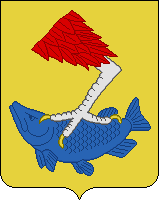
- Flag Coat of arms
- Interactive map of Pravdinsk
- Location of Pravdinsk Pravdinsk (Kaliningrad Oblast)
- Coordinates: 54°26′N 21°02′E
- Country: Russia
- Federal subject: Kaliningrad Oblast
- Administrative district: Pravdinsky District
- Town of district significanceSelsoviet: Pravdinsk
- Founded: 1312
- Town status since: 1335
- Elevation: 20 m (66 ft)

Population (2010 Census)
  - Total: 4,323
  - Estimate (2023): 3,934 (−9%)

Administrative status
  - Capital of: Pravdinsky District, town of district significance of Pravdinsk

Municipal status
  - Urban okrug: Pravdinsky Urban Okrug
  - Capital of: Pravdinsky Urban Okrug
- Time zone: UTC+2 (MSK–1)
- Postal code: 238400
- Dialing code: +7 40157
- OKTMO ID: 27519000001
- Website: friedland39.ru

Pravdinsk (Russian: Пра́вдинск, prior to 1946 known by its German name Friedland, Polish: Frydląd, Lithuanian: Romuva), is a town and the administrative center of Pravdinsky District in Kaliningrad Oblast, Russia. It is on the Lava River and is 30 kilometers (19 mi) east of Bagrationovsk and 53 kilometers (33 mi) southeast of Kaliningrad. Population figures: 4,323 (2010 census); 4,480 (2002 census); 4,143 (1989 Soviet census).

== History ==
Pravdinsk was founded in 1312 at a ford across the Lava River after the local Natangian tribe in Prussia was subdued by the Teutonic Knights, and received town privileges in 1335 under Grand Master Luther von Braunschweig. It was known by its German language name Friedland ("peaceful land"). In 1440 the town joined the anti-Teutonic Prussian Confederation, at the request of which Polish King Casimir IV Jagiellon signed the act of incorporation of the region to the Kingdom of Poland in 1454. The town was devastated during the subsequent Thirteen Years' War, the longest of all Polish–Teutonic wars. After the war, Friedland once again became part of the State of the Teutonic Order, which from then on was a fief of Poland. The town's seal was attached to the documents of the peace treaty. In 1525, the town became a part of the Duchy of Prussia, a vassal duchy of Poland, after the secularization of the State of the Teutonic Order. From 1618, it was ruled by Dukes of Brandenburg from the Hohenzollern dynasty, remaining under Polish suzerainty until 1657, when Prussia gained independence. It was again damaged by Swedish troops in the course of the Second Northern War 1655–1660.

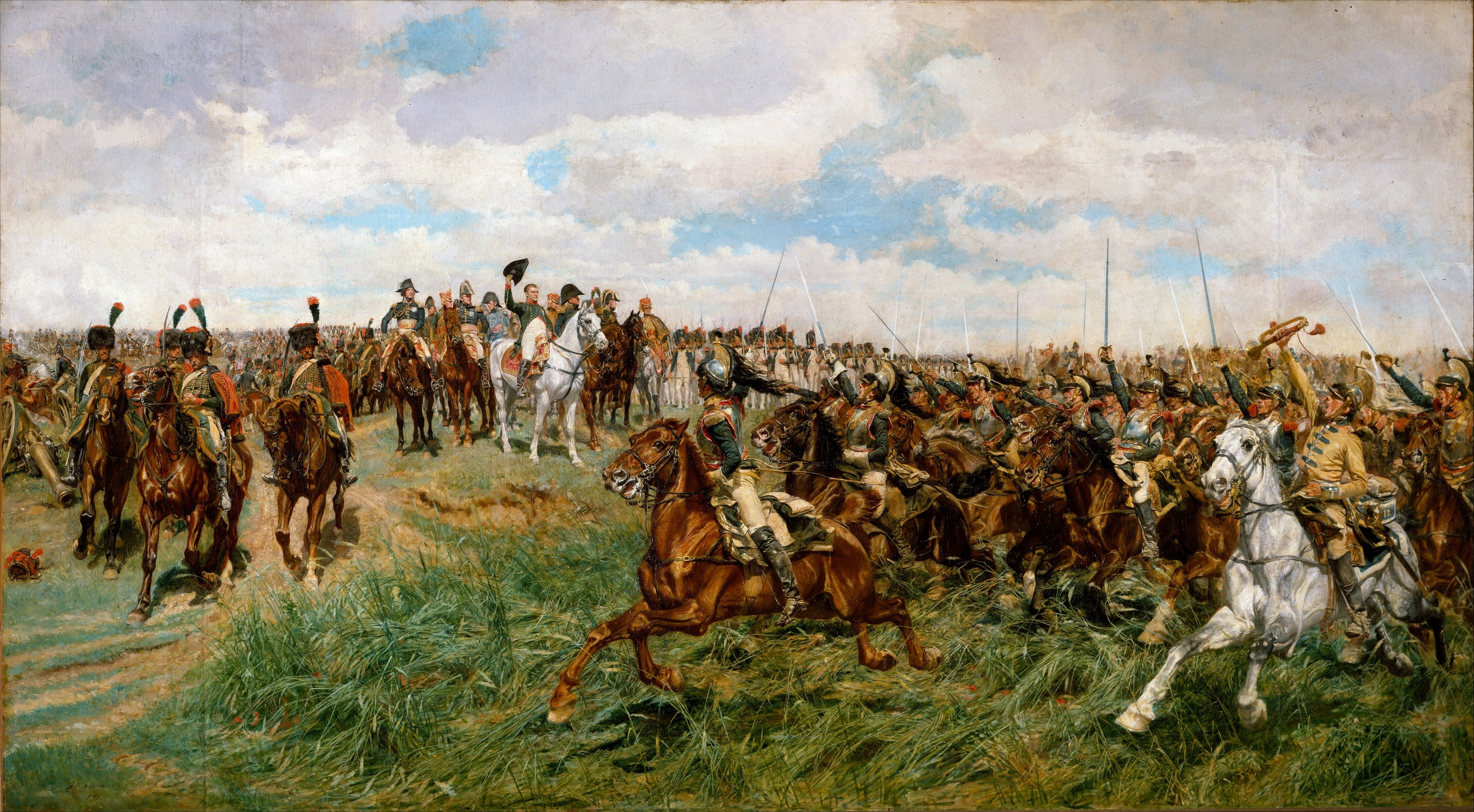
Battle of Friedland of 1807, depicted in a 19th-century painting by Ernest Meissonier

Friedland belonged to the Kingdom of Prussia from 1701, and during the Napoleonic Wars on June 14, 1807, Napoleon's French army aided by Poles and Saxons won the nearby Battle of Friedland against a combined Russian-Prussian army. The town became part of the German Empire in 1871, during the Prussian-led unification of Germany.

During World War II, Friedland was conquered by the Red Army on January 31, 1945 as part of the Soviet invasion of Germany. At the time Friedland belonged to Landkreis Bartenstein in the province of East Prussia, which was transferred from Nazi Germany to the Soviet Union according to the 1945 Potsdam Agreement. The German population fled or was expelled, and East Prussia was divided between the Soviet Union and the People's Republic of Poland, with Friedland belonging to the portion organized into Kaliningrad Oblast of the Russian SFSR. The town was made the administrative center of Fridlyandsky District under the name Fridlyand, but were renamed Pravdinsk and Pravdinsky District in 1946.

== Administrative and municipal status ==
Within the framework of administrative divisions, Pravdinsk serves as the administrative center of Pravdinsky District. As an administrative division, it is, together with thirty-two rural localities, incorporated within Pravdinsky District as the town of district significance of Pravdinsk.

Within the framework of municipal divisions, since May 5, 2015, the territories of the town of district significance of Pravdinsk, the urban-type settlement of district significance of Zheleznodorozhny, and of two rural okrugs of Pravdinsky District are incorporated as Pravdinsky Urban Okrug. Before that, the town of district significance was incorporated within Pravdinsky Municipal District as Pravdinskoye Urban Settlement.

== Religion ==
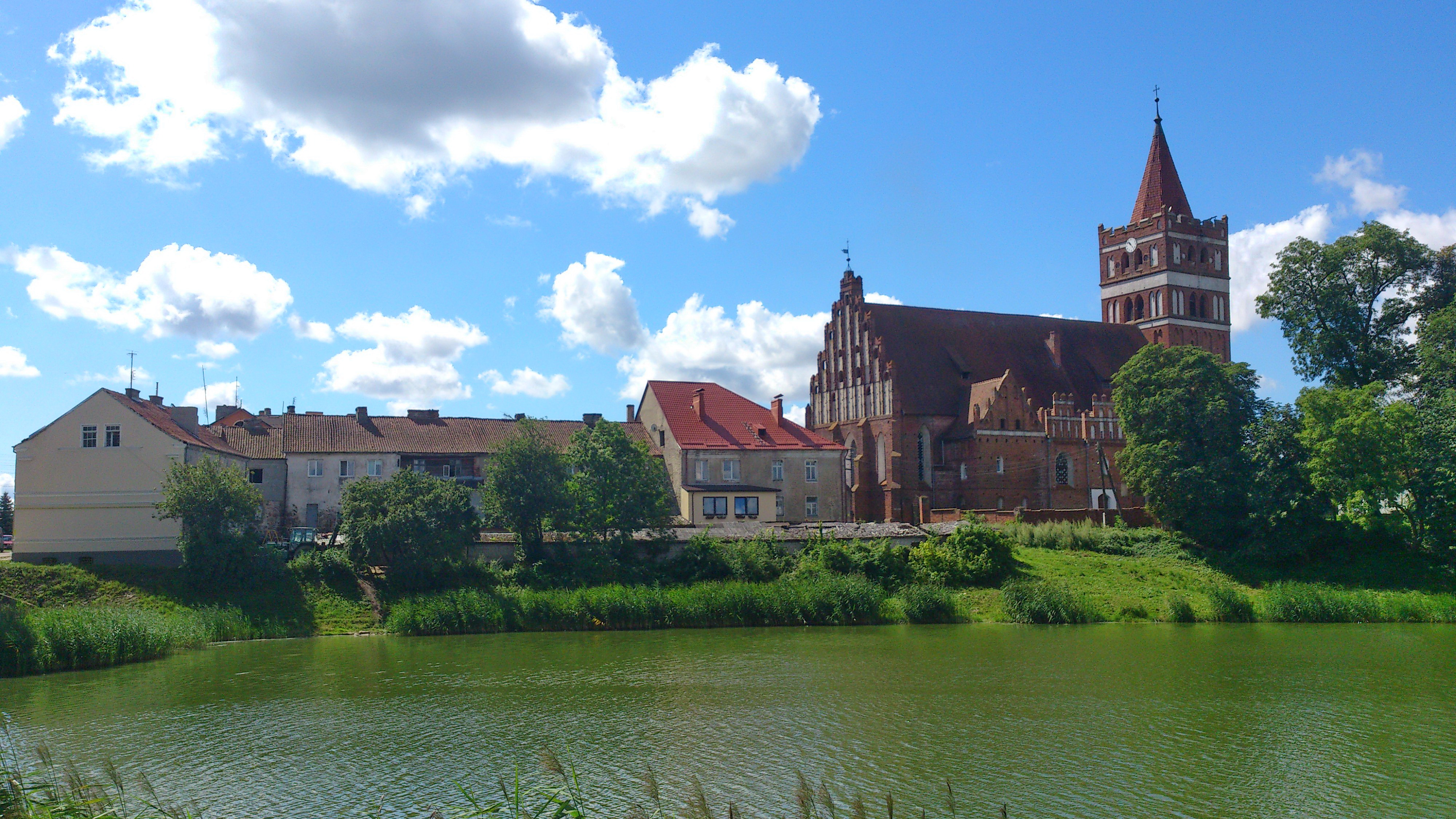
St. George Church in Pravdinsk

The Late Gothic church of St. George in the town center is well preserved and today used by the Moscow Patriarchate.

Pravdinsk is identified in some historical accounts with Romuva, said to be the center of Baltic paganism. The Lithuanian name for Pravdinsk is Romuva, and this was most likely its name in Old Prussian as well. Whether Romuva was in fact associated with Baltic paganism is disputed, however, as it has been suggested that this belief started when early Christian chroniclers were confused by the similarity between "Romuva" and "Rome", and by their own unwarranted assumption that Baltic paganism should resemble Roman paganism in being focused around a particular geographical center.

== Notable people ==
- Celestyn Myślenta (1588–1653), Polish Lutheran theologian and rector of the University of Königsberg, attended the local school
- Otto Saro (1818–1888), Prussian lawyer and chief state prosecutor in Königsberg
- Florian Essenfelder (1855–1929), piano maker active in Germany and Brazil
- Artyom Danilenko (born 1990), Russian professional football player

== International relations ==
Pravdinsk is part of the Friedliches Land (Peaceful Land) municipal association with:

- Frýdlant, Czech Republic
- Frýdlant nad Ostravicí, Czech Republic
- Friedland, Brandenburg, Germany
- Friedland, Mecklenburg-Vorpommern, Germany
- Friedland, Lower Saxony, Germany
- Korfantów (Friedland in Oberschlesien), Poland
- Mieroszów (Friedland in Niederschlesien), Poland
