= Wilhelm Schmiedeberg =

German lawyer and portraitist

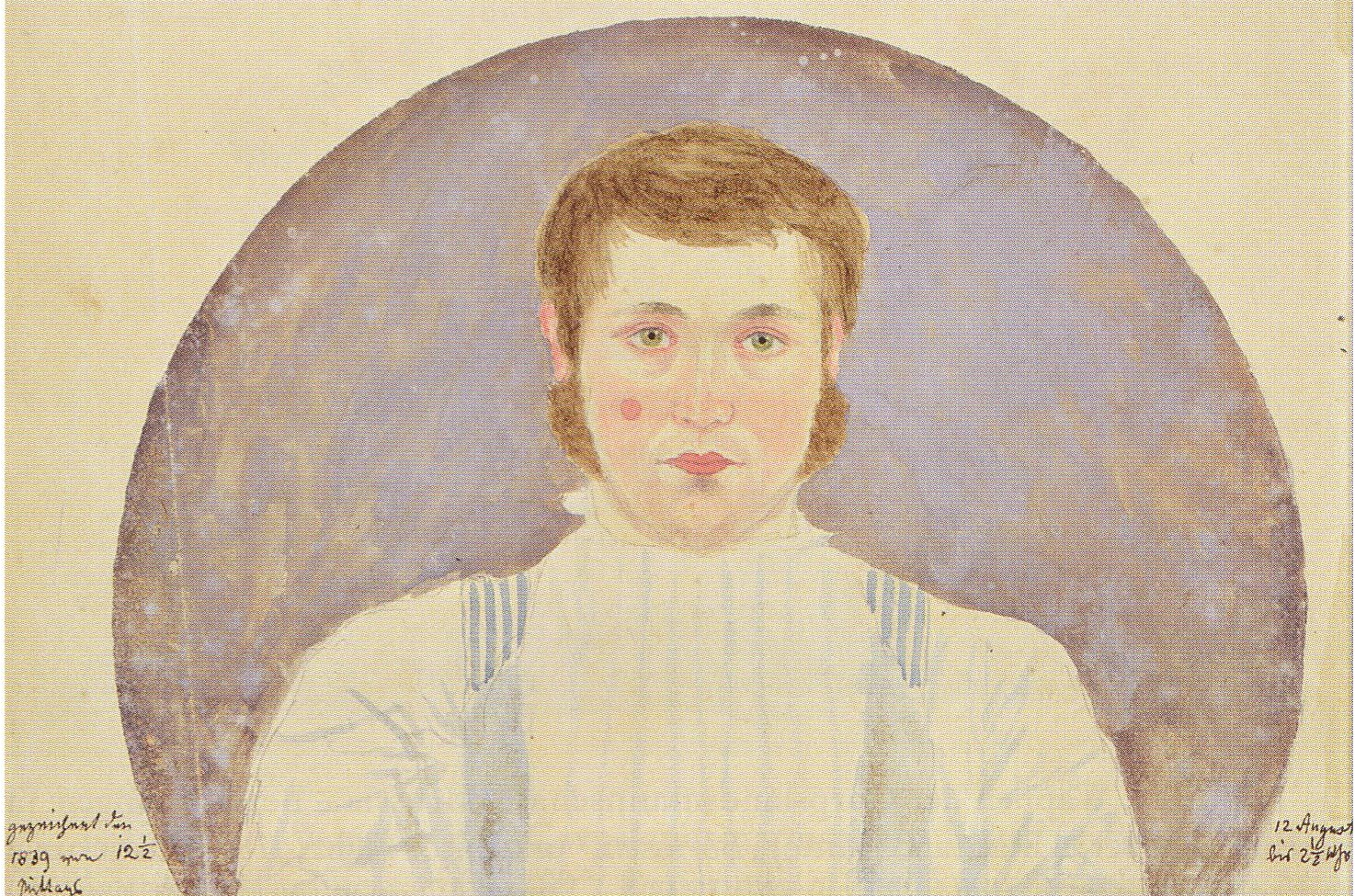
- Wilhelm Schmiedeberg Self portrait of a mirror image 1839
- Born: Eduard Friedrich Wilhelm Schmiedeberg; 25 April 1815; Königsberg, East Prussia
- Died: ca. 1865; Königsberg, Prussia, German Confederation
- Education: Albertus University, Königsberg
- Occupations: Lawyer & Judge; Watercolour portraitist

Wilhelm Schmiedeberg (25 April 1815 – c. 1865) was a German lawyer and portraitist. It is likely that he would now be forgotten, were it not for the album he compiled during his time as a student at Königsberg with the somewhat fanciful title "Blätter der Erinnerung" ("Pages of memory"), which was filled with watercolour portraits of student contemporaries.

== Life ==
Eduard Friedrich Wilhelm Schmiedeberg's father, Martin Friedrich Wilhelm Schmiedeberg, was a pharmacist and, after 1814, the proprietor of Königsberg's "Crowns Pharmacy" ("Kronenapotheke"). His mother, born Johanna Wilhelmina Collins, was the daughter of a banker: Edvard Collins was the Königsberg branch director for the Prussian State Bank, as it became known later.

Wilhelm Schmeideberg the son was baptised on 14 May 1815 in the Lutheran church at Sackheim a quarter in the eastern part of central Königsberg. It is thought that he attended the Gymnasium (secondary school) in Königsberg till 1832, but his public schooling was complemented by private tuition. It was probably because of his parents' divorce that he switched to the Catholic Gymnasium at Braunsberg, some 50 km to the south-west of Königsberg, which he attended between 1832 and 1834. Between 11 May and 23 June 1833, still aged only 18, and identified simply as "Schmiedeberg, Braunsberg", he exhibited at the third arts and crafts exhibition ("Kunst- und Gewerbeausstellung") in Königsberg a work entitled "General Chassee, Copie", (Note: The slightly unconventional spelling of "General Chassee, Copie" is identified in the source as being part of a direct quotation.) He exhibited again at Königsberg 's fourth arts and crafts exhibition between 6 May and 3 June 1834, presenting two copper-plate engravings: their subject matter is not known. Back home in Braunsberg he found he had passed his school final exams on 15 August 1834. Just four days later, on 19 August 1834, he enrolled (Note: The Matriculation register is now held at Thorn) at the Albertus University, Königsberg to study jurisprudence.

Like many of his fellow students he joined the newly founded Baltia student fraternity. The fraternity's adherents were mostly drawn from the catholic region known at that time as the Ermland. In November 1840 the Baltia was subsumed into the larger Masovia fraternity, taking Schmiedeberg with it. He passed his referendary (public service) exam. It is recorded in the Deanery records of the Philosophy faculty that he was awarded a doctorate in his absence on 15 June 1838. Unusually for this period, he was awarded the doctorate without being called upon to submit an oral defence of his inaugural dissertation, the title and subject of which are not known.

He became an enthusiastic backer of the philosophy of Johann Georg Hamann, frequently identified during the twentieth century as a leading proponent of the Counter-Enlightenment, although current historiography is more finely nuanced. He was also attentive as a student of Karl Rosenkranz. It was with a letter of introduction from Rosenkranz that Schmiedeberg visited the art specialist Franz Theodor Kugler at Berlin, early in 1838. The idea of the visit was that he should take the opportunity to build in Berlin a reputation as a painter of wholesome Königsberg intellectuality. (Note: "...acquire in Berlin a reputation as a painter of wholesome intellectuality..." "...in Berlin sich von der Kunst und einem gediegneren Geistesleben, als wir es hier haben, eine Anschauung zu schaffen") The letter of recommendation from Rosenkranz, dated 28 April 1838, makes it clear that by this time Schmiedeberg was already qualified for government service and could be recommended as a talented artist. He probably stayed in Berlin for the summer and autumn of 1838, possibly in order to study at the Arts Academy. It appears that he produced no portraits between 16 April and 16 December of that year, with just a single surviving watercolour, dated 22 August 1838, from the eight-month period. By the end of 1838 he was back in Königsberg.

In 1840 Schmiedeberg became a referendary (?registrar) at the regional high court in Königsberg. He was also, like his father, a member of the "Three Crowns" masonic lodge ("Johannisloge Zu den drei Kronen"). However, around 1842 and certainly by 1844 he resigned from his work with the Prussian legal service on grounds of ill health. He lived "privately" at Königstraße 60, a house in the city centre inherited from his father. He lost the ability to walk, probably while still in his early middle age.

It is highly probable that he died in Königsberg in 1865.

== Water colourist ==
Wilhelm Schmiedeberg's lasting legacy remains the portraits he painted The surviving works are mostly of fellow students from his time at university. The portraits focus on the faces of the sitters: he avoided painting people's hands.

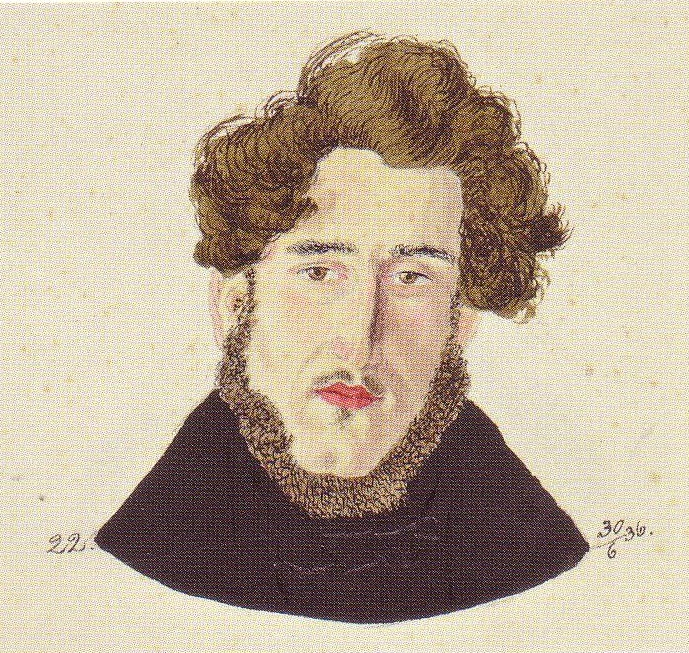
August Laws

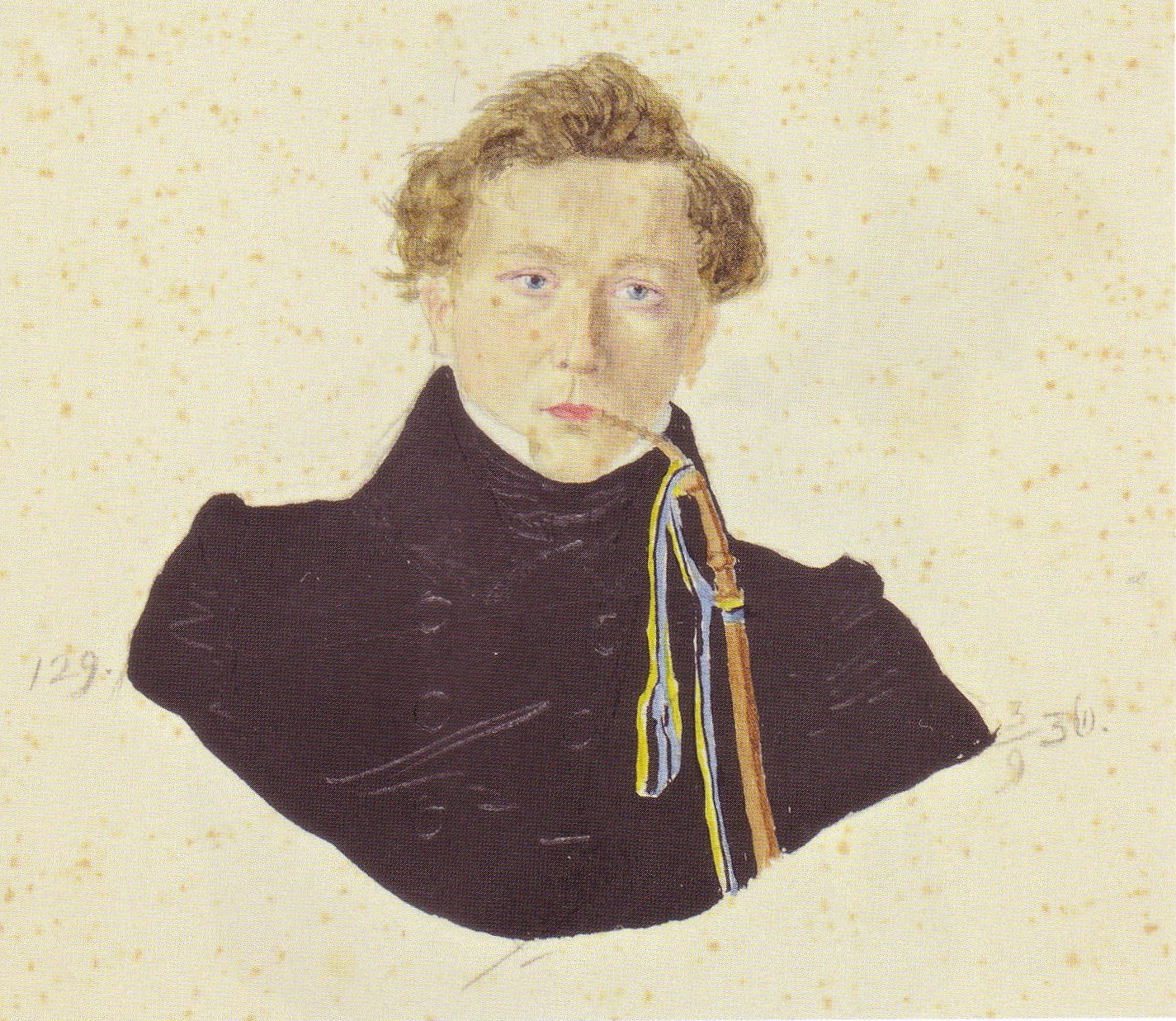
Leopold Quiring

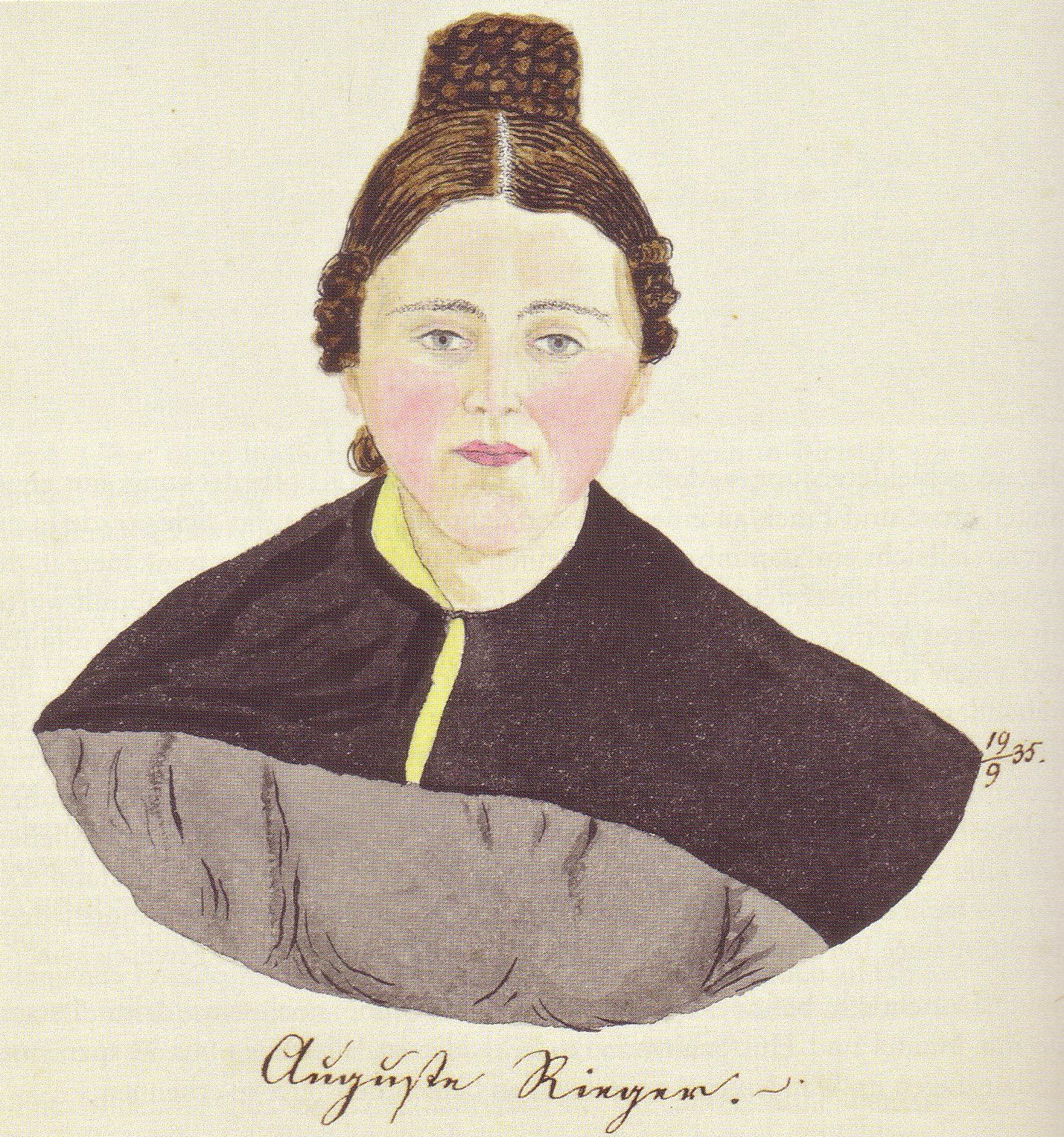
Auguste Rieger

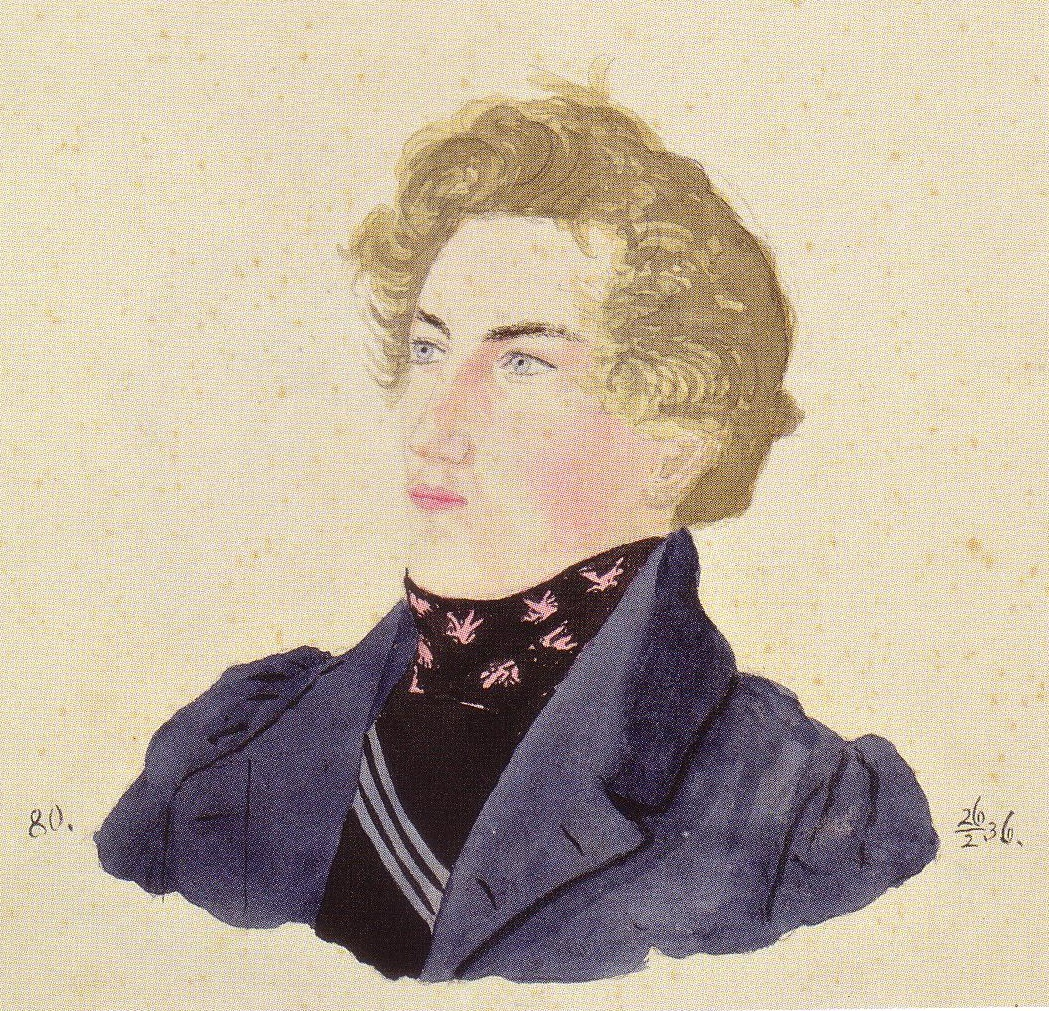
Otto Saro
