= Otto Saro =

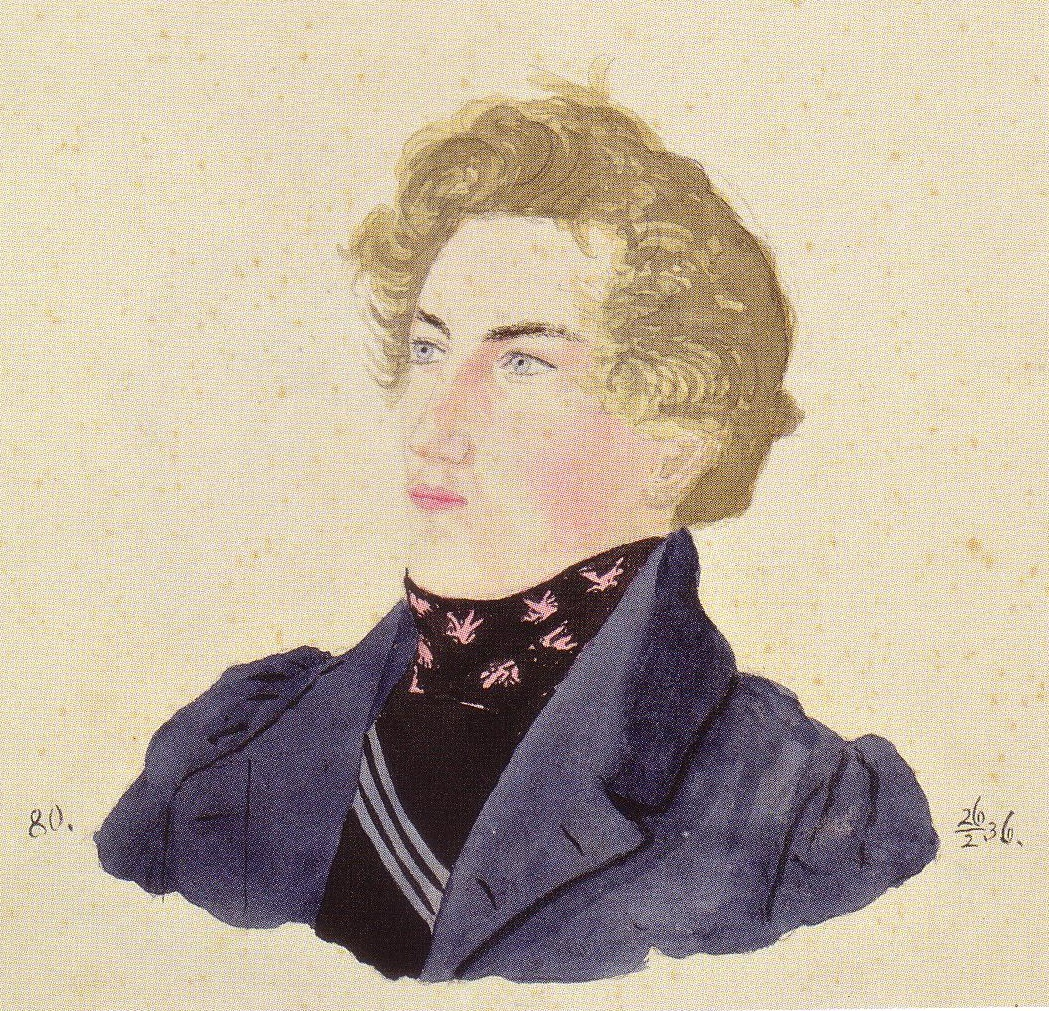
Otto Carl Saro dressed as a member of the "Scotia" student fraternity Wilhelm Schmiedeberg 1836

Otto Saro (1 February 1818 – 5 August 1888) was a Prussian lawyer who in 1879 or 1880 became the chief state prosecutor in Königsberg. He was also a Conservative politician, serving as a member of the Imperial Reichstag (parliament) between 1878 and his death ten years later.

== Life ==
Otto Carl Saro was born in Friedland, a small town in East Prussia, a short distance to the southeast of Königsberg. He attended the prestigious Collegium Fridericianum (secondary school) in Königsberg, moving on to study Medicine at the city's university. Quite soon he switched to Jurisprudence. At university he joined the independent Scotia student fraternity. During the Winter Termaan of 1834/35 he also joined the larger Masovia fraternity. Within the Masovia he was designated an "ausgezeichneter Senior". His time at university lasted from 1837 till 1842.

He entered the Prussian justice service and completed his preliminary period. In 1842 he was appointed a probationary judge at Marienwerder in what had been the neighbouring province of West Prussia until 1829 when East and West Prussia were merged to form a single province. From 1843 he was working a judge at the West Prussian district court in Konitz. In 1849 he became a district prosecutor at Graudenz, taking up the same position at Königsberg in 1855. In 1858 he was appointed chief prosecutor at Insterburg. He returned to Königsberg in 1870, employed in the same position.

Saro sat as a member of the Prussian parliament in 1869/70. He was then, in 1878, elected to the Imperial Reichstag (national parliament) in 1878, representing Insterburg in the Gumbinnen electoral district. He sat as a member of the Conservative Party.
