= Ścinawa Mała =

- Village
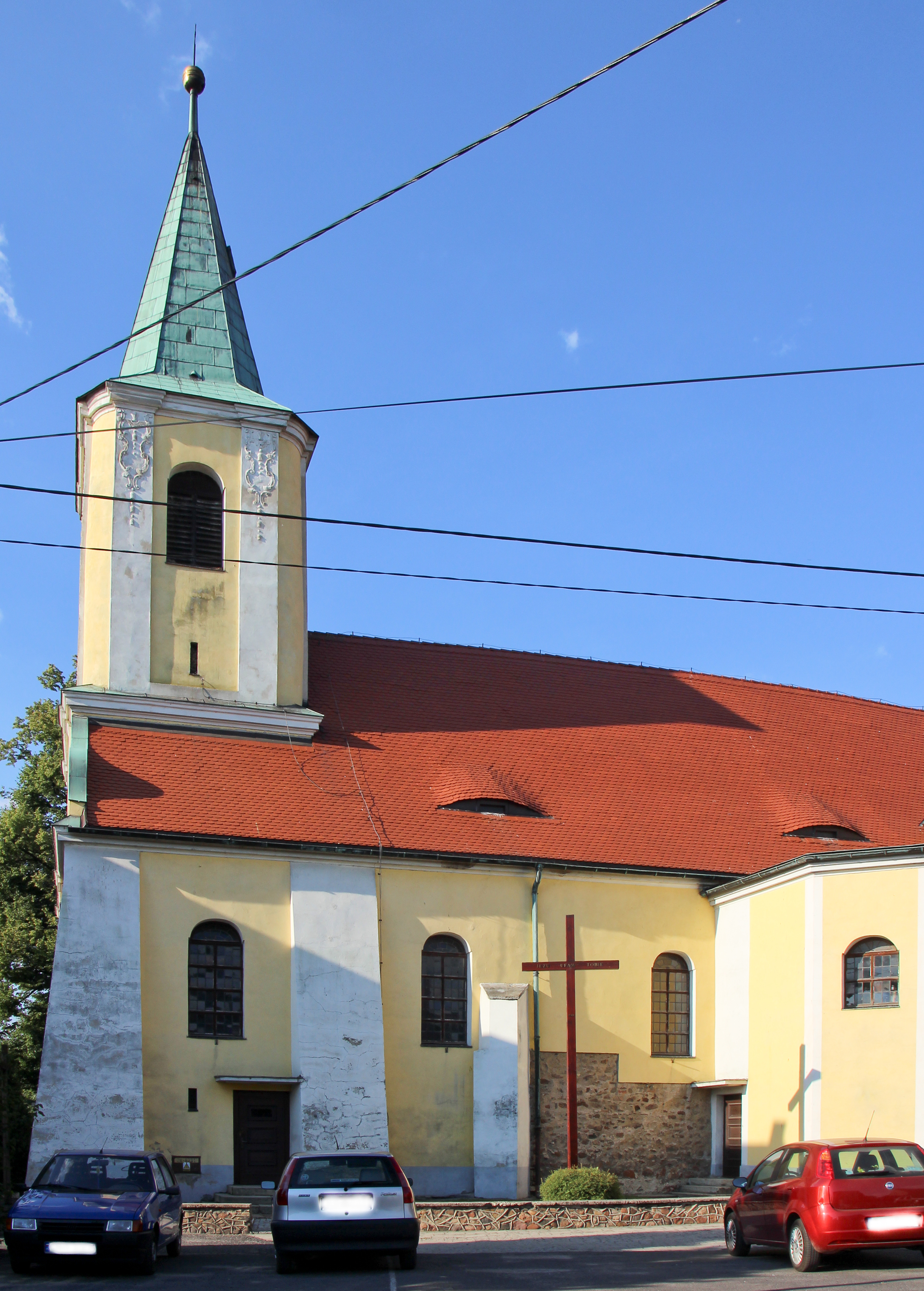

- Location within Poland
- Coordinates: 50°25′N 17°32′E
- Country: Poland
- Voivodeship: Opole
- County: Nysa
- Gmina: Korfantów

Ścinawa Mała [ɕt͡ɕiˈnava ˈmawa] (German: Steinau) is a village in the administrative district of Gmina Korfantów, within Nysa County, Opole Voivodeship, in south-western Poland.

== See also ==
- Prudnik Land
