= Przechód, Opole Voivodeship =

Przechód
- Village
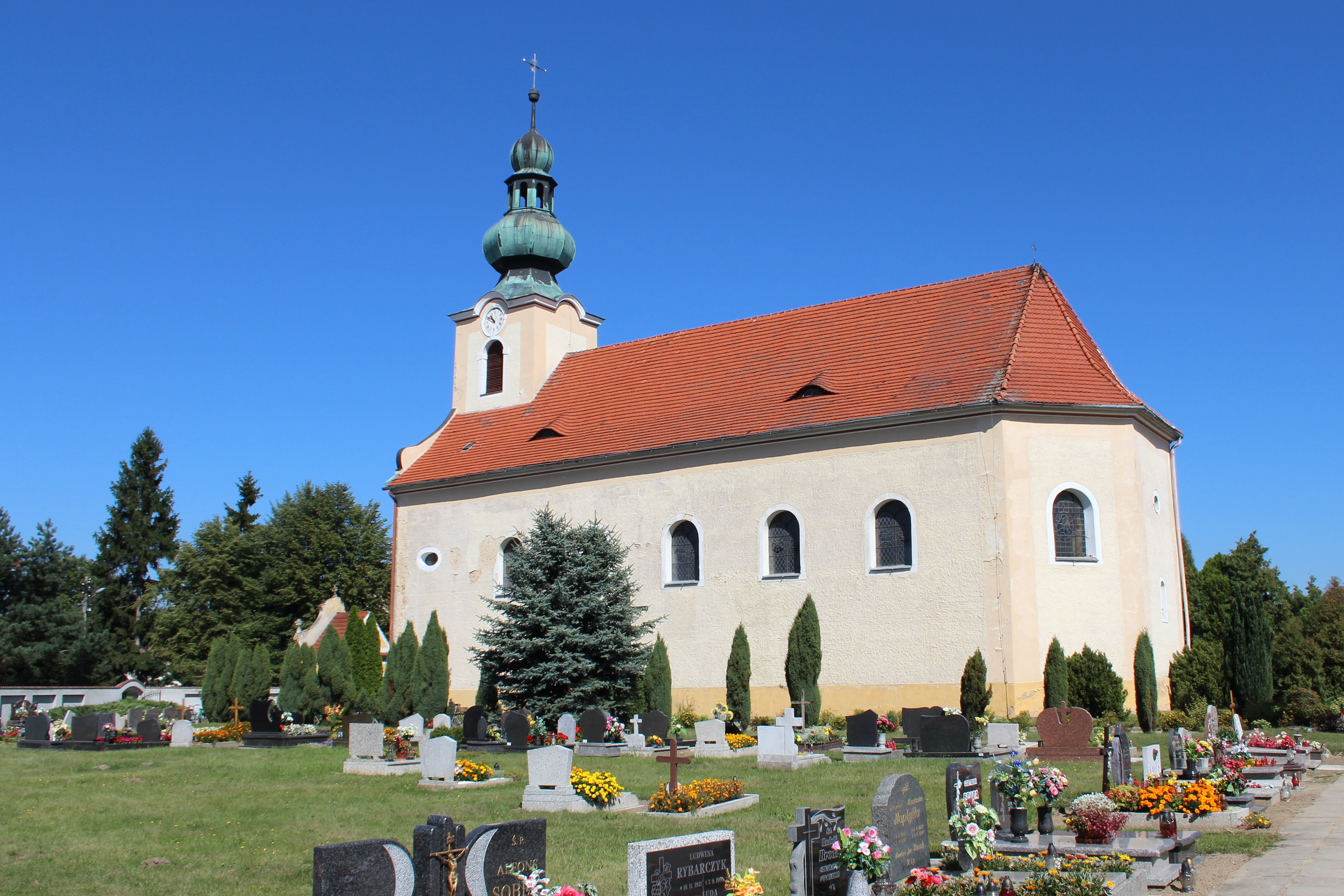
- Saint John the Baptist church

- Location within Poland
- Coordinates: 50°31′58″N 17°39′49″E
- Country: Poland
- Voivodeship: Opole
- County: Nysa
- Gmina: Korfantów

Przechód [ˈpʂɛxut] (German: Psychod) is a village in the administrative district of Gmina Korfantów, within Nysa County, Opole Voivodeship, in south-western Poland.

== See also ==
- Prudnik Land
