= Niesiebędowice =

- Village
- Location within Poland
- Coordinates: 50°30′36″N 17°34′00″E
- Country: Poland
- Voivodeship: Opole
- County: Nysa
- Gmina: Korfantów

Niesiebędowice [ɲɛɕɛbɛndɔˈvit͡sɛ] (German: Nüssdorf) is a village in the administrative district of Gmina Korfantów, within Nysa County, Opole Voivodeship, in south-western Poland.
