= Jegielnica =

- Village
- Location within Poland
- Coordinates: 50°26′27″N 17°32′12″E
- Country: Poland
- Voivodeship: Opole
- County: Nysa
- Gmina: Korfantów
- Population: 185

Jegielnica [jɛɡʲɛlˈnit͡sa] (German: Jäglitz) is a village in the administrative district of Gmina Korfantów, within Nysa County, Opole Voivodeship, in Niederschlesien, south-western Poland.
