= Podgórze, Nysa County =

Podgórze
- Village
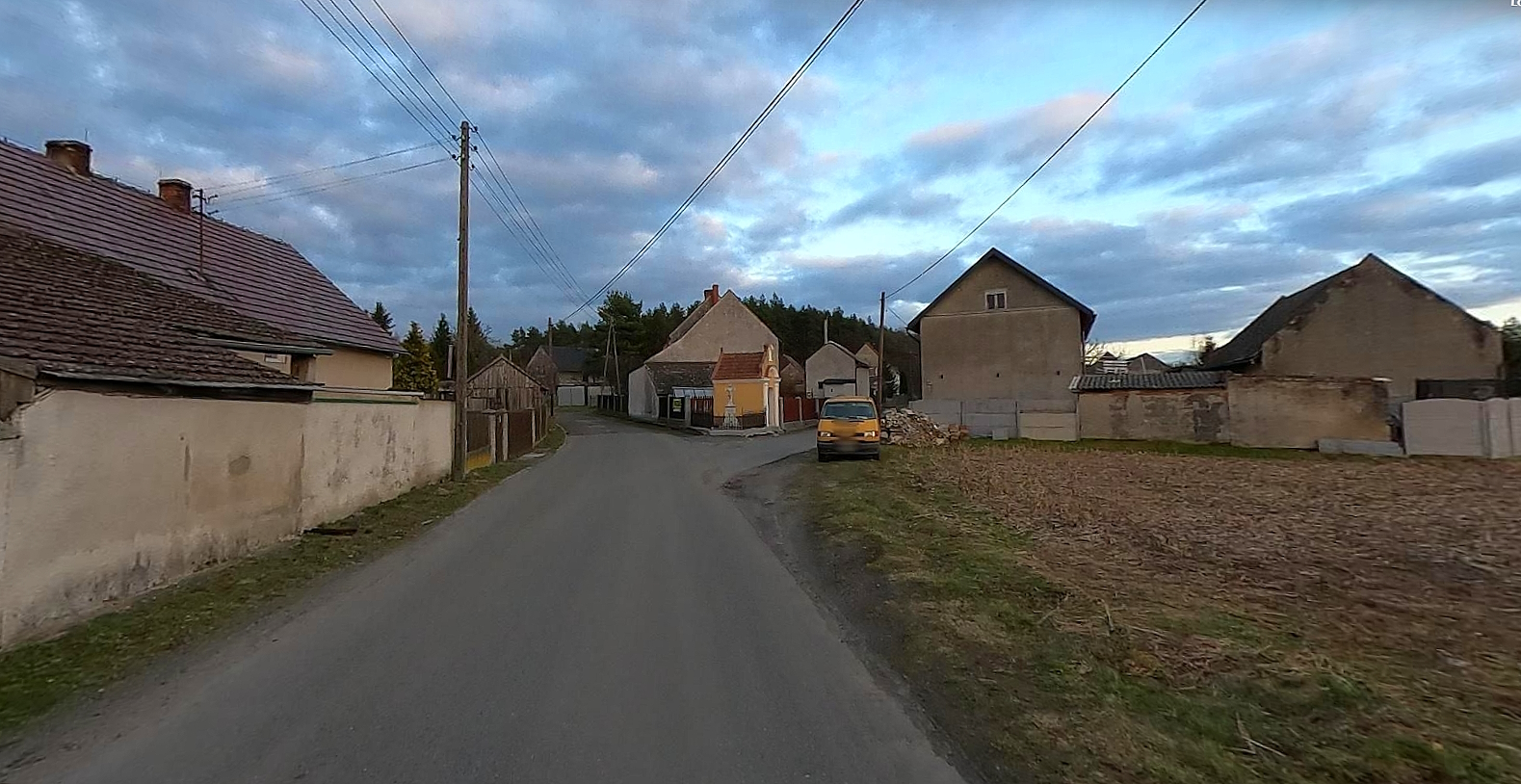

- Location within Poland
- Coordinates: 50°32′22″N 17°40′58″E
- Country: Poland
- Voivodeship: Opole
- County: Nysa
- Gmina: Korfantów
- Time zone: UTC+1 (CET)
  - Summer (DST): UTC+2
- Area code: +4877
- Vehicle registration: ONY

Podgórze is a village in the administrative district of Gmina Korfantów, within Nysa County, Opole Voivodeship, south-western Poland.
