= Ścinawa Nyska =

- Village
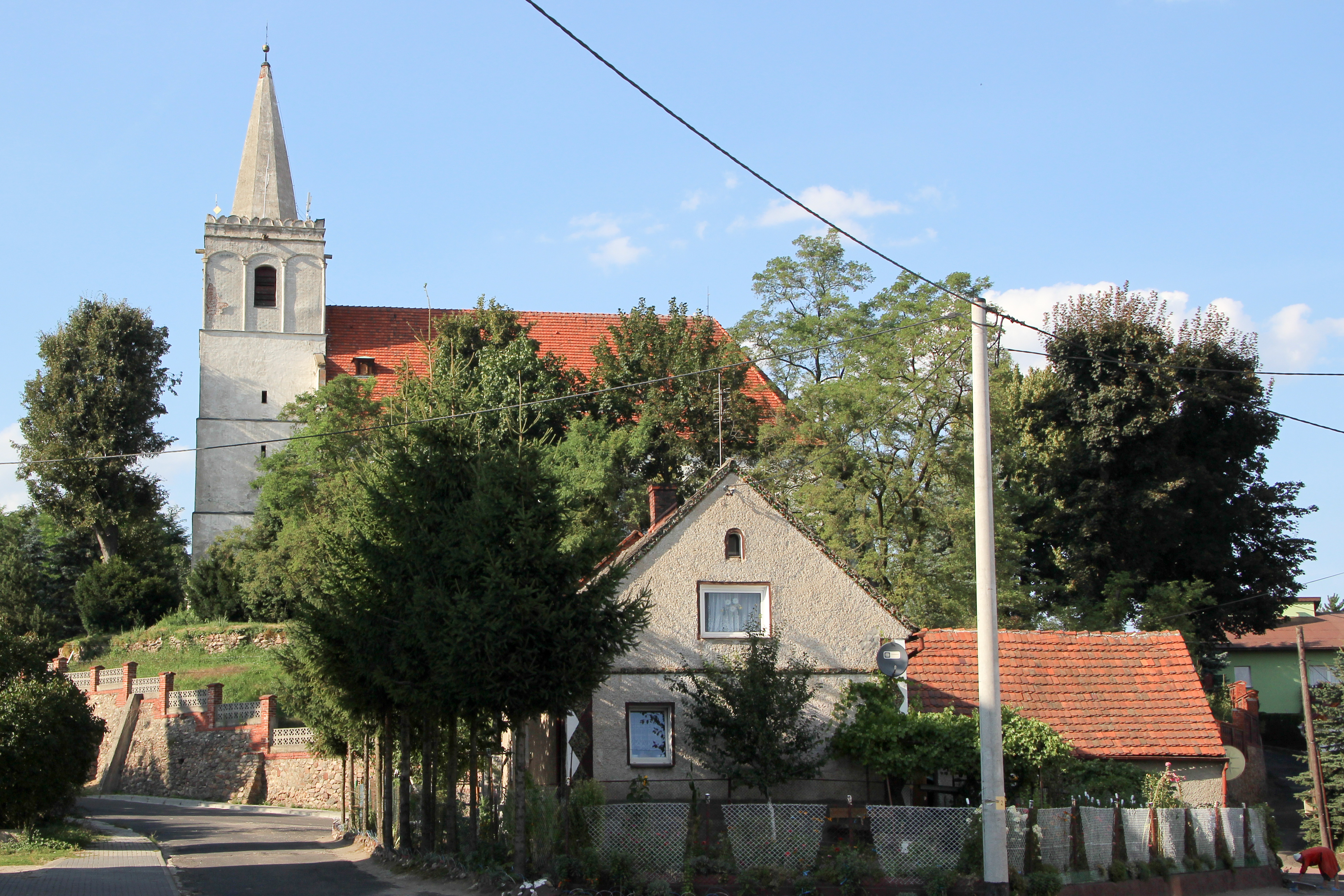

- Location within Poland
- Coordinates: 50°25′14″N 17°32′8″E
- Country: Poland
- Voivodeship: Opole
- County: Nysa
- Gmina: Korfantów
- Population: 630

Ścinawa Nyska [ɕt͡ɕiˈnava ˈnɨska] (German: Steinsdorf) is a village in the administrative district of Gmina Korfantów, within Nysa County, Opole Voivodeship, in south-western Poland.
