= Węża =

- Village
- Location within Poland
- Coordinates: 50°26′N 17°30′E
- Country: Poland
- Voivodeship: Opole
- County: Nysa
- Gmina: Korfantów

Węża [ˈvɛ̃ʐa] (German: Prockendorf) is a village in the administrative district of Gmina Korfantów, within Nysa County, Opole Voivodeship, in south-western Poland.
