= Rynarcice, Opole Voivodeship =

Rynarcice
- Village
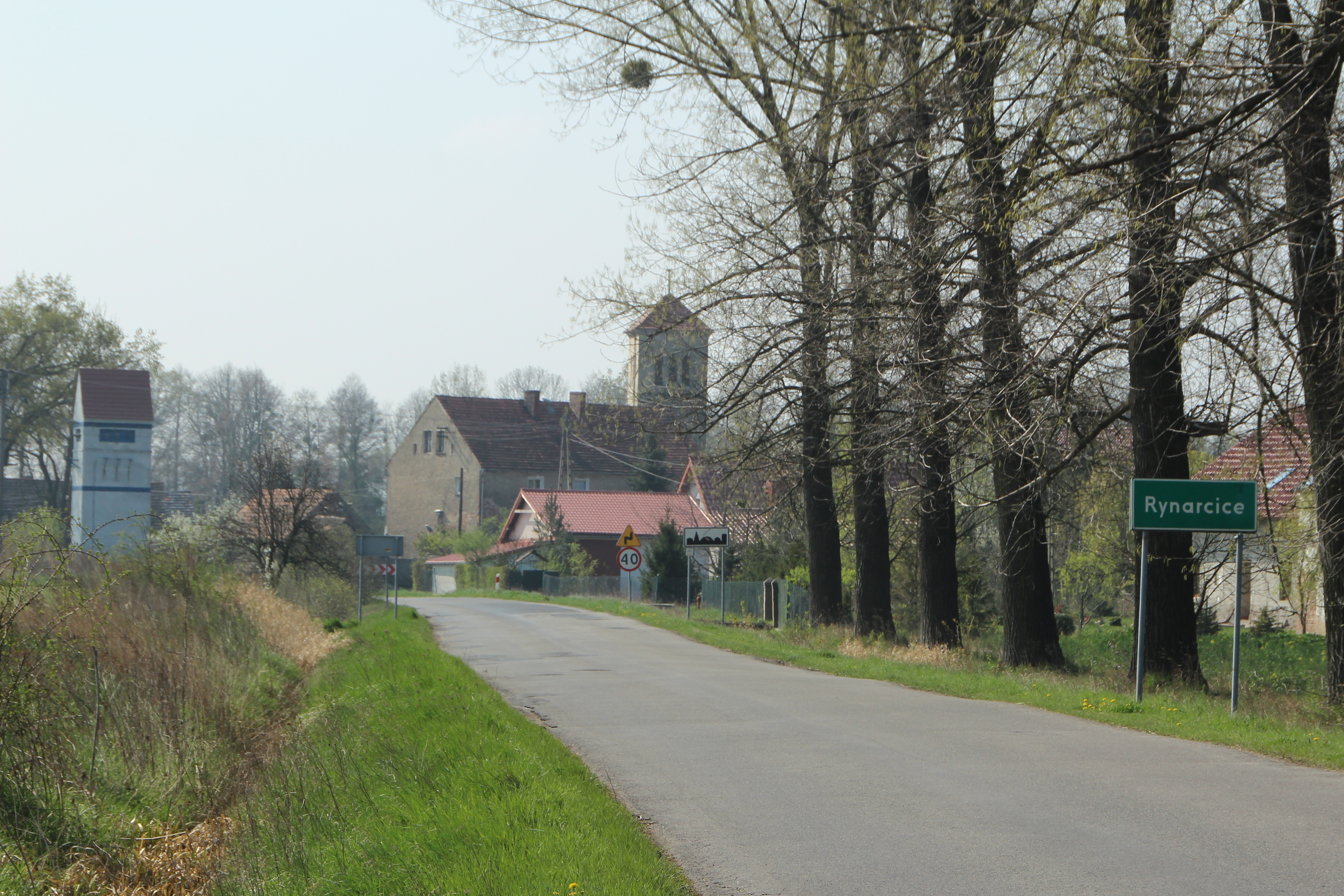

- Location within Poland
- Coordinates: 50°28′N 17°33′E
- Country: Poland
- Voivodeship: Opole
- County: Nysa
- Gmina: Korfantów

Rynarcice [rɨnarˈt͡ɕit͡sɛ] (German: Rennersdorf) is a village in the administrative district of Gmina Korfantów, within Nysa County, Opole Voivodeship, in south-western Poland.
