= Gryżów =

- Village
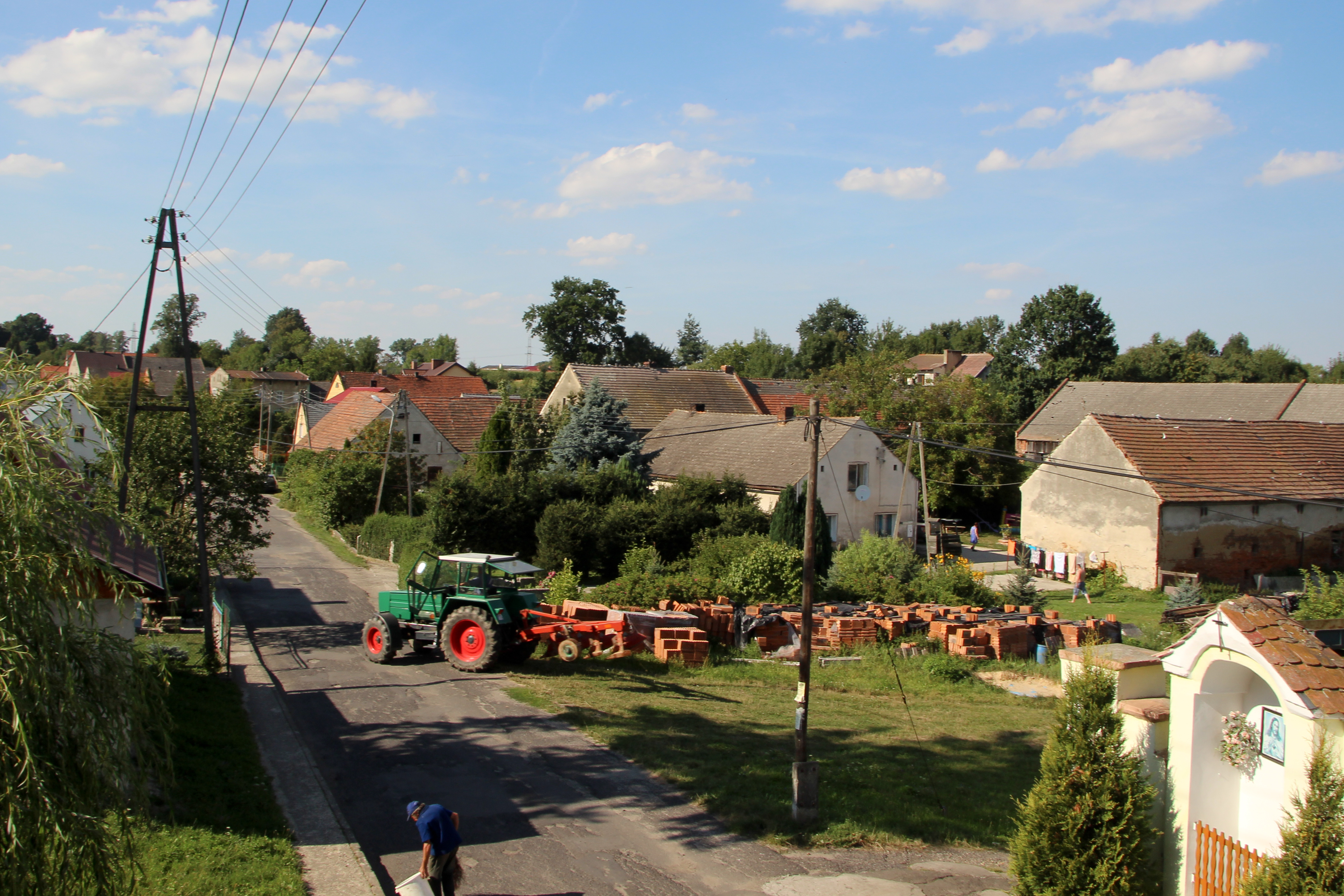

- Location within Poland
- Coordinates: 50°24′23″N 17°29′59″E
- Country: Poland
- Voivodeship: Opole
- County: Nysa
- Gmina: Korfantów
- Population: 352

Gryżów [ˈɡrɨʐuf] (German: Greisau) is a village in the administrative district of Gmina Korfantów, within Nysa County, Opole Voivodeship, in south-western Poland.
