= Józef Wojaczek =

Polish Catholic priest (1901–1993)

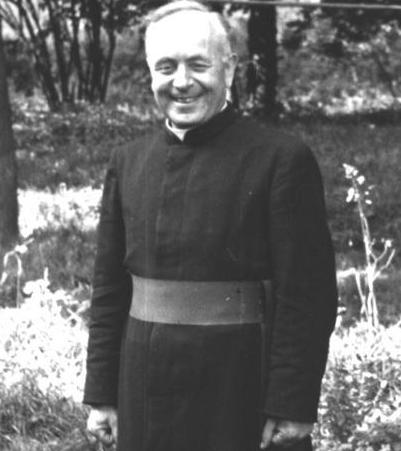

Provincial superior of Mariannhillers in Poland
- In office 1946–1952

Personal life
- Born: April 14, 1901 Prudnik, Upper Silesia, German Empire
- Died: April 8, 1993 (aged 91) Reimlingen, Bavaria, West Germany

Religious life
- Religion: Roman Catholicism
- Order: Mariannhillers
- Ordination: 1929

Józef Wojaczek (14 April 1901 – 8 April 1993) was a Polish Roman Catholic Priest, member of the Mariannhill Missionaries.

== Early life and education ==
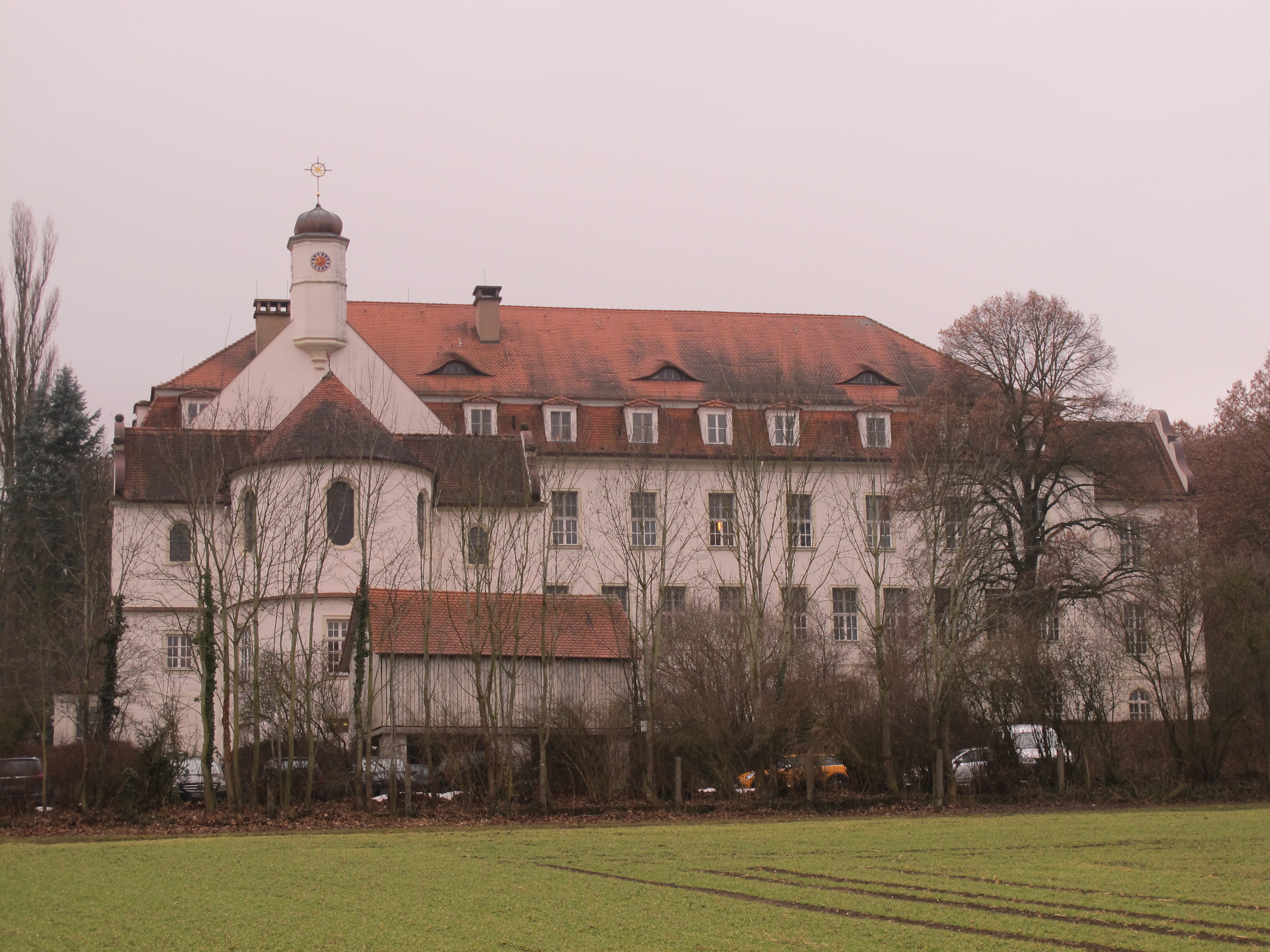
Monastery of Mariannhillers in Reimlingen

He was born on 14 April 1901 in Prudnik in the German Empire, as a son of Franciszek and his wife Maria. His father was a shoemaker. He had two sisters and two brothers. He was probably a relative of a Franciscan Gotthard Wojaczek (1872–1931), buried in the monastery cemetery at the church of St. Joseph in Prudnik.

In Prudnik, he worked as a locksmith in a textile factory (later known as "Frotex"). Thanks to the financial help he had received from his family, he left Prudnik and moved to Bavaria, where he entered the religious Congregation of the Missionaries of Mariannhill. After graduating from the religious gymnasium, based on the order of the school management, he went to further studies in the Netherlands, where he practiced in a monastery.

Three years later he returned to Bavaria. Until 1930 he continued his studies at the Philosophical and Theological University of Bavaria in Dillingen an der Donau. He was ordained priest in 1929 as a Mariannhiller.

== Priest ==
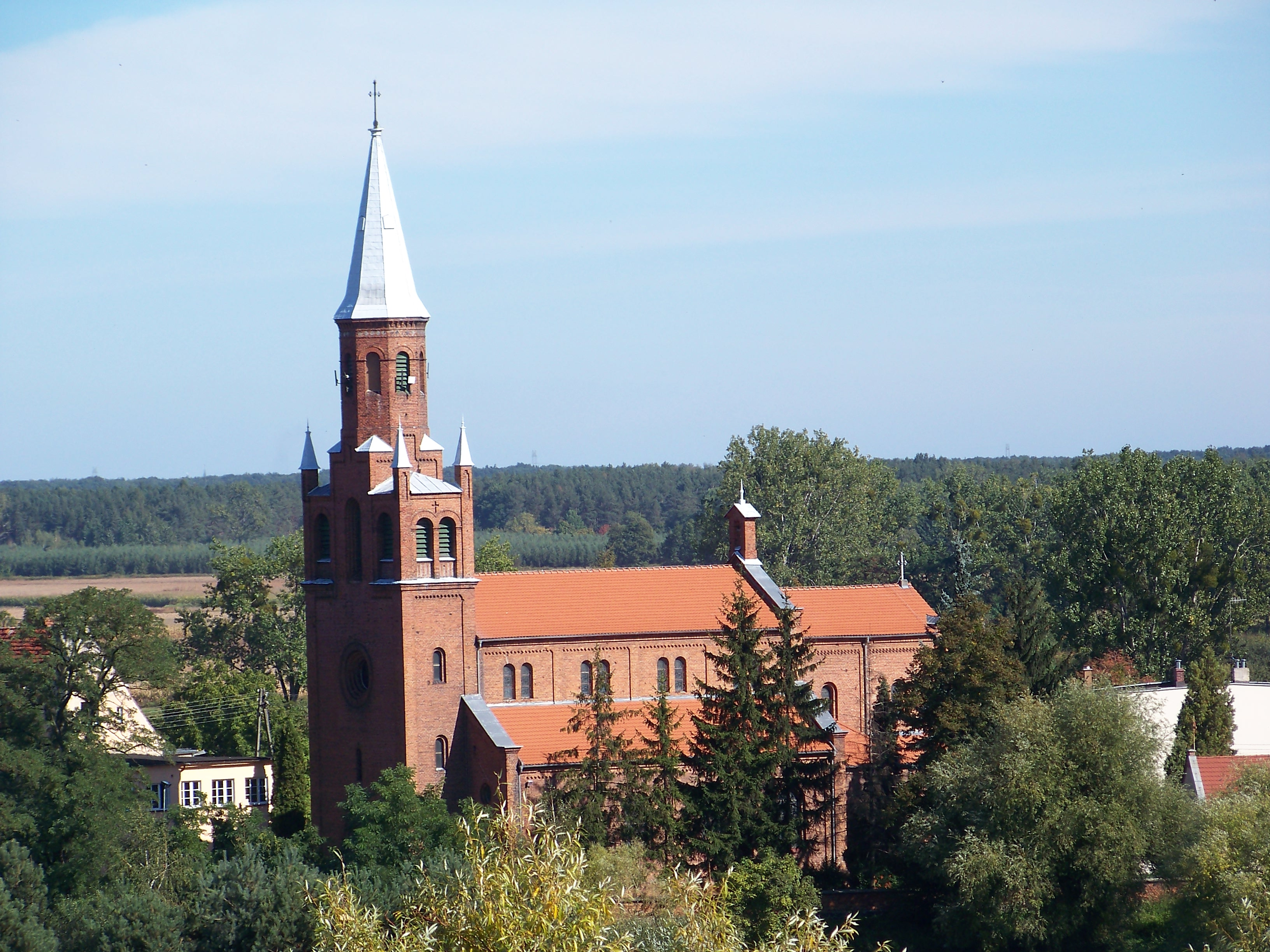
Church in Skorogoszcz

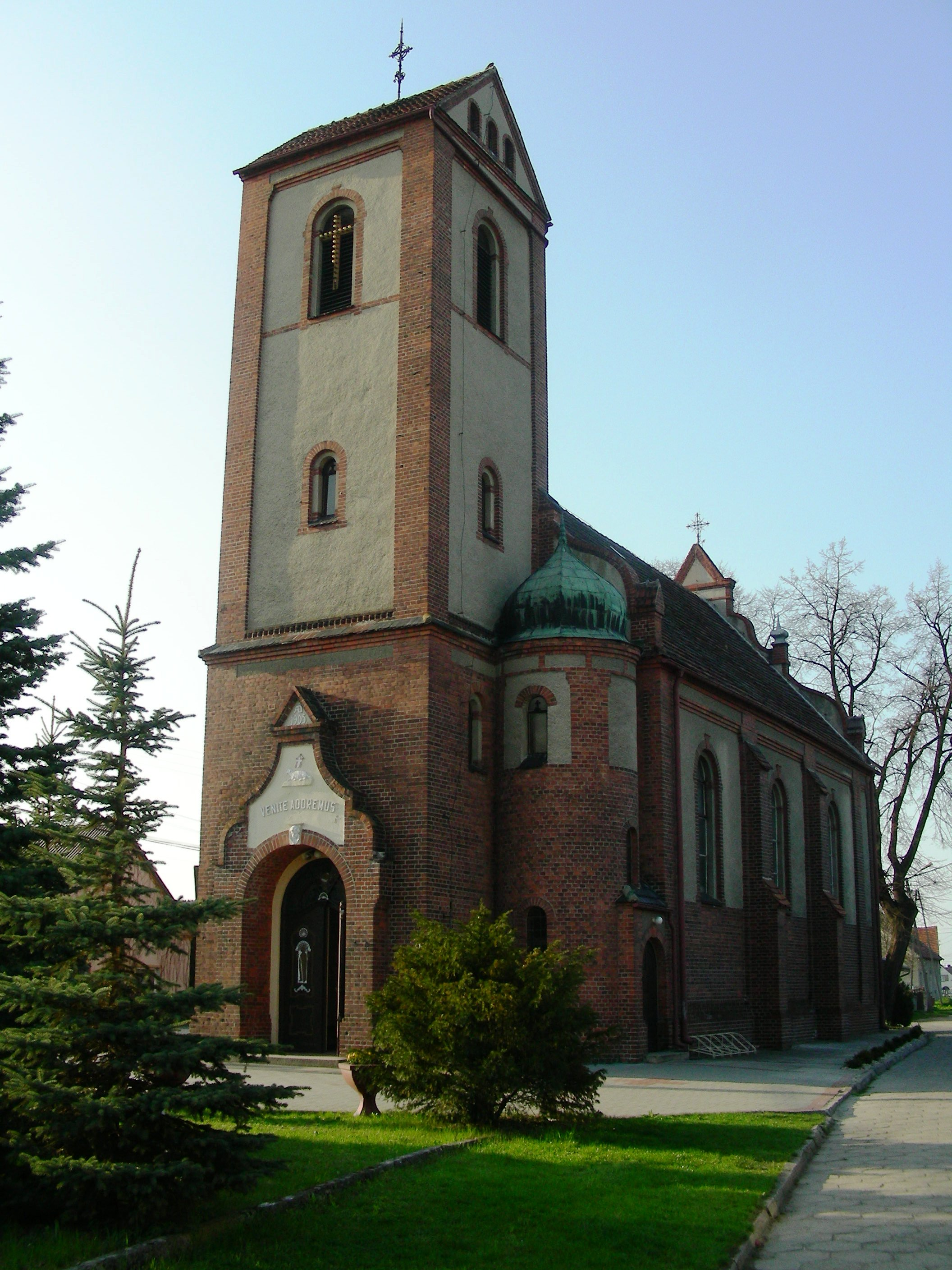
Church in Narok

Until 1933 he stayed in the monastery in Reimlingen. On the recommendation of the Superior General, he left the monastery and went to Altdorf in Switzerland, where he worked for two years as a history, Latin and religious teacher at the local school.

He returned to Upper Silesia in 1935. He was appointed a rector of the minor religious seminary and juvenate in Skorogoszcz. In 1941, the monastery was taken over by a SS unit, and the priests were expelled. Mariannhillers decided to keep watch over the Skorogoszcz estate. They appointed Józef Wojaczek as their guardian.

In the same year, he was appointed a pastor of the newly established parish in Narok near Opole, which included Narok and Golczowice. When the village was occupied by the Red Army, he often led its inhabitants against the Russians. He found the body of Father Jerzy Greiner, murdered by the Russians in the basement of the presbytery in Skorogoszcz. Greiner was killed because he didn't have the watch that a Soviet soldier demanded from him. In 1946, Wojaczek received a decree from the general superior of the congregation nominating him a provincial superior in Poland and the order to organize a province of the congregation.

== Imprisonment ==
For local representatives of the state authorities, Father Wojaczek was suspicious, especially because of his contacts with the religious headquarters located abroad. As a consequence, Wojaczek was arrested by the Department of Security in the fall of 1952. The prosecutor's case with reference number Pr II 15/53 was received by the office of the Opole Military Court on 2 March 1953, where it was given reference number Sr 28/53. Wojaczek was in custody since 28 September 1952. Ultimately, he was sentenced to six years in prison, loss of public and civil rights of honor for three years and the forfeiture of all property. Under the amnesty, the sentence was reduced to four years. The convict appealed against the sentence, but the Supreme Military Court upheld the sentence and the files were returned from Warsaw on 29 April 1953. Wojaczek was paroled on 18 March 1955.

After leaving prison, he returned to Narok, and then moved to Skorogoszcz. After unsuccessful attempts to cancel the sentence, he decided that his mission in Silesia was over and he decided to settle in West Germany. He died on 8 April 1993 in Reimlingen, at the age of 91.

== Bibliography ==
- Ratajczak, Dariusz (1994). Świadectwo księdza Wojaczka. Opole. OCLC 751316434.
- Gorczyńska, Anna. Narok od zarania po współczesność.
