= Chróścina =

Chróścina may refer to the following places in Poland:

- Chróścina, Lower Silesian Voivodeship (south-west Poland)
- Chróścina, Brzeg County in Opole Voivodeship (south-west Poland)
- Chróścina, Nysa County in Opole Voivodeship (south-west Poland)
- Chróścina, Opole County in Opole Voivodeship (south-west Poland)
