= Nowa Wieś Mała =

Nowa Wieś Mała may refer to the following places in Poland:

- Nowa Wieś Mała, Lower Silesian Voivodeship (south-west Poland)
- Nowa Wieś Mała, Gmina Grodków in Opole Voivodeship (south-west Poland)
- Nowa Wieś Mała, Gmina Lewin Brzeski in Opole Voivodeship (south-west Poland)
- Nowa Wieś Mała, Kętrzyn County in Warmian-Masurian Voivodeship (north Poland)
- Nowa Wieś Mała, Olsztyn County in Warmian-Masurian Voivodeship (north Poland)
