= Jasiona =

Jasiona may refer to the following places:

- Jasiona, Brzeg County in Opole Voivodeship (south-west Poland)
- Jasiona, Krapkowice County in Opole Voivodeship (south-west Poland)
- Jasiona, Silesian Voivodeship (south Poland)
- Jasiona, Prudnik County in Opole Voivodeship (south-west Poland)
