= Błażejowice =

Błażejowice may refer to the following places:

- Błażejowice, Brzeg County in Opole Voivodeship (south-west Poland)
- Błażejowice, Kędzierzyn-Koźle County in Opole Voivodeship (south-west Poland)
- Błażejowice, Silesian Voivodeship (south Poland)
