= Kantorowice =

Kantorowice may refer to the following places in Poland:

- Kantorowice, Opole Voivodeship
- Kantorowice, part of the Wzgórza Krzesławickie district of Kraków
