= Gmina Dąbrowa, Opole Voivodeship =

Gmina Dąbrowa Dąbrowa Commune
- Gmina
- Coat of arms
- Interactive map of Gmina Dąbrowa
- Coordinates (Dąbrowa): 50°40′54″N 17°44′47″E
- Country: Poland
- Voivodeship: Opole
- County: Opole
- Seat: Dąbrowa

Area
  - Total: 130.84 km^{2} (50.52 sq mi)

Population (2019-06-30)
  - Total: 8,231
  - Density: 62.91/km^{2} (162.9/sq mi)
- Website: http://gminadabrowa.pl/

Gmina Dąbrowa is a rural gmina (administrative district) in Opole County, Opole Voivodeship, in south-western Poland. Its seat is the village of Dąbrowa, which lies approximately 14 kilometres (9 mi) west of the regional capital Opole.

The gmina covers an area of 130.84 square kilometres (50.5 sq mi). As of 2019, its total population was 8,231.

The gmina contains part of the protected area called Stobrawa Landscape Park.

== Villages ==
Gmina Dąbrowa contains the villages and settlements of Chróścina, Ciepielowice, Dąbrowa, Karczów, Lipowa, Mechnice, Narok, Prądy, Siedliska, Skarbiszów, Sławice, Sokolniki, Wrzoski, Wyrębiny and Żelazna.

== Neighbouring gminas ==
Gmina Dąbrowa is bordered by the city of Opole and by the gminas of Dobrzeń Wielki, Komprachcice, Lewin Brzeski, Niemodlin, Popielów and Tułowice.

== Twin towns – sister cities ==
Gmina Dąbrowa is twinned with:

- Dąbrowa, Poland
- Halych, Ukraine
- Lengede, Germany
- Oravské Veselé, Slovakia
