= Sławice =

- Village
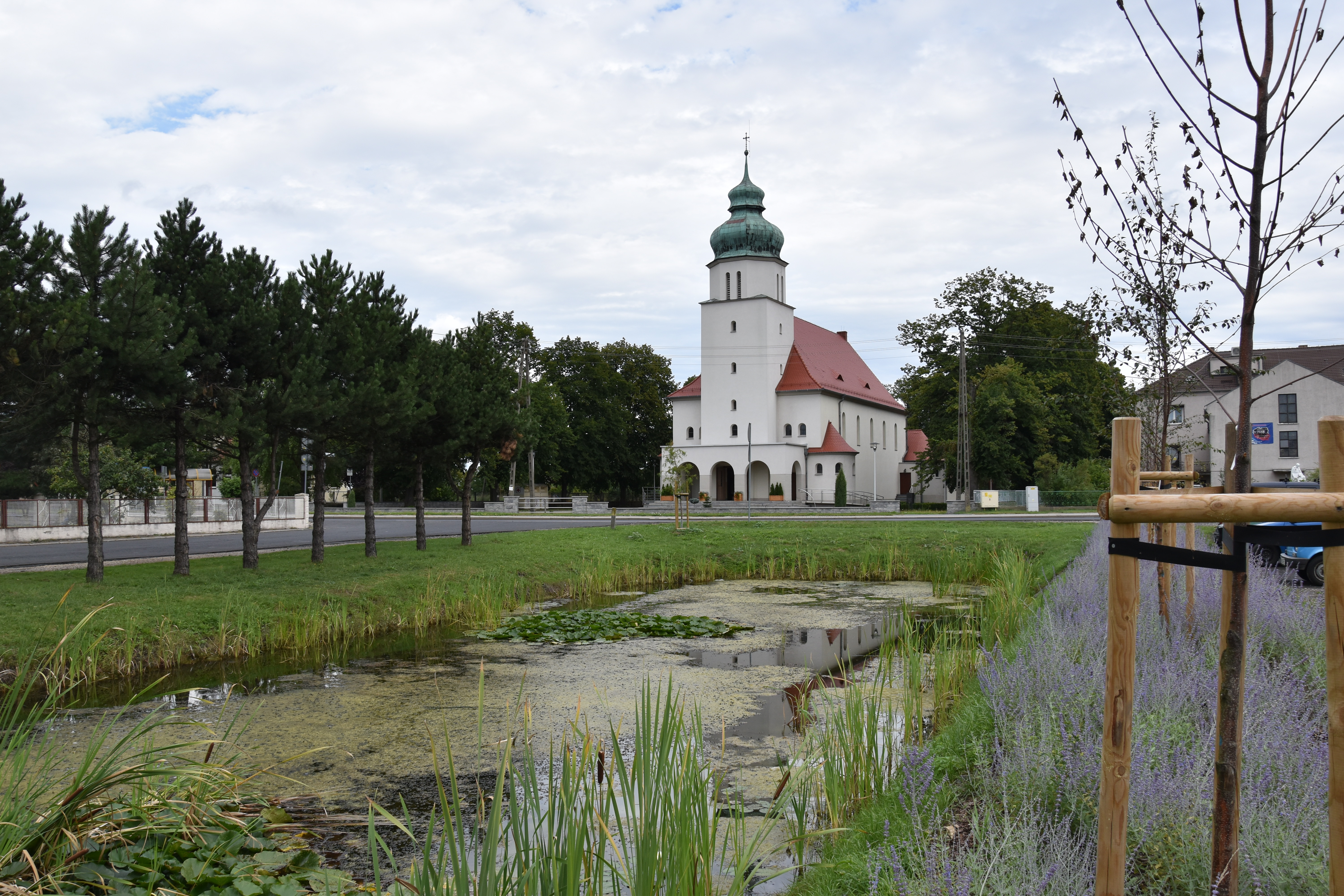

- Location within Poland
- Coordinates: 50°42′N 17°52′E
- Country: Poland
- Voivodeship: Opole
- County: Opole
- Gmina: Dąbrowa

Sławice [swaˈvit͡sɛ] (German Slawitz) is a village in the administrative district of Gmina Dąbrowa, within Opole County, Opole Voivodeship, in south-western Poland.

Between 1871 and 1945, the area was part of Germany. After the defeat of Nazi Germany in World War II, the village was reintegrated into Poland under the terms of the Potsdam Agreement.
