= Mechnice, Opole Voivodeship =

Mechnice
- Village
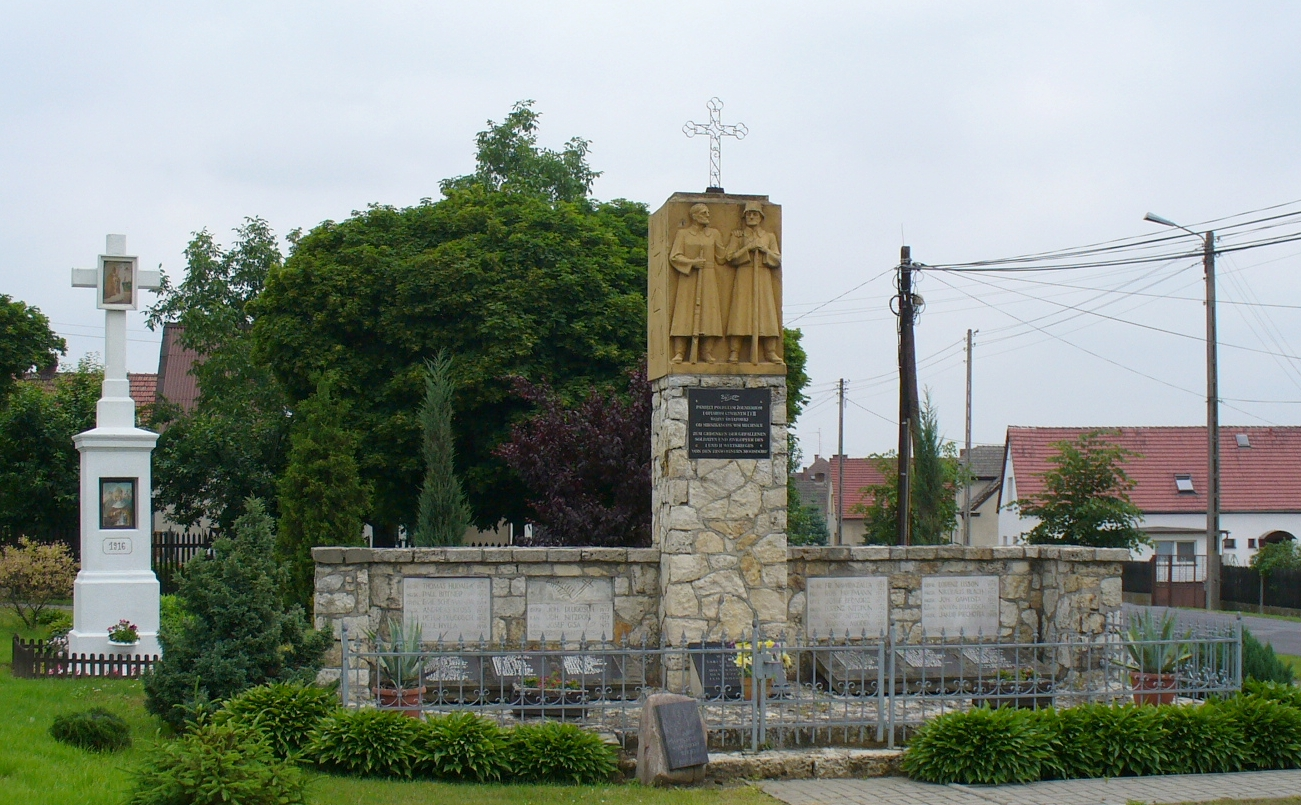

- Location within Poland
- Coordinates: 50°40′N 17°52′E
- Country: Poland
- Voivodeship: Opole
- County: Opole
- Gmina: Dąbrowa
- Population: 980

Mechnice [mɛxˈnit͡sɛ] is a village in the administrative district of Gmina Dąbrowa, within Opole County, Opole Voivodeship, in south-western Poland.
