= Wronów, Opole Voivodeship =

Wronów
- Village
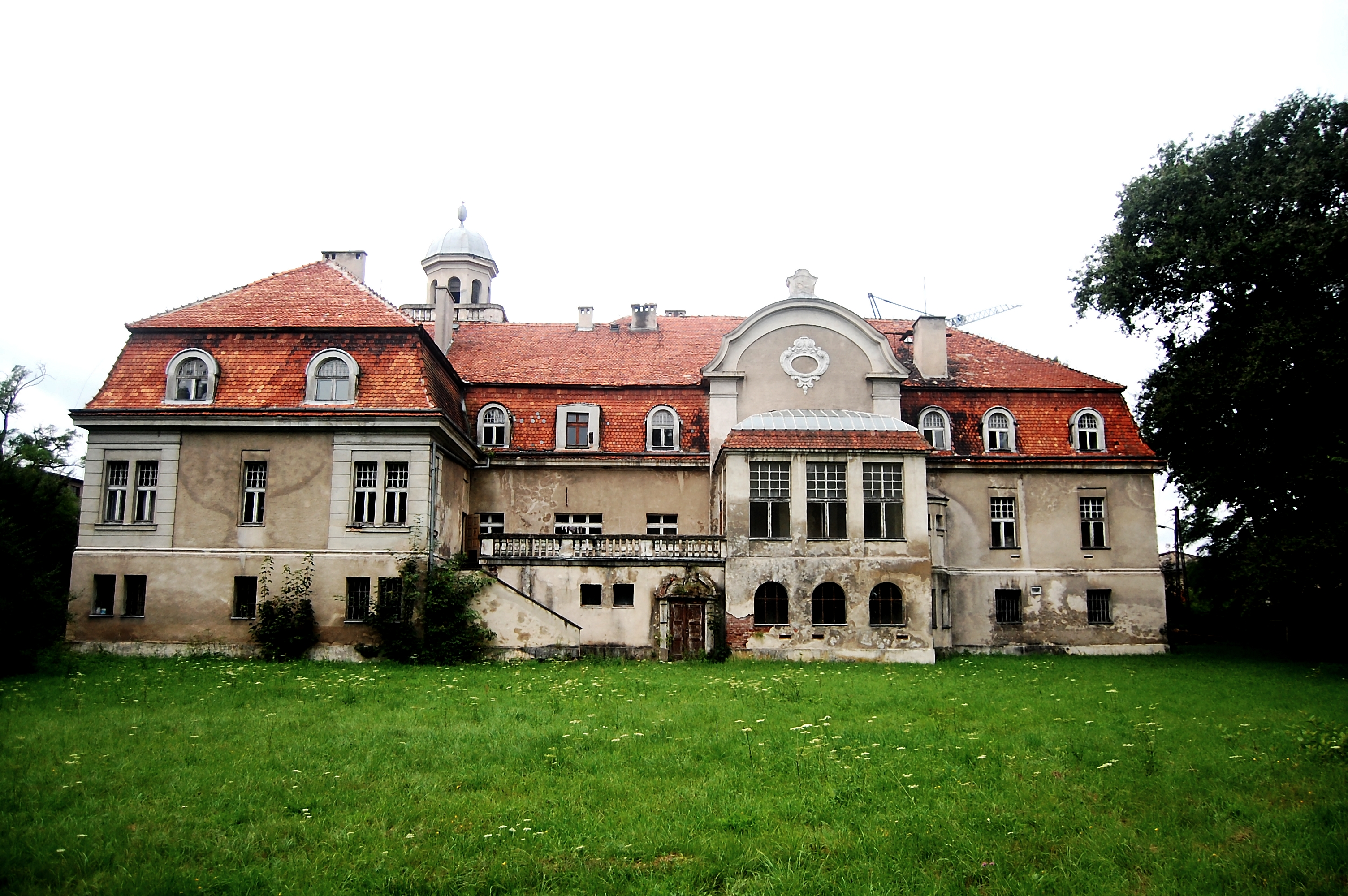
- Palace

- Location within Poland
- Coordinates: 50°47′16″N 17°39′53″E
- Country: Poland
- Voivodeship: Opole
- County: Brzeg
- Gmina: Lewin Brzeski

Wronów [ˈvrɔnuf] is a village in the administrative district of Gmina Lewin Brzeski, within Brzeg County, Opole Voivodeship, in south-western Poland.
