= Piaski, Opole Voivodeship =

Piaski
- Village
- Location within Poland
- Coordinates: 50°46′28″N 17°42′54″E
- Country: Poland
- Voivodeship: Opole
- County: Brzeg
- Gmina: Lewin Brzeski

Piaski (Polish pronunciation: [ˈpjaskʲi]) is a village in the administrative district of Gmina Lewin Brzeski, within Brzeg County, Opole Voivodeship, in south-western Poland.
