= Paul Diethei =

German politician

- Born: 26 June 1925; Reimlingen, Bavaria, Germany
- Died: 25 September 1997 (aged 72); Kempten, Bavaria, Germany
- Occupation: Politician
- Political party: Christian Social Union of Bavaria

Paul Diethei (26 June 1925 – 25 September 1997) was a German politician from the Christian Social Union of Bavaria. He was a member of the Landtag of Bavaria from 1966 to 1994.
