= Strzelniki, Opole Voivodeship =

Strzelniki
- Village
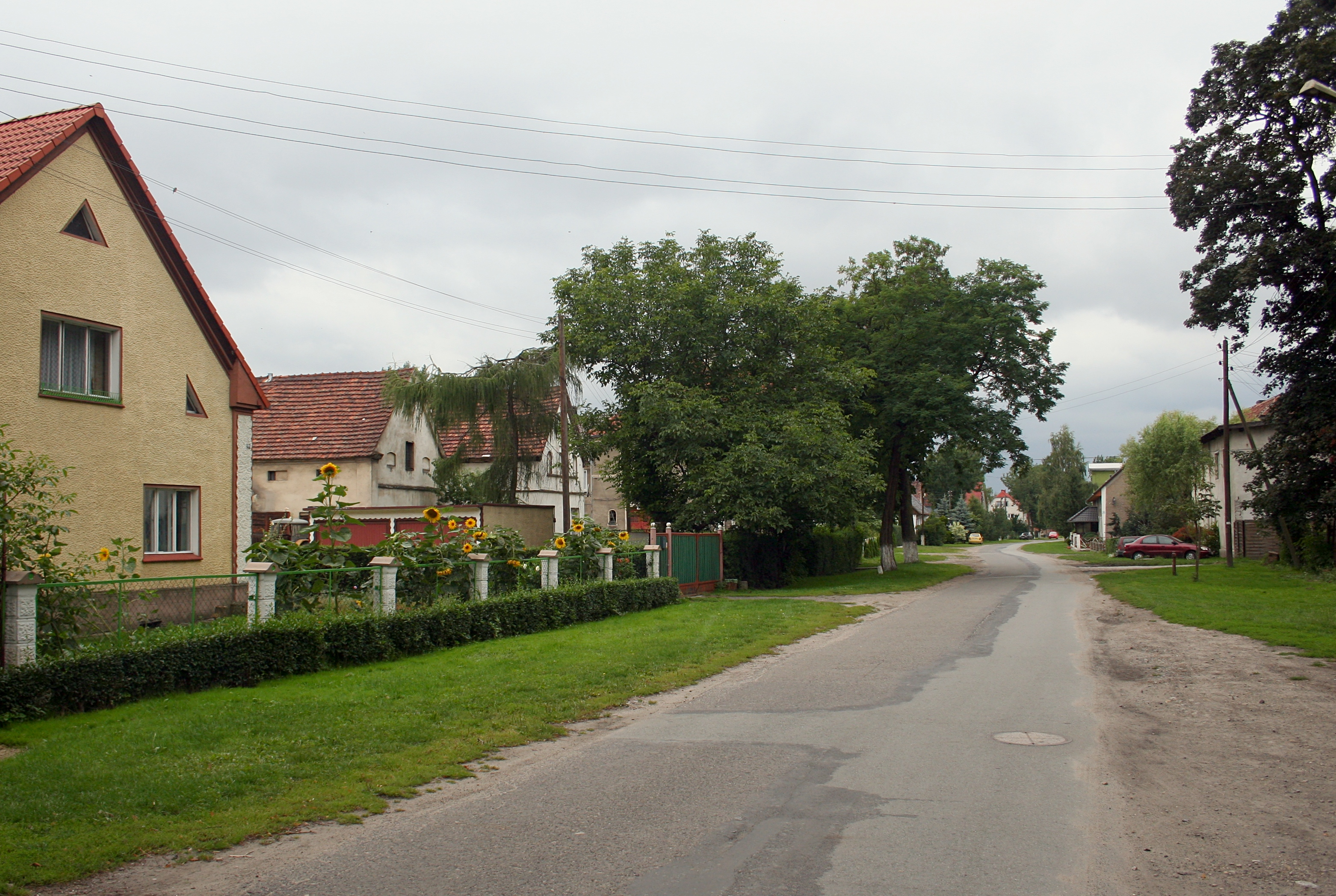

- Location within Poland
- Coordinates: 50°49′N 17°33′E
- Country: Poland
- Voivodeship: Opole
- County: Brzeg
- Gmina: Lewin Brzeski
- Population: 450

Strzelniki [stʂɛlˈniki] is a village in the administrative district of Gmina Lewin Brzeski, within Brzeg County, Opole Voivodeship, in south-western Poland.

The village is home to St. Anthony of Padua Church, exhibiting Medieval polychromes on the entire interior of the church.

== See also ==
- St. Anthony of Padua Church, Strzelniki
