= Ciepielowice =

- Village
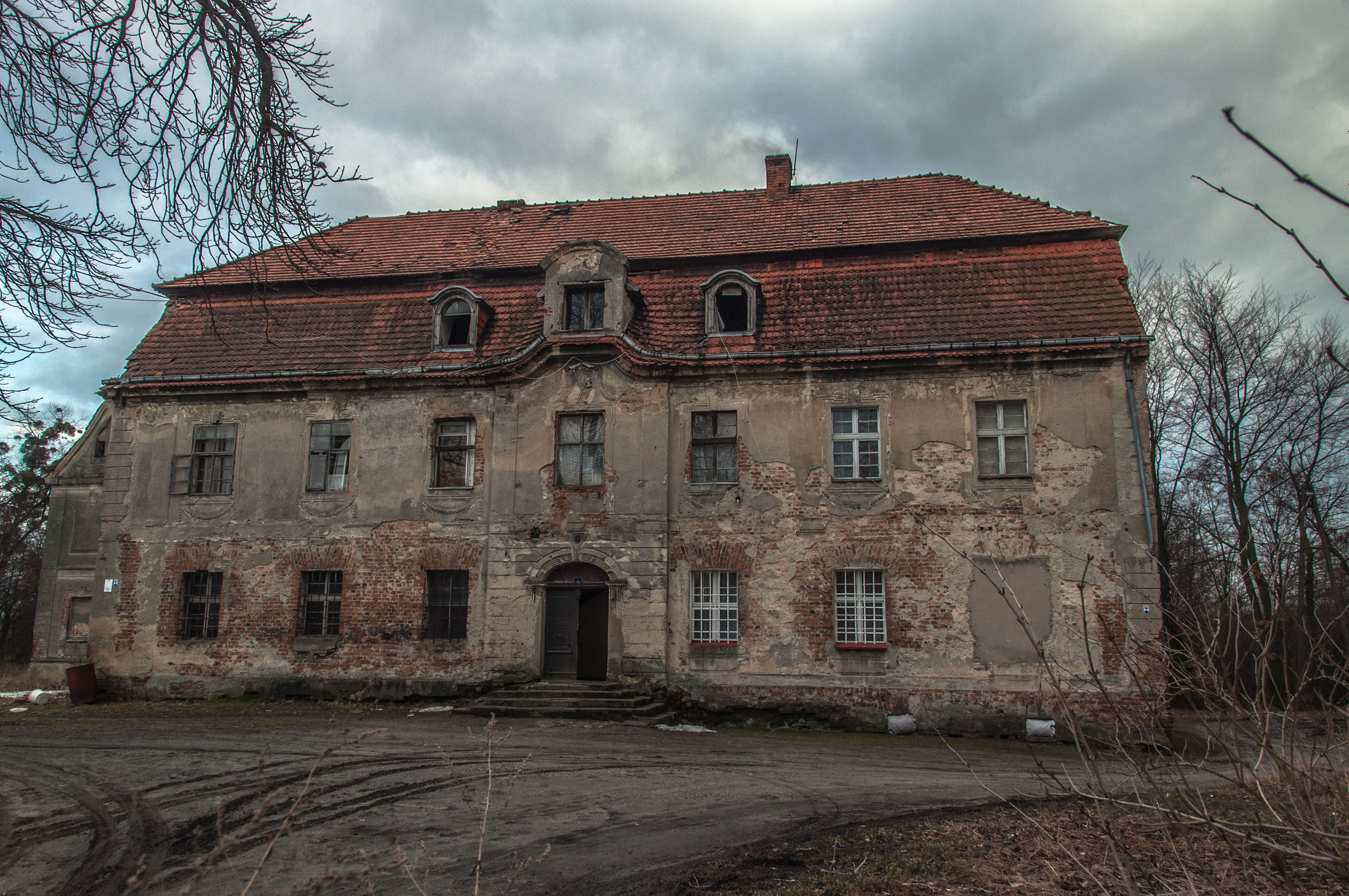
- Manor house

- Location within Poland
- Coordinates: 50°42′N 17°45′E
- Country: Poland
- Voivodeship: Opole
- County: Opole
- Gmina: Dąbrowa

Ciepielowice [t͡ɕɛpjɛlɔˈvit͡sɛ] (German Scheppelwitz) is a village in the administrative district of Gmina Dąbrowa, within Opole County, Opole Voivodeship, in south-western Poland.
