= Gmina Lewin Brzeski =

Gmina Lewin Brzeski Lewin Brzeski Commune
- Gmina
- Flag Coat of arms
- Interactive map of Gmina Lewin Brzeski
- Coordinates (Lewin Brzeski): 50°44′59″N 17°37′8″E
- Country: Poland
- Voivodeship: Opole
- County: Brzeg
- Seat: Lewin Brzeski

Area
  - Total: 159.7 km^{2} (61.7 sq mi)

Population (2019-06-30)
  - Total: 12,968
  - Density: 81.20/km^{2} (210.3/sq mi)
  - Urban: 5,736
  - Rural: 7,232
- Website: http://lewin-brzeski.pl

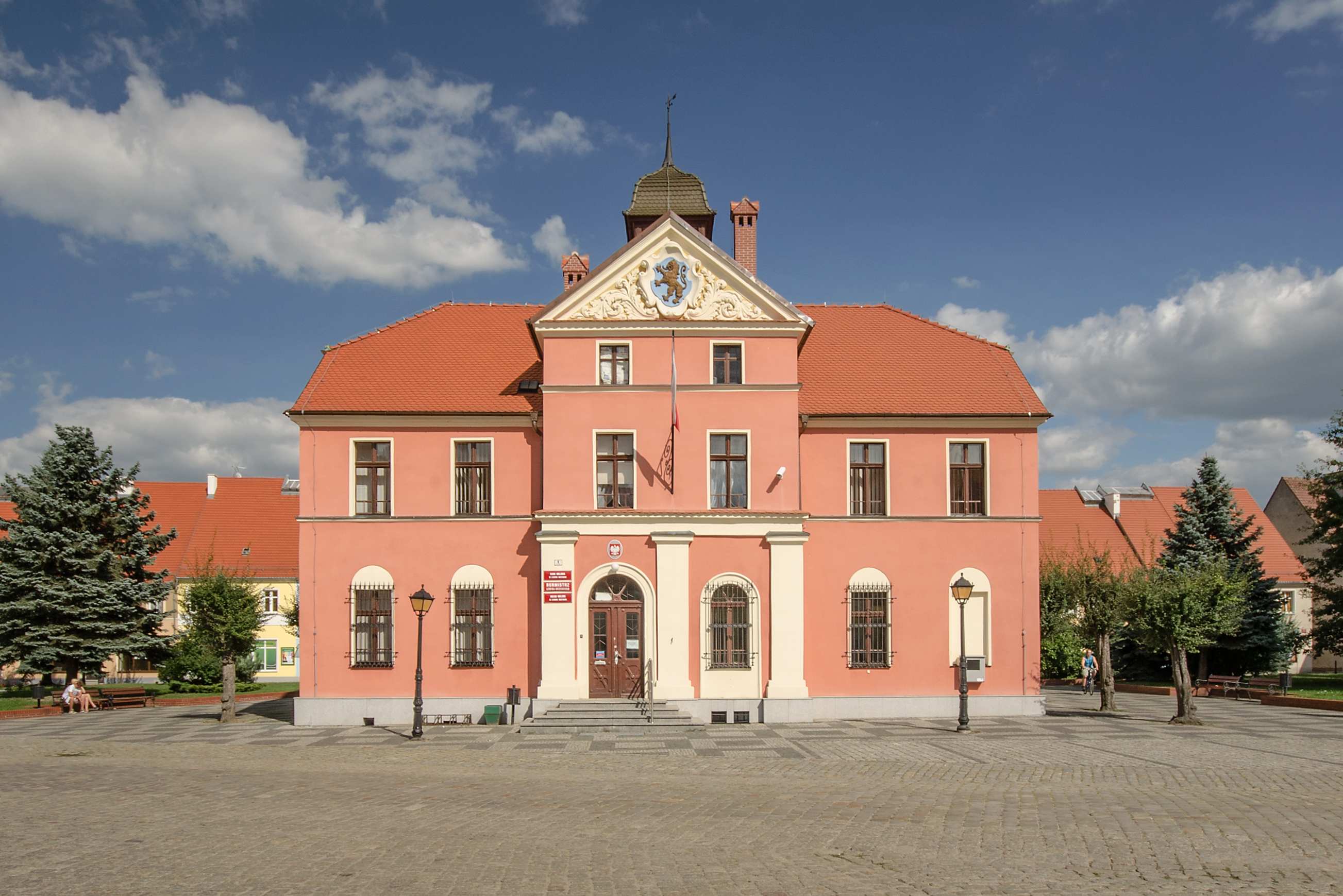
Lowin Brzeski Löwen rathaus

Gmina Lewin Brzeski is an urban-rural gmina (administrative district) in Brzeg County, Opole Voivodeship, in south-western Poland. Its seat is the town of Lewin Brzeski, which lies approximately 17 kilometres (11 mi) south-east of Brzeg and 25 km (16 mi) north-west of the regional capital Opole.

The gmina covers an area of 159.7 square kilometres (61.7 sq mi), and as of 2019 its total population is 12,968.

The gmina contains part of the protected area called Stobrawa Landscape Park.

== Villages ==
Apart from the town of Lewin Brzeski, Gmina Lewin Brzeski contains the villages and settlements of Błażejowice, Borkowice, Buszyce, Chróścina, Golczowice, Jasiona, Kantorowice, Leśniczówka, Łosiów, Mikolin, Niwa, Nowa Wieś Mała, Oldrzyszowice, Piaski, Przecza, Ptakowice, Raski, Różyna, Sarny Małe, Skorogoszcz, Stroszowice, Strzelniki and Wronów.

== Neighbouring gminas ==
Gmina Lewin Brzeski is bordered by the gminas of Dąbrowa, Niemodlin, Olszanka, Popielów and Skarbimierz.

== Twin towns – sister cities ==
Gmina Lewin Brzeski is twinned with:

- Szegvár, Hungary
