= Ryszard Bender =

Polish politician and historian

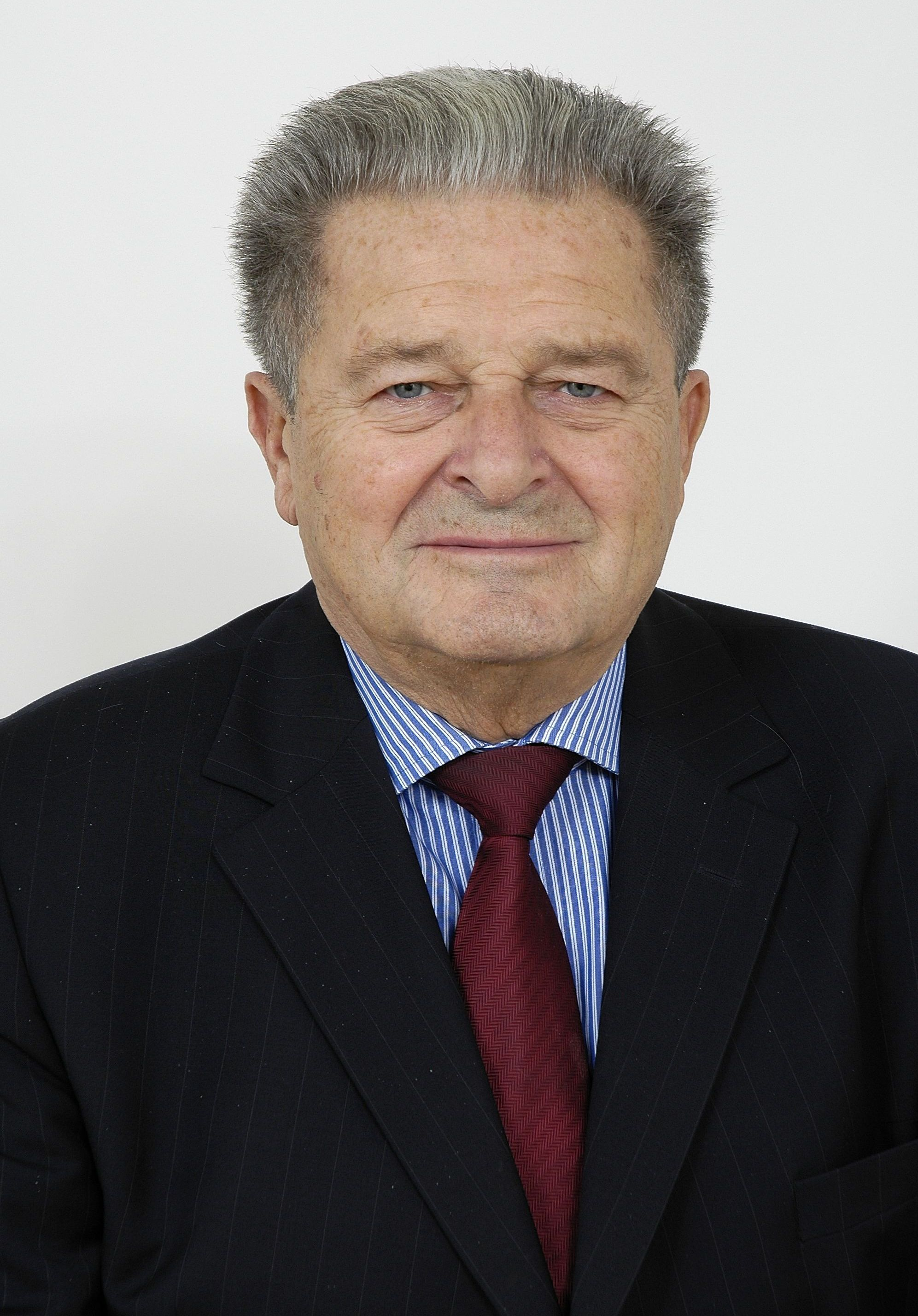
- Ryszard Bender
- Born: Ryszard Janusz Bender; 16 February 1932; Łomża, Białystok Voivodeship, Poland
- Died: 24 February 2016 (aged 84); Lublin, Poland
- Occupations: Polish historian and politician

Ryszard Janusz Bender (16 February 1932 – 24 February 2016) was a Polish right-wing politician and historian. He is noted for his characterization of Auschwitz as a "labour camp", attracting allegations of Holocaust denial.

== Career ==
He was professor of History at John Paul II Catholic University of Lublin. From 1976 to 1980 and from 1985 to 1989, he was a deputy of the Sejm. He continued to be a senator in post-Communist Poland from 1991 to 1993 and from 2005 to 2007. He was one of the co-founders of the League of Polish Families, a far-right party. In 2007, he won election to the Senate from the Law and Justice Party, becoming the oldest member.

=== Characterization of Auschwitz and Holocaust denial ===
In January 2000, Bender took part in a show on Radio Maryja — a socially conservative radio station — to defend Dariusz Ratajczak, a Polish historian, who was convicted of the denial of Holocaust for arguing that the Auschwitz Gas Chambers were meant to disinfect the Jews than to kill them among other things. Speaking on the occasion, Bender characterized Auschwitz as "not a death camp [but] a labour camp" where the "labour was not always hard"; he claimed that the Jews were not only well-fed but also occupied significant positions in the camp administration. He concluded that the "Jewish lobby" was persecuting Ratajczak.

The remarks attracted immediate ire from various quarters including Catholic Bishops who demanded an unconditional apology, his university which initiated disciplinary proceedings, and survivors of concentration camps; in what was a "national scandal", he was accused of engaging in antisemitism and Holocaust denial. Legal proceedings were initiated at a court in Torun but the case was dismissed. In response, Bender complained about the legal provisions on Holocaust denial being weaponized by fundamentalist Jews to appropriate the Auschwitz only for their own; he also cited the sacrosanctity of academic freedom. A decade later, Bender claimed that his remarks were taken out of context.

Brian Porter-Szucs, a historian of Polish nationalism at University of Michigan, notes that Bender advocated an ahistorical about view about how the Nazis did not intend to particularly target the Jews but rather assault Poland and God.

=== Jedwabne Pogrom ===
While campaigning for the 2001 elections, Bender denied Polish culpability in the Jedwabne pogrom.

== Personal life and death ==
Bender has a daughter - Bogna Bender, a journalist for TVP Lublin.

=== Death ===
He died from stroke on February 24, 2016 in Lublin, Poland. At age of 84.
