= Mikolin =

- Village
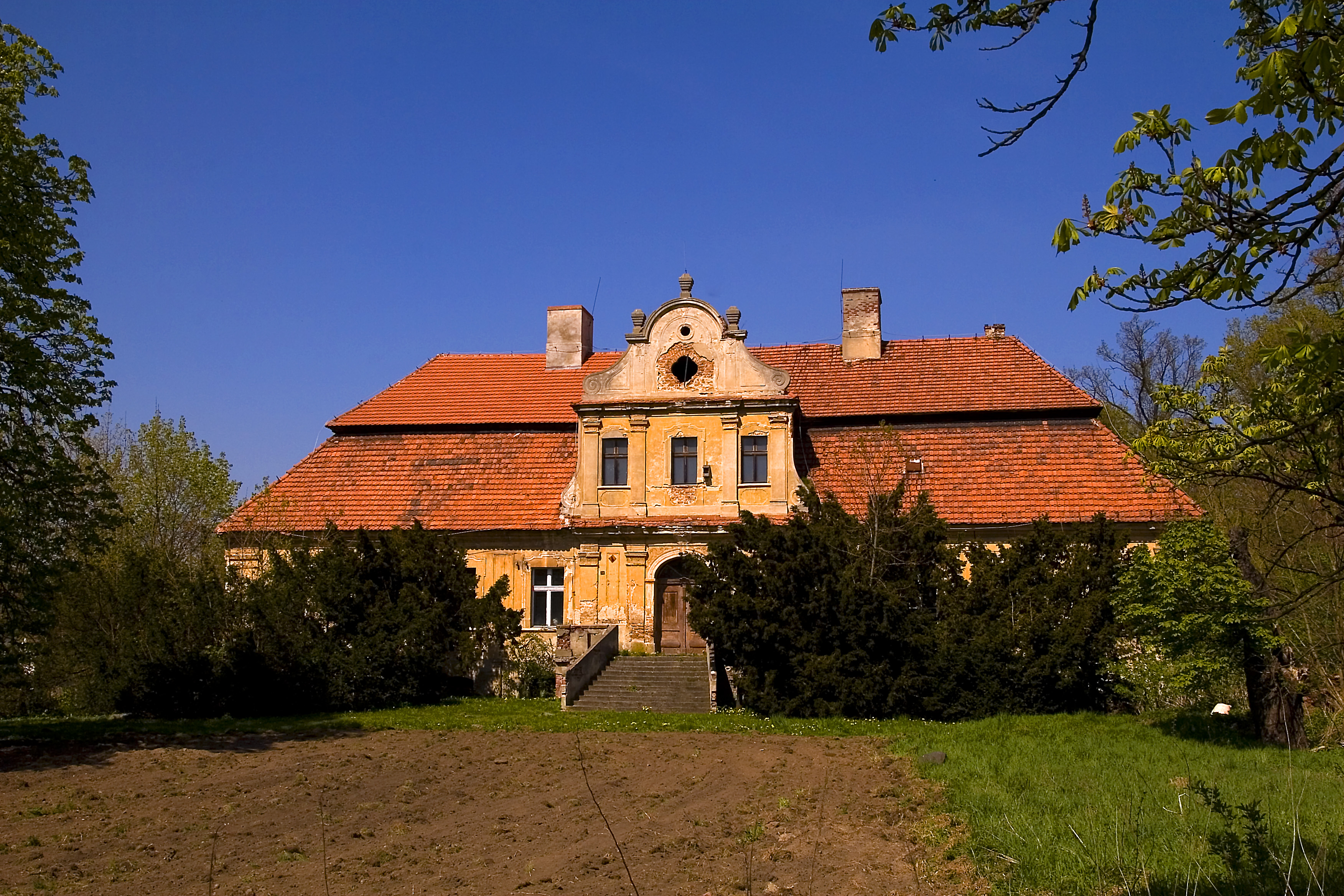
- Old manor house in Mikolin

- Location within Poland
- Coordinates: 50°48′N 17°42′E
- Country: Poland
- Voivodeship: Opole
- County: Brzeg
- Gmina: Lewin Brzeski

Population (approx.)
  - Total: 320
- Time zone: UTC+1 (CET)
  - Summer (DST): UTC+2 (CEST)
- Vehicle registration: OB

Mikolin [miˈkɔlin] is a village in the administrative district of Gmina Lewin Brzeski, within Brzeg County, Opole Voivodeship, in south-western Poland.

The name of the village comes from the name Mikołaj (Nicholas).

During World War II, on 21 January 1945, a German-organized death march of Allied prisoners of war from the Stalag Luft 7 POW camp passed through the village.
