= Borkowice, Brzeg County =

Borkowice
- Village
- Location within Poland
- Coordinates: 50°44′N 17°43′E
- Country: Poland
- Voivodeship: Opole
- County: Brzeg
- Gmina: Lewin Brzeski

Borkowice [bɔrkɔˈvit͡sɛ] is a village in the administrative district of Gmina Lewin Brzeski, within Brzeg County, Opole Voivodeship, in south-western Poland.
