= Dąbrowa, Opole County =

Dąbrowa
- Village
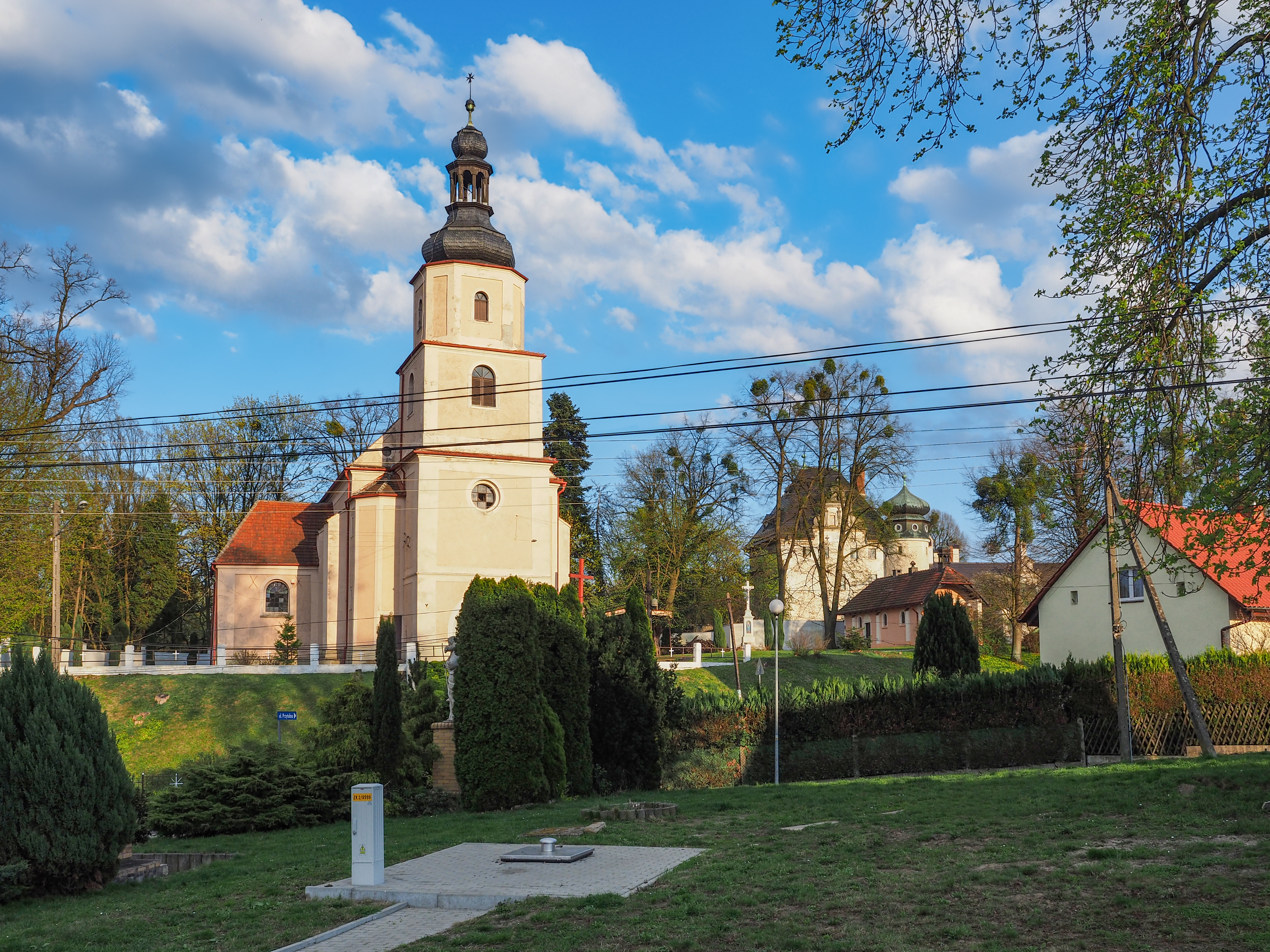
- St. Lawrence's Church, 2018

- Location within Poland
- Coordinates: 50°40′54″N 17°44′47″E
- Country: Poland
- Voivodeship: Opole
- County: Opole
- Gmina: Dąbrowa
- Population: 1,100

Dąbrowa [dɔmˈbrɔva] is a village in Opole County, Opole Voivodeship, in south-western Poland. It is the seat of the gmina (administrative district) called Gmina Dąbrowa.
