= Ptakowice, Opole Voivodeship =

Ptakowice
- Village
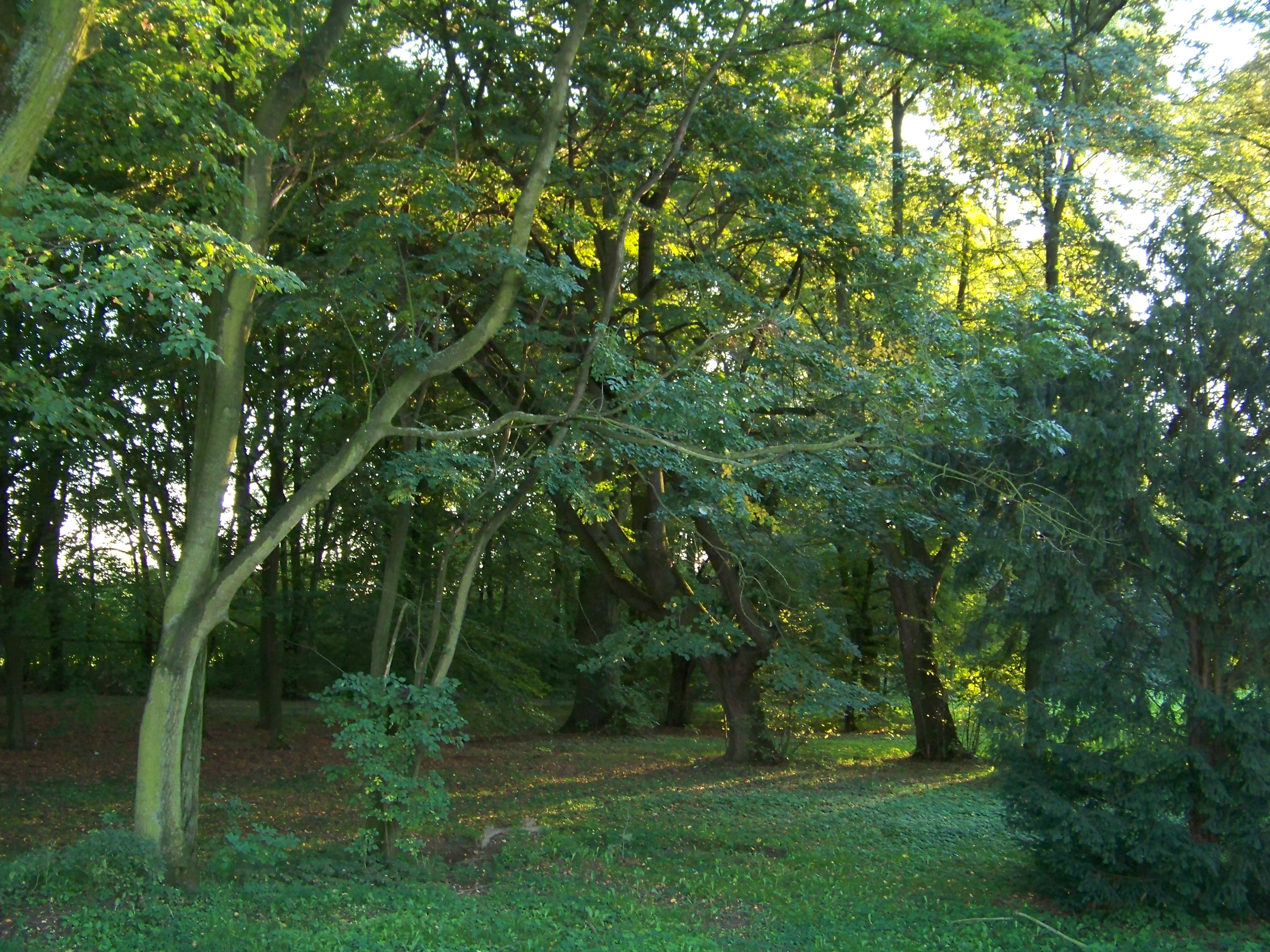
- Park in Ptakowice

- Location within Poland
- Coordinates: 50°45′N 17°33′E
- Country: Poland
- Voivodeship: Opole
- County: Brzeg
- Gmina: Lewin Brzeski
- Time zone: UTC+1 (CET)
  - Summer (DST): UTC+2 (CEST)
- Postal code: 49-340
- Vehicle registration: OB

Ptakowice [ptakɔˈvit͡sɛ] is a village in the administrative district of Gmina Lewin Brzeski, within Brzeg County, Opole Voivodeship, in south-western Poland.

The name of the village is of Polish origin and comes from the word ptak, which means "bird".

== Transport ==
The Voivodeship road 458 runs through Ptakowice and the A4 motorway runs nearby, south of the village.
