= Dariusz Ratajczak =

Polish historian

- Born: 28 November 1962; Opole, Poland
- Died: May-June 2010 (age 48); Opole, Poland
- Occupations: Historian; publicist; activist

Dariusz Ratajczak (28 November 1962 – 2010) was a Polish historian (formerly of the University of Opole), publicist and right-wing activist. In 1999, he was convicted of Holocaust denial in Poland (the case was upheld on appeal in 2001).

== Biography ==
Ratajczak was born in Opole, Upper Silesia, Poland. His father, Cyryl, moved from Greater Poland to Opole after finishing Law studies. His mother, Alina Czuchryj, was born in Chodorów (then in Poland). Dariusz Ratajczak finished Opole high school and enrolled to Adam Mickiewicz University in Poznań. From 1988 Ratajczak was working in a higher education institution in Opole, later changed to University of Opole, as a history lecturer until 1999. In that year he was dismissed following the controversy about his book Dangerous Topics, in which he asserted that the gas chambers at Auschwitz were used only to delouse the prisoners. He had also published articles in right-wing magazines Myśl Polska and Najwyższy Czas!.

== Holocaust denial ==
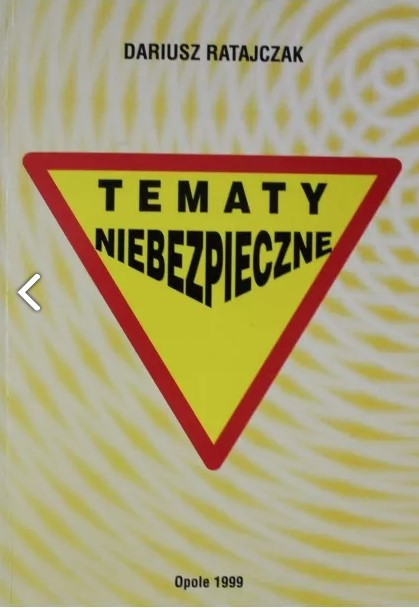
Cover of the book Tematy Niebezpieczne ("Dangerous Topics")

According to Ruth E. Gruber report, Dariusz Ratajczak, in his book Tematy Niebezpieczne ("Dangerous Topics"), appeared to agree with Holocaust deniers, who claimed that for technical reasons it was not possible to kill millions of people in the Nazi gas chambers, that Zyklon B gas was used only for disinfecting, that there was no Nazi plan for the systematic murder of Jews and that a majority of Holocaust scholars "are adherents of a religion of the Holocaust". Rajtaczak would defend himself claiming that he only quoted the Holocaust deniers' claims to illustrate their point of view, but did not endorse them.

Ratajczak's book triggered widespread public criticism and drew protests from numerous sources, including the director of the museum at the former Auschwitz death camp, senator Władysław Bartoszewski, the mainstream Polish academic community and the bishop of Lublin.

The University of Opole suspended Dariusz Ratajczak from teaching in 1999. In the same year he was taken to court, as denying the existence of the Holocaust was a criminal offence in Poland. In December 1999 the local court in Opole found Ratajczak guilty of breaching the Institute of National Remembrance law that outlawed the denial of crimes against humanity committed by the Nazi or communist regimes in Poland, but that his crime had caused "negligible harm to society", and the court sentenced him to a year's probation. The reason for the low sentence was that Ratajczak's self-published book had only 230 copies and that in the second edition and in his public appearances he criticized the Holocaust denial.

The verdict was criticized by some, including former victims of Nazi crimes, as too lenient. Ratajczak was defended by one of the leaders of the League of Polish Families party, Ryszard Bender, who, during a Radio Maria broadcast, denied that Auschwitz had been a death camp, his denial causing another scandal in Poland.

In 2000 he became a European Associate of the Adelaide Institute, Australia. In April 2000 Ratajczak was fired from the University of Opole for ethics violations and was banned for three years from teaching at other universities. During that time, he worked as a storeman.

Ratajczak remained defiant and denied all charges, appealing for an outright acquittal; his critics also appealed demanding a harsher sentence, including a prison term. Eventually, after a series of appeals, the verdict was upheld in 2001.

Ratajczak's book has been described as having involved the first serious case of Holocaust denial in Poland (though there have been other similar cases). Ratajczak revised his book in 2005, attributing the claims regarding Zyklon B to historical revisionists.

== Death ==
Dariusz Ratajczak was found dead in a car parked near the shopping centre in Opole on 11 June 2010. The body was lying in the car for nearly two weeks and was in an advanced state of decay. The autopsy discovered that fatal alcohol poisoning was the cause of Ratajczak's death. He was buried at the municipal cemetery in Półwieś, Opole. The inscription on his tomb states his death date as 29 May 2010.

== Political activity ==
In 2002 Ratajczak was considered as a candidate of the League of Polish Families for the Opole's voivodeship sejmik, but after his candidature caused controversy he resigned from running for the office.

== Works ==
- Polacy na Wileńszczyźnie 1939-1944 (Opole 1990)
- Świadectwo księdza Wojaczka (Opole 1994) (Note: About Józef Wojaczek, Polish Roman Catholic Priest, member of the Mariannhill Missionaries.)
- Krajowa Armia Podziemna w powiecie prudnickim 1949-1952 (co-author, Opole-Gliwice 1996) (Note: About Underground Home Army, Polish military anticommunist organization that operated in the region of Prudnik)
- Tematy niebezpieczne (Opole 1999)
- Tematy jeszcze bardziej niebezpieczne (Kociaty, New York, 2001)
- Inkwizycja po polsku, czyli sprawa dr Dariusza Ratajczaka (Poznań 2003)
- Prawda ponad wszystko (Opole 2004)
- Spowiedź "antysemity" (Opole 2005)
