= Buszyce, Opole Voivodeship =

Buszyce
- Village
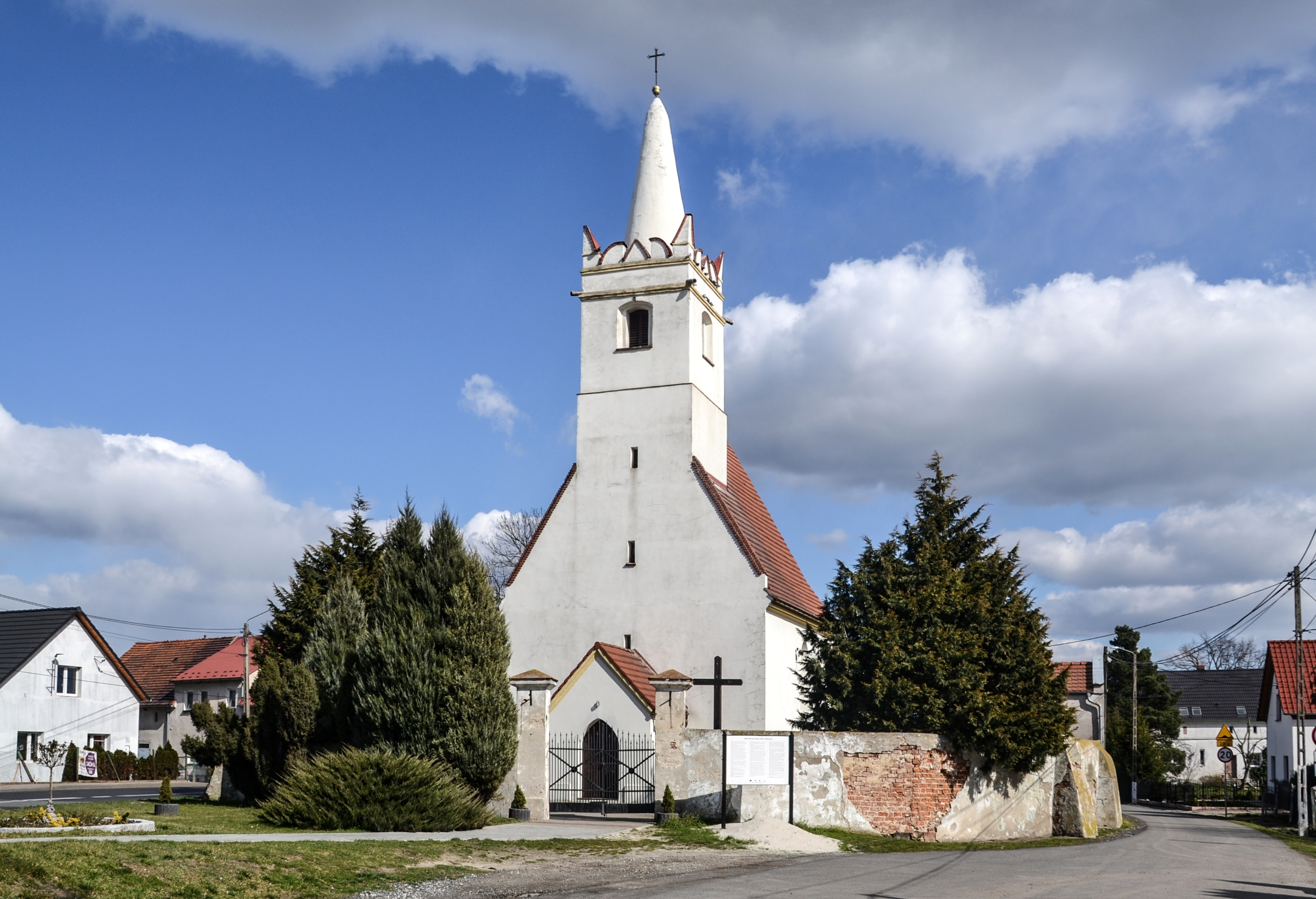
- Holy Trinity Church

- Location within Poland
- Coordinates: 50°46′N 17°38′E
- Country: Poland
- Voivodeship: Opole
- County: Brzeg
- Gmina: Lewin Brzeski
- Time zone: UTC+1 (CET)
  - Summer (DST): UTC+2 (CEST)
- Vehicle registration: OB

Buszyce [buˈʂɨt͡sɛ] is a village in the administrative district of Gmina Lewin Brzeski, within Brzeg County, Opole Voivodeship, in south-western Poland.

== History ==
In the final stages of World War II, a German-organized death march of Allied prisoners of war from the Stalag Luft 7 POW camp passed through the village on 21 January 1945.
