= Leśniczówka, Opole Voivodeship =

Leśniczówka
- Settlement
- Location within Poland
- Coordinates: 50°46′45″N 17°35′53″E
- Country: Poland
- Voivodeship: Opole
- County: Brzeg
- Gmina: Lewin Brzeski

Leśniczówka ([lɛɕɲiˈtʂufka]) is a settlement in the administrative district of Gmina Lewin Brzeski, within Brzeg County, Opole Voivodeship, in south-western Poland.
