= Stroszowice =

- Village
- Location within Poland
- Coordinates: 50°43′51″N 17°35′31″E
- Country: Poland
- Voivodeship: Opole
- County: Brzeg
- Gmina: Lewin Brzeski

Stroszowice [strɔʂɔˈvit͡sɛ] is a village in the administrative district of Gmina Lewin Brzeski, within Brzeg County, Opole Voivodeship, in south-western Poland.
