= St. Anthony of Padua Church, Strzelniki =

Coordinates: 50.8167°N 17.5500°E

St. Anthony of Padua Church
- Kościół Świętych Apostołów Piotra i Pawła
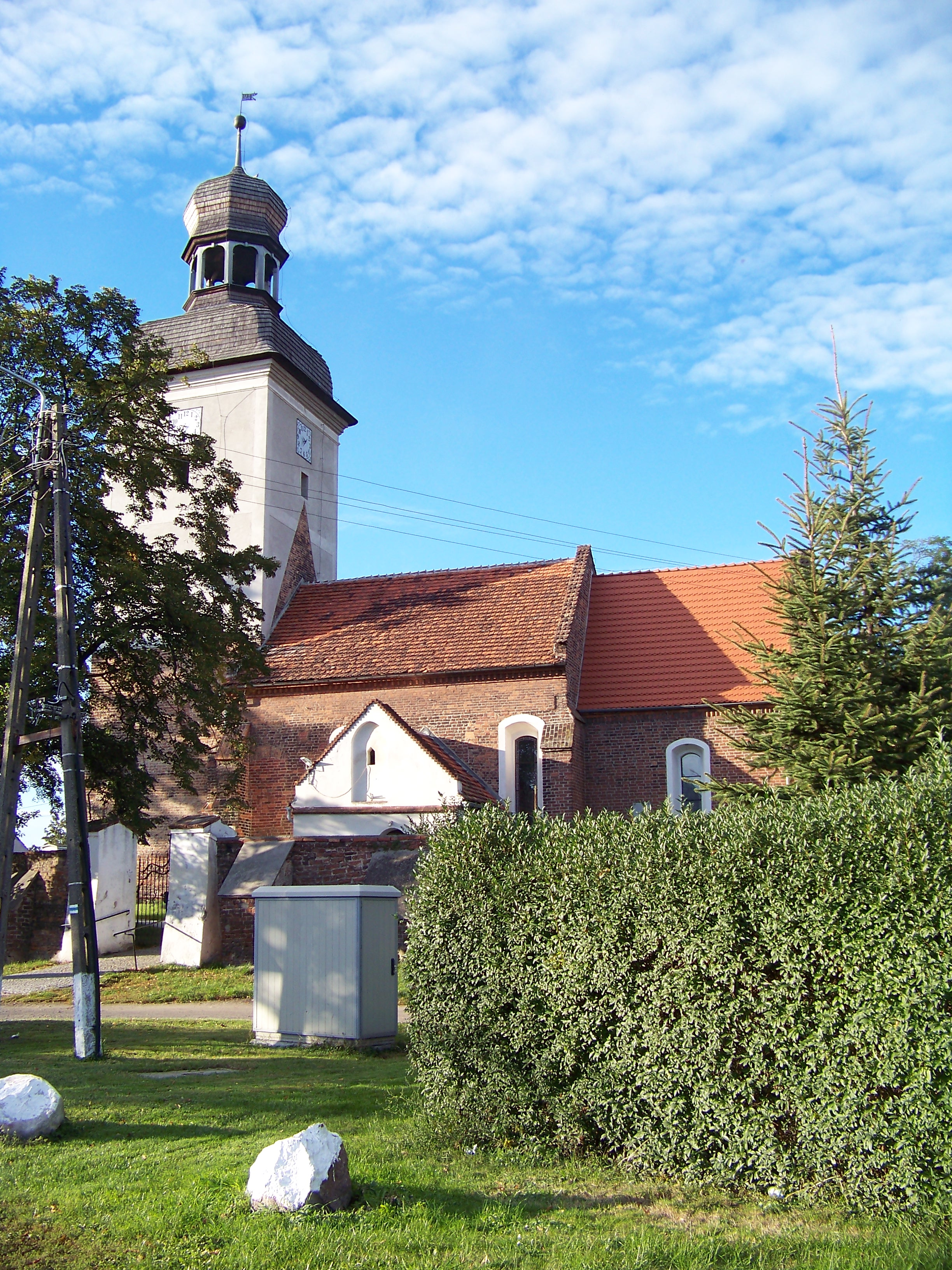
- St. Anthony of Padua Church
- St. Anthony of Padua Church
- Location: Strzelniki
- Country: Poland
- Denomination: Roman Catholic

Architecture
- Style: Renaissance
- Completed: c.1376, 1688

Administration
- Archdiocese: Roman Catholic Archdiocese of Wrocław

St. Anthony of Padua Church in Strzelniki, Poland, is a historic Renaissance fourteenth-century church. St. Anthony of Padua's Church (formerly St. Lawrence) was first mentioned in 1376. The present church was built in 1688, with the 1853 renovation restructuring its oval-cut windows. During renovations that took place in 1958, Medieval polychromes were discovered, that were later uncovered and exhibited between 1966 and 1979. The polychromes cover the entire interior of the church.
