= Żelazna, Opole County =

Żelazna
- Village
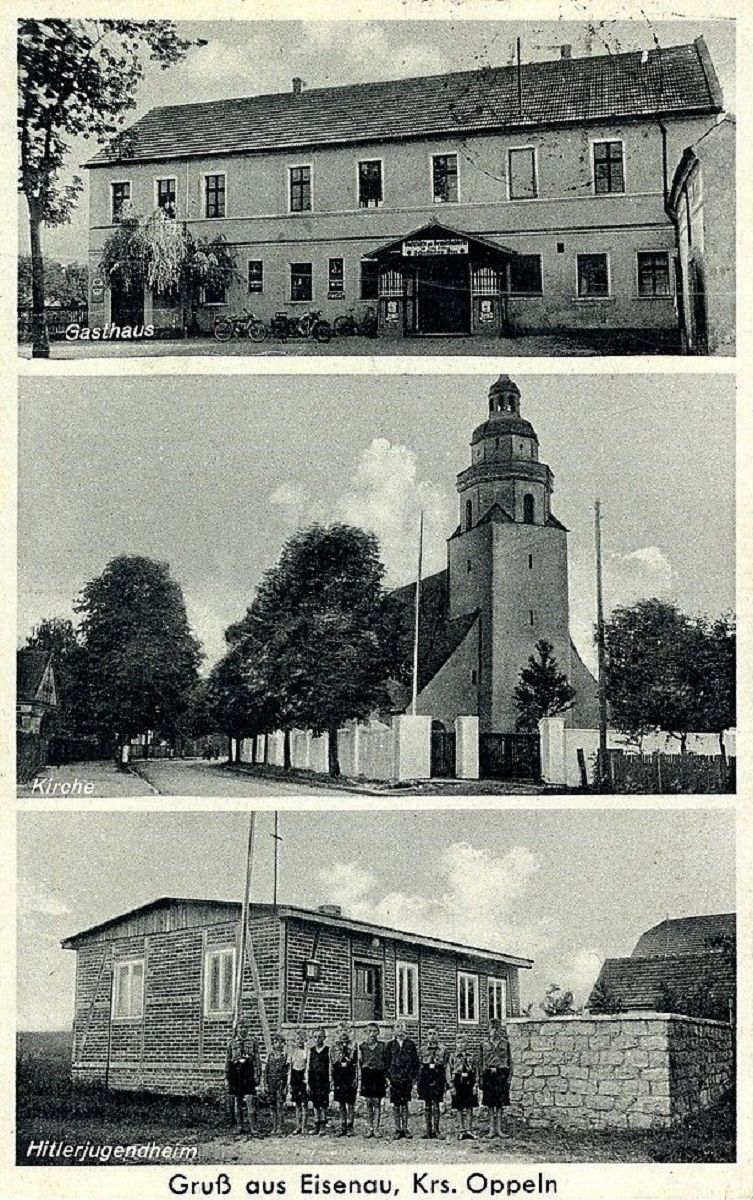

- Location within Poland
- Coordinates: 50°43′45″N 17°51′0″E
- Country: Poland
- Voivodeship: Opole
- County: Opole
- Gmina: Dąbrowa

Żelazna [ʐɛˈlazna] (German: Eisenau) is a village in the administrative district of Gmina Dąbrowa, within Opole County, Opole Voivodeship, in south-western Poland.
