= Karczów, Opole Voivodeship =

Karczów
- Village
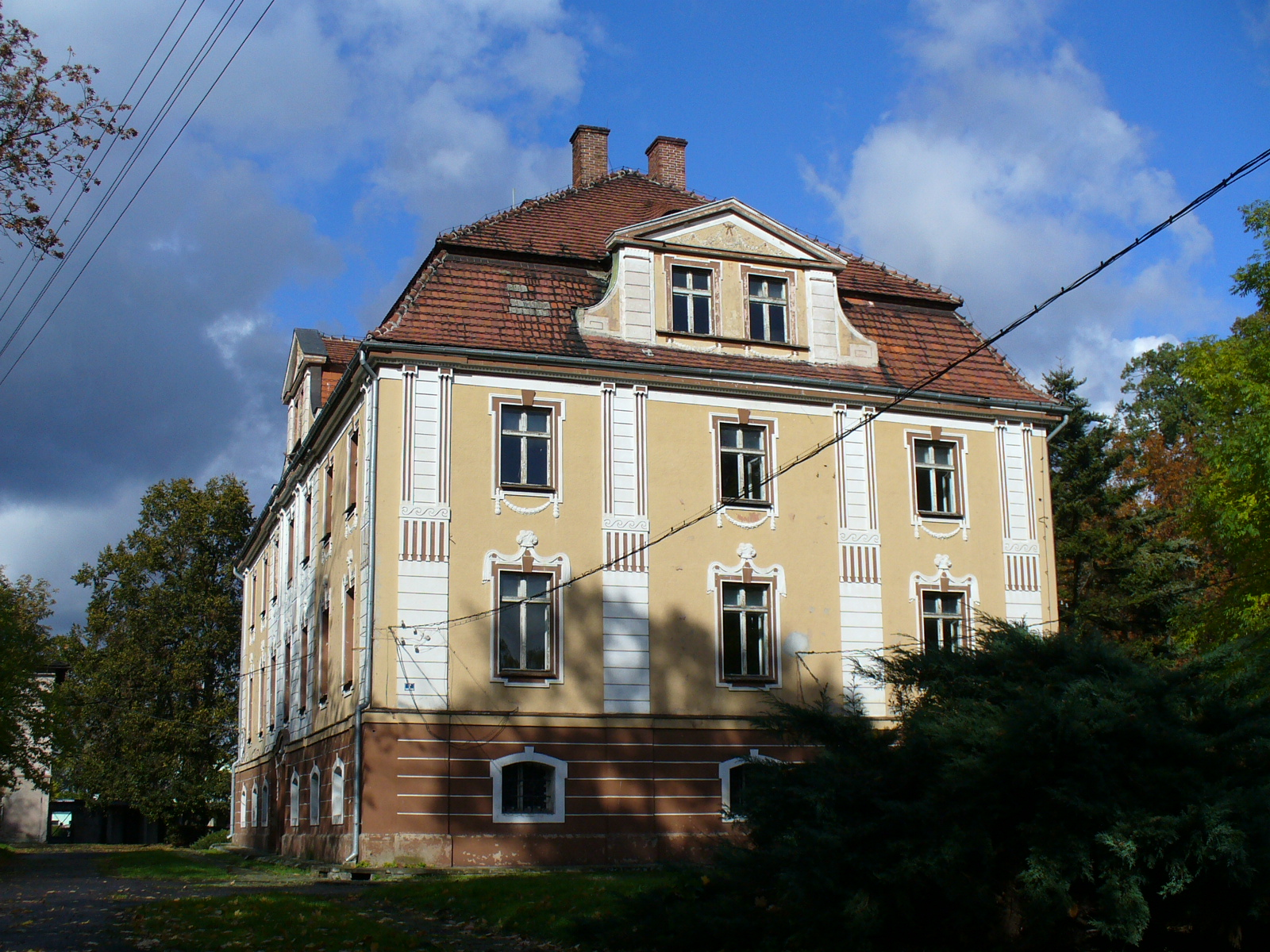
- Palace

- Location within Poland
- Coordinates: 50°42′N 17°47′E
- Country: Poland
- Voivodeship: Opole
- County: Opole
- Gmina: Dąbrowa

Karczów [ˈkart͡ʂuf] (German Schönwitz) is a village in the administrative district of Gmina Dąbrowa in Opole County, Opole Voivodeship in southwestern Poland.
