= Lipowa, Opole County =

Lipowa
- Village
- Location within Poland
- Coordinates: 50°42′N 17°40′E
- Country: Poland
- Voivodeship: Opole
- County: Opole
- Gmina: Dąbrowa

Lipowa [liˈpɔva] is a village in the administrative district of Gmina Dąbrowa, within Opole County, Opole Voivodeship, in south-western Poland.
