= Niwa, Opole Voivodeship =

Niwa
- Village
- Location within Poland
- Coordinates: 50°43′59″N 17°42′3″E
- Country: Poland
- Voivodeship: Opole
- County: Brzeg
- Gmina: Lewin Brzeski

Niwa [ˈɲiva] is a village in the administrative district of Gmina Lewin Brzeski, within Brzeg County, Opole Voivodeship, in south-western Poland.
