= Sokolniki, Opole Voivodeship =

Sokolniki
- Settlement
- Location within Poland
- Coordinates: 50°40′14″N 17°44′56″E
- Country: Poland
- Voivodeship: Opole
- County: Opole
- Gmina: Dąbrowa

Sokolniki [sɔkɔlˈɲikʲi] (German Sokollnik) is a settlement in the administrative district of Gmina Dąbrowa, within Opole County, Opole Voivodeship, in south-western Poland.
