= Różyna, Opole Voivodeship =

Różyna
- Village
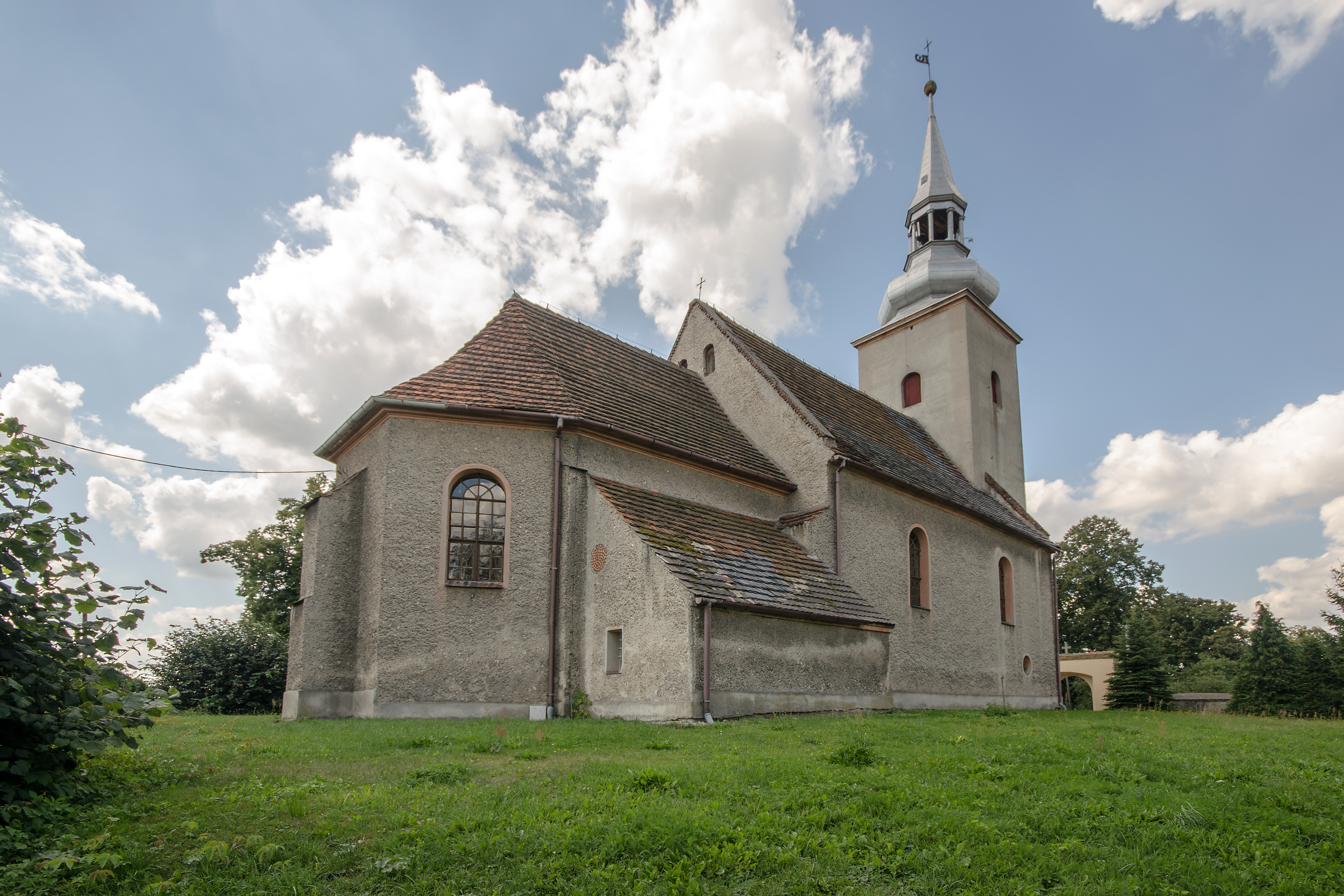
- Saint Nicholas church in Różyna

- Location within Poland
- Coordinates: 50°49′N 17°37′E
- Country: Poland
- Voivodeship: Opole
- County: Brzeg
- Gmina: Lewin Brzeski
- Time zone: UTC+1 (CET)
  - Summer (DST): UTC+2 (CEST)
- Postal code: 49-330
- Vehicle registration: OB

Różyna [ruˈʐɨna] is a village in the administrative district of Gmina Lewin Brzeski, within Brzeg County, Opole Voivodeship, in south-western Poland.

== History ==
The village dates back to the Middle Ages, when it was part of Piast-ruled Poland. The local Saint Nicholas church was mentioned in 1310. Różyna was the location of a motte-and-bailey castle from the 14th-16th century, which is now an archaeological site. In the 18th century, the village was annexed by Prussia, and from 1871 to 1945 it was also part of Germany, before it became again part of Poland following Germany's defeat in World War II.

== Transport ==
The Polish National road 94 runs nearby, south of the village, and the Voivodeship road 462 runs nearby, west of the village.
