= Sarny Małe =

- Village
- Location within Poland
- Coordinates: 50°44′N 17°34′E
- Country: Poland
- Voivodeship: Opole
- County: Brzeg
- Gmina: Lewin Brzeski

Sarny Małe [ˈsarnɨ ˈmawɛ] is a village in the administrative district of Gmina Lewin Brzeski, within Brzeg County, Opole Voivodeship, in south-western Poland.
