= Reimlingen =

- Municipality
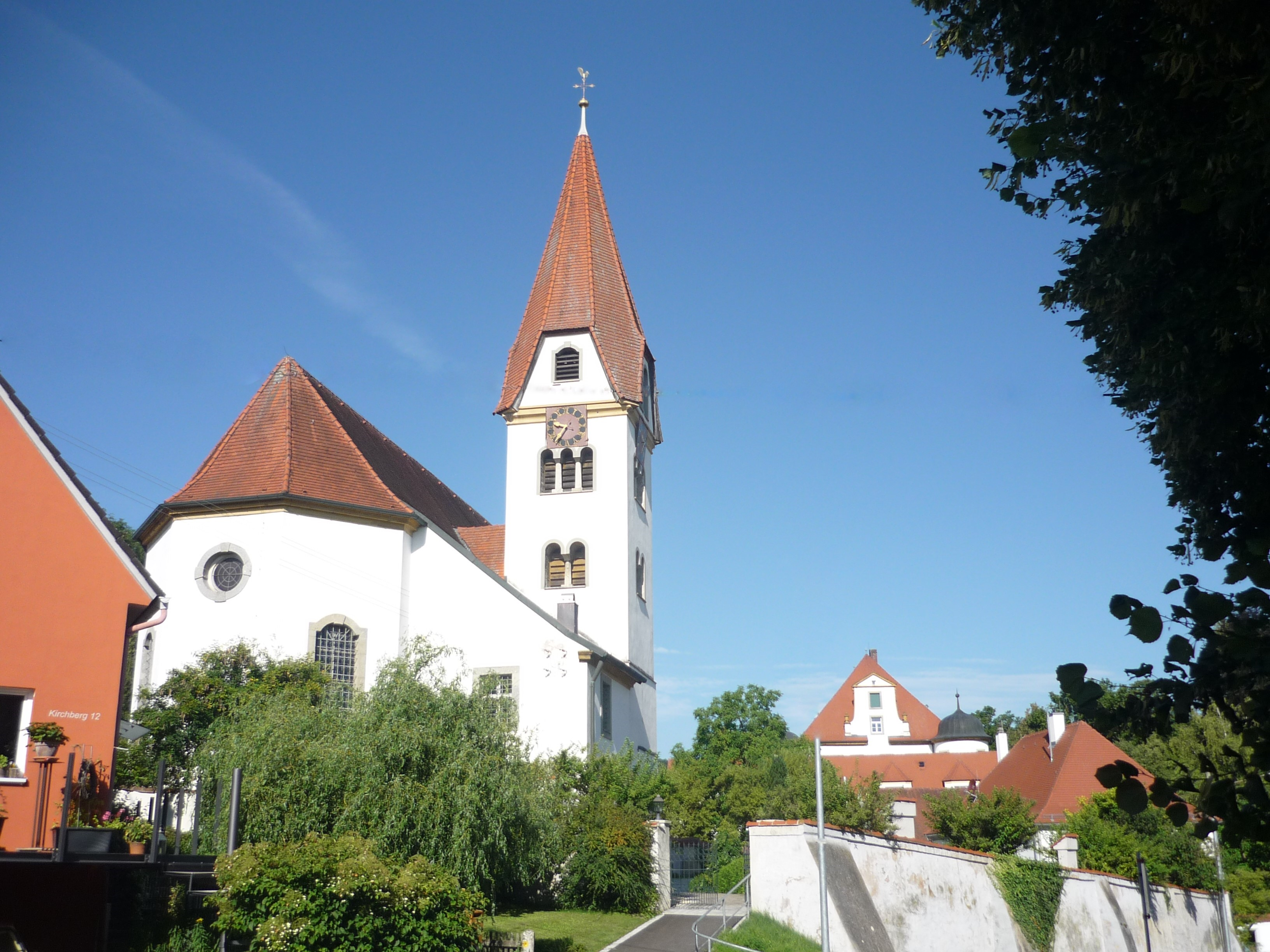
- Church of Saint George

- Coat of arms

- Location of Reimlingen within Donau-Ries district
- Interactive map of Reimlingen
- Location within Germany Location within Bavaria
- Coordinates: 48°49′N 10°31′E
- Country: Germany
- State: Bavaria
- Admin. region: Schwaben
- District: Donau-Ries
- Municipal assoc.: Ries

Government
  - Mayor (2020–26): Jürgen Leberle

Area
  - Total: 9.53 km^{2} (3.68 sq mi)
- Elevation: 438 m (1,437 ft)

Population (2025-12-31)
  - Total: 1,366
  - Density: 143/km^{2} (371/sq mi)
- Time zone: UTC+01:00 (CET)
  - Summer (DST): UTC+02:00 (CEST)
- Postal codes: 86756
- Dialling codes: 09081
- Vehicle registration: DON; NÖ
- Website: https://reimlingen.de/

Reimlingen (German pronunciation: [ˈʁaɪmlɪŋən]) is a municipality in the district of Donau-Ries in Bavaria in Germany.

== Notable people ==
- Józef Wojaczek (1901–1993), Roman Catholic Priest, member of the Mariannhill Missionaries
- Paul Diethei (1925–1997), politician
