= Wyrębiny =

- Settlement
- Location within Poland
- Coordinates: 50°41′04″N 17°47′37″E
- Country: Poland
- Voivodeship: Opole
- County: Opole
- Gmina: Dąbrowa

Wyrębiny [vɨrɛmˈbinɨ] (German: Ferdinandshof, Gut) is a settlement in the administrative district of Gmina Dąbrowa, within Opole County, Opole Voivodeship, in south-western Poland.
