= Prądy, Opole Voivodeship =

Prądy
- Village
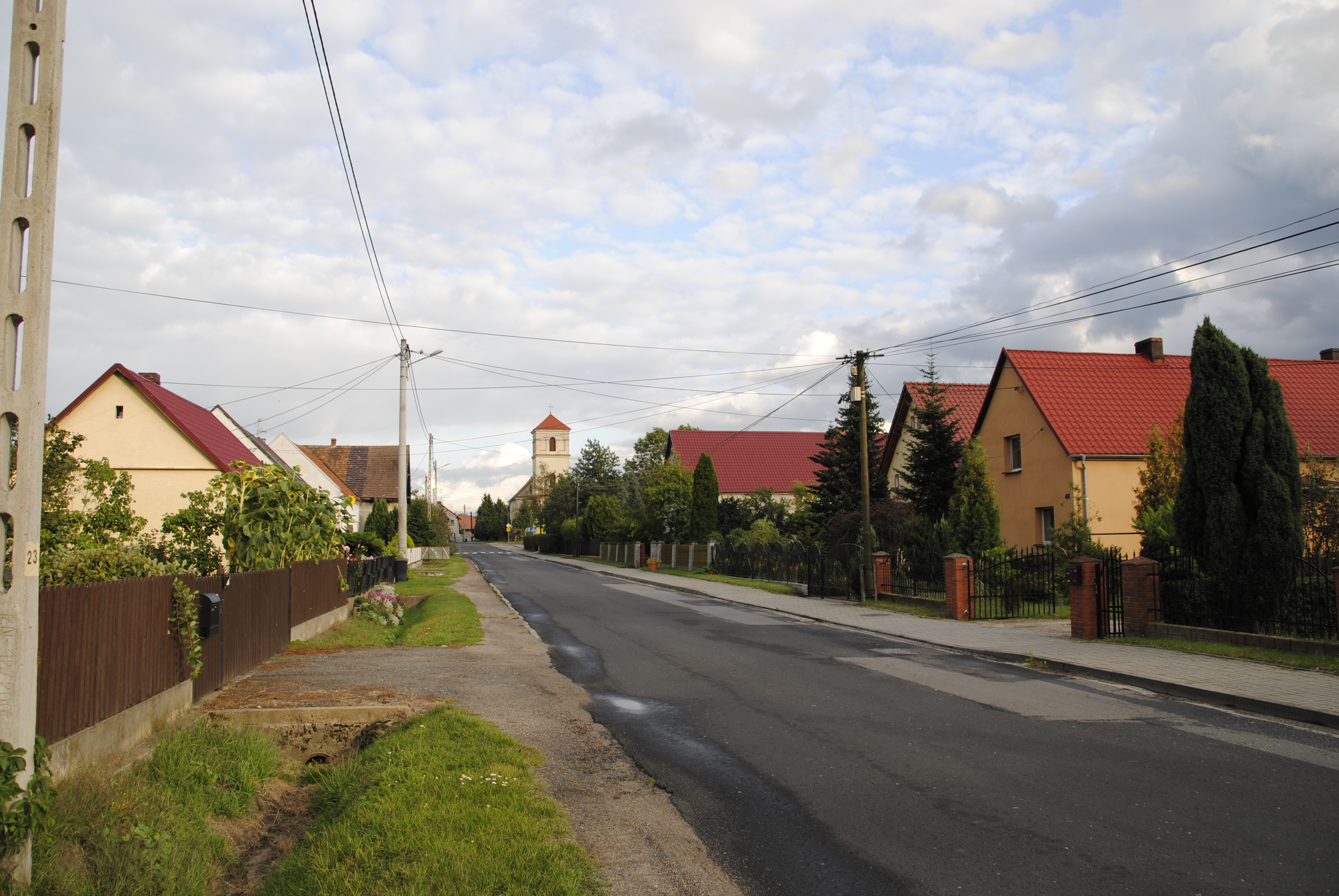

- Location within Poland
- Coordinates: 50°39′N 17°43′E
- Country: Poland
- Voivodeship: Opole
- County: Opole
- Gmina: Dąbrowa
- Population: 370

Prądy [ˈprɔndɨ] is a village in the administrative district of Gmina Dąbrowa, within Opole County, Opole Voivodeship, in south-western Poland.
