= Oldrzyszowice =

- Village
- Location within Poland
- Coordinates: 50°43′3″N 17°37′53″E
- Country: Poland
- Voivodeship: Opole
- County: Brzeg
- Gmina: Lewin Brzeski

Oldrzyszowice [ɔldʐɨʂɔˈvit͡sɛ] is a village in the administrative district of Gmina Lewin Brzeski, within Brzeg County, Opole Voivodeship, in south-western Poland.

We first hear of Oldrzyszowice in 1248. The village was owned by Luise Gräfin von Frankenberg und Ludwigsdorf from 1905 to 1921, when it was handed over to Karl Scholz. By this time the holding was merely 105 ha, and decreased to 97 ha when Karl Scholz Jr. became owner in 1937. It is assumed that Oldrzyszowice stayed in the hands of the Scholz family until 1945, when it was transferred to Poland.

Different sources claim that the court in Oldrzyszowice was built either in the 17th or 19th century. After World War II it was repurposed as a building meant to house workers of the State Agricultural Farm and later destroyed in the 60's. The court park is home to many species of tree, such as the European Hornbeam, English Oak and Tilia Cordata, some of which are over 200 years old.
