= Chróścina, Brzeg County =

Chróścina
- Village
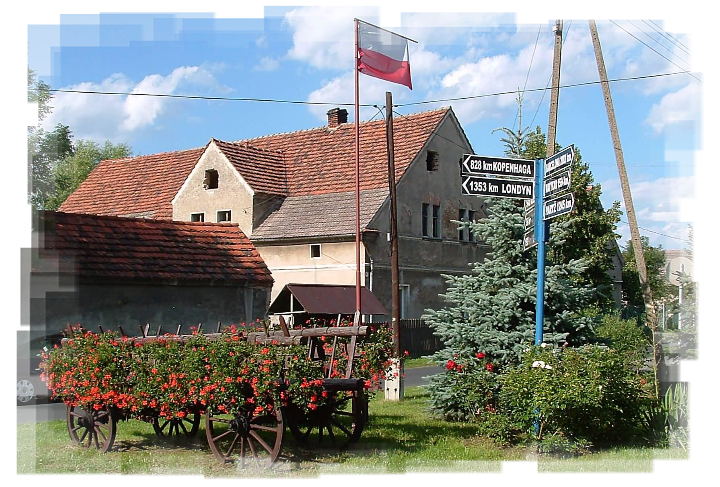

- Location within Poland
- Coordinates: 50°45′37″N 17°41′38″E
- Country: Poland
- Voivodeship: Opole
- County: Brzeg
- Gmina: Lewin Brzeski

Chróścina [xruɕˈt͡ɕina] (German Weißdorf) is a village in the administrative district of Gmina Lewin Brzeski, within Brzeg County, Opole Voivodeship, in south-western Poland.
