= Błażejowice, Brzeg County =

Błażejowice
- Settlement
- Location within Poland
- Coordinates: 50°44′59″N 17°43′36″E
- Country: Poland
- Voivodeship: Opole
- County: Brzeg
- Gmina: Lewin Brzeski

Błażejowice [bwaʐɛjɔˈvit͡sɛ] is a settlement in the administrative district of Gmina Lewin Brzeski, within Brzeg County, Opole Voivodeship, in south-western Poland.
