= Narok, Opole Voivodeship =

Narok
- Village
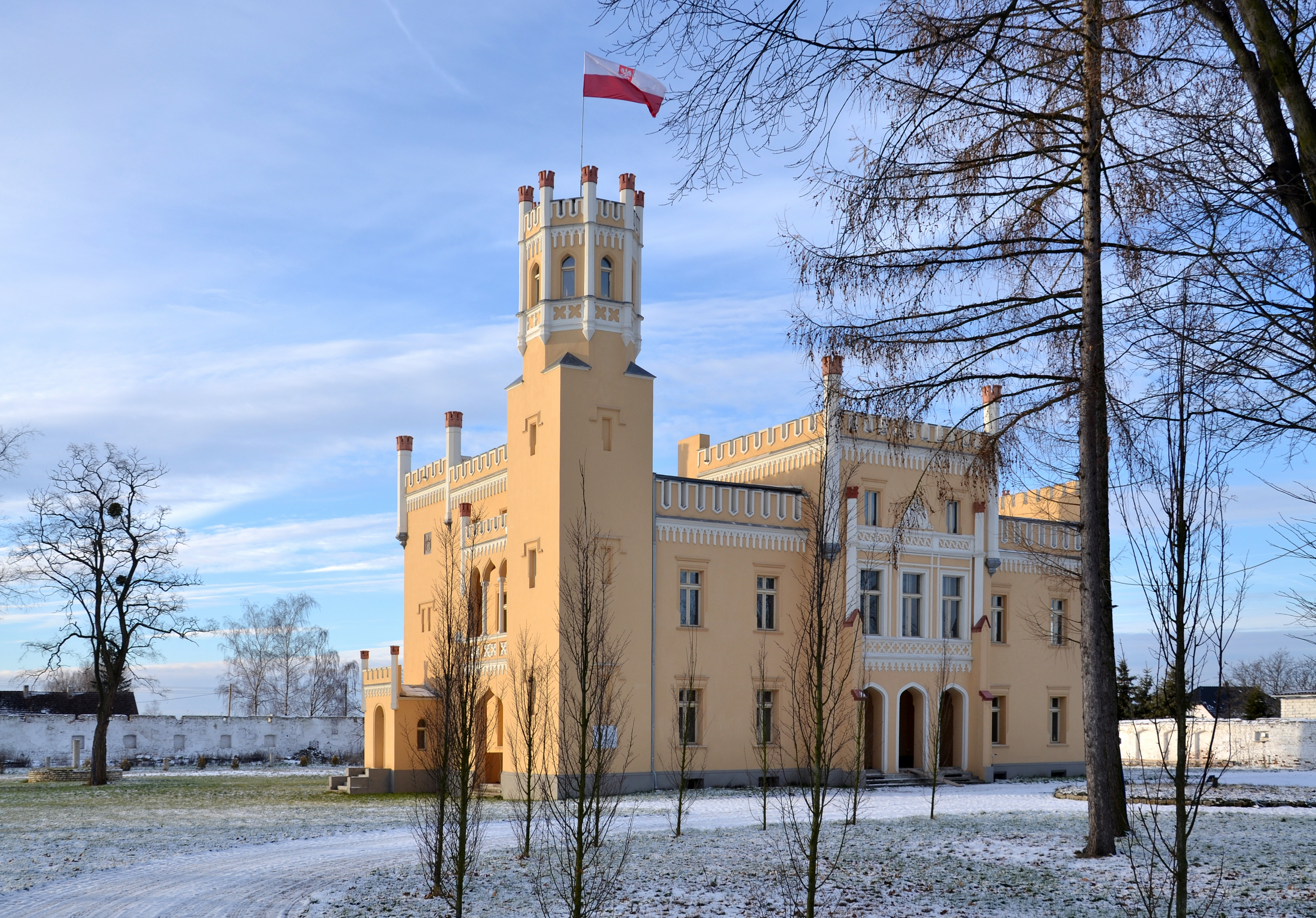
- Palace in Narok

- Location within Poland
- Coordinates: 50°44′36″N 17°47′27″E
- Country: Poland
- Voivodeship: Opole
- County: Opole
- Gmina: Dąbrowa
- Population: 300
- Time zone: UTC+1 (CET)
  - Summer (DST): UTC+2 (CEST)
- Vehicle registration: OPO

Narok [ˈnarɔk] is a village in the administrative district of Gmina Dąbrowa, within Opole County, Opole Voivodeship, in southern Poland.

The name of the village is of Polish origin and comes from the word nur, which means "loon".
