= Nowa Wieś Mała, Gmina Lewin Brzeski =

Nowa Wieś Mała
- Village
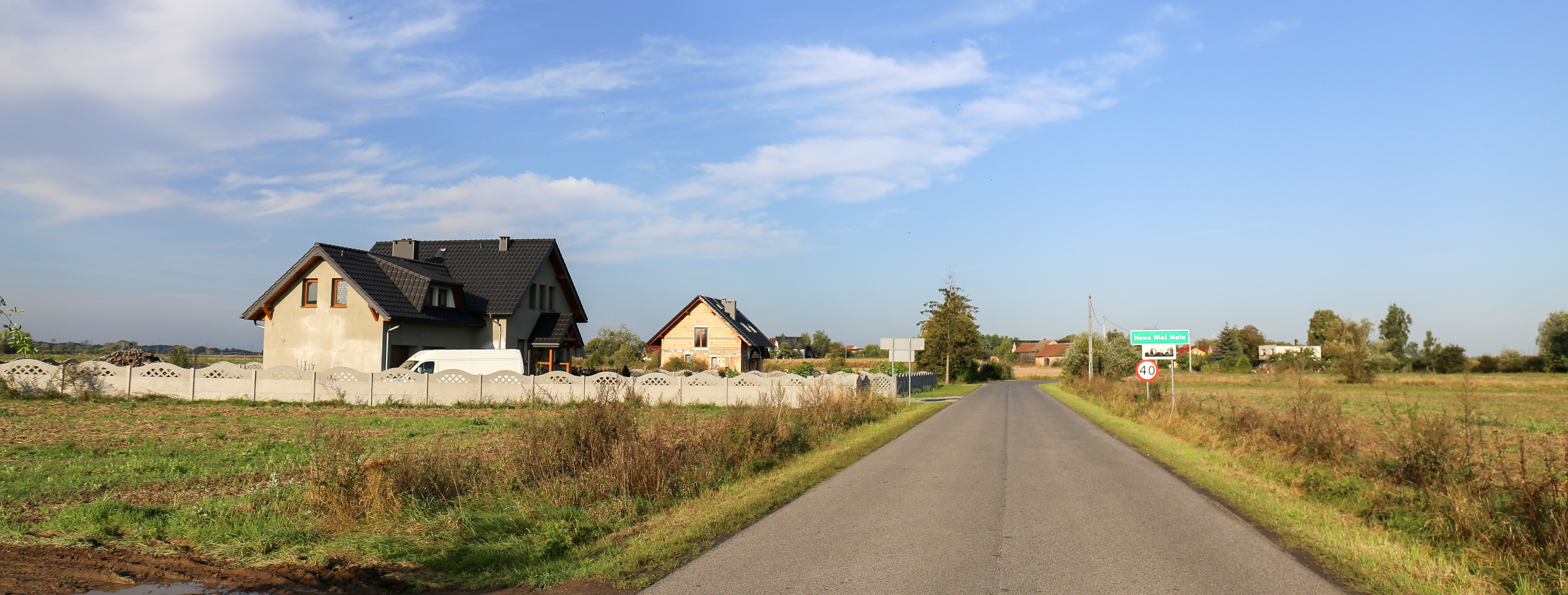

- Location within Poland
- Coordinates: 50°45′28″N 17°34′30″E
- Country: Poland
- Voivodeship: Opole
- County: Brzeg
- Gmina: Lewin Brzeski
- Population: 240

Nowa Wieś Mała [ˈnɔva ˈvjɛɕ ˈmawa] is a village in the administrative district of Gmina Lewin Brzeski, within Brzeg County, Opole Voivodeship, in south-western Poland.
