= Golczowice, Brzeg County =

Golczowice
- Village
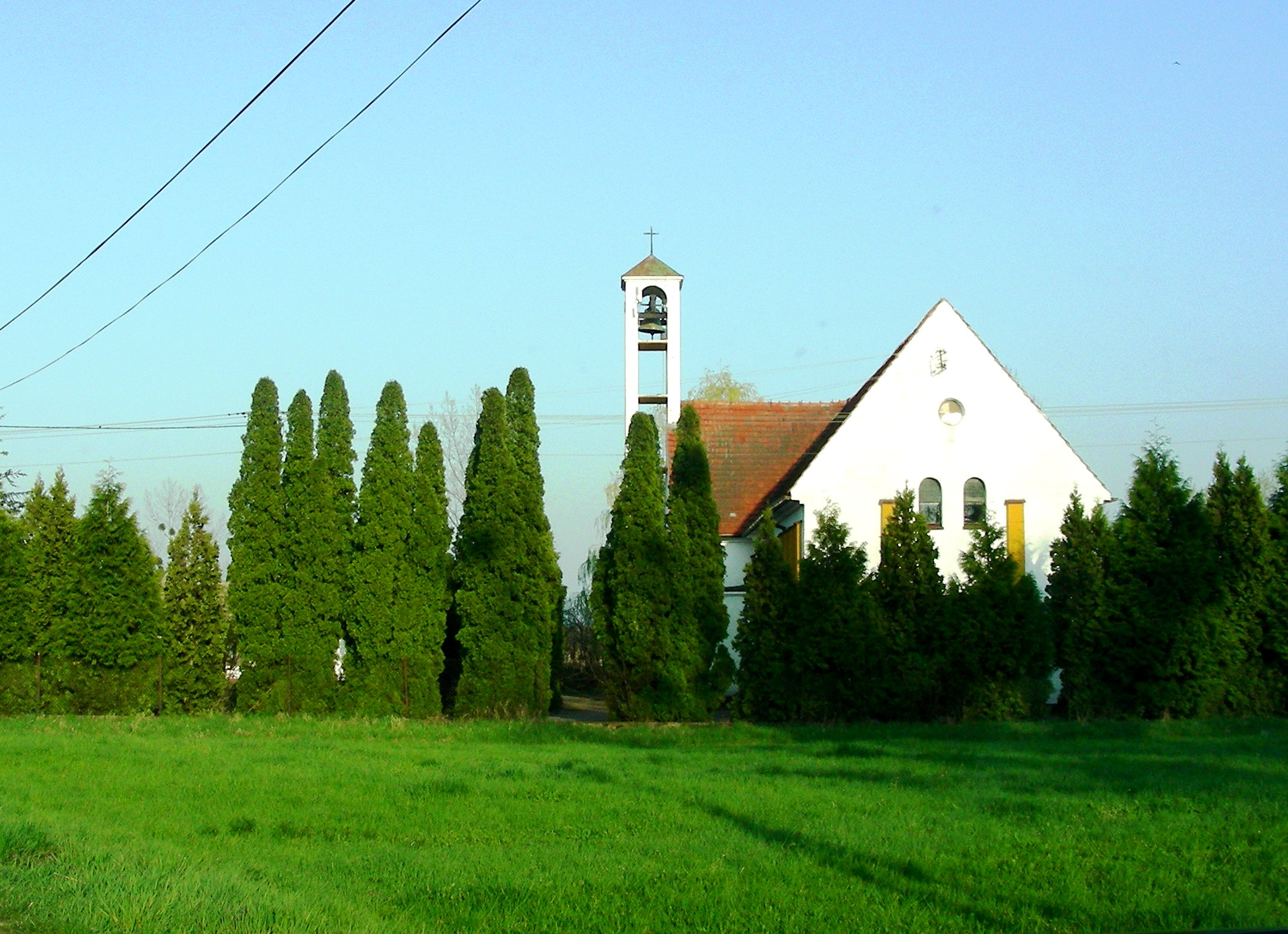
- Catholic church

- Location within Poland
- Coordinates: 50°47′N 17°44′E
- Country: Poland
- Voivodeship: Opole
- County: Brzeg
- Gmina: Lewin Brzeski

Population (approx.)
  - Total: 240

Golczowice [ɡɔlt͡ʂɔˈvit͡sɛ] is a village in the administrative district of Gmina Lewin Brzeski, within Brzeg County, Opole Voivodeship, in southern Poland. It is situated on the Odra River.

In 1480 it was mentioned as Golczow.
