= Chróścina, Opole County =

Chróścina
- Village
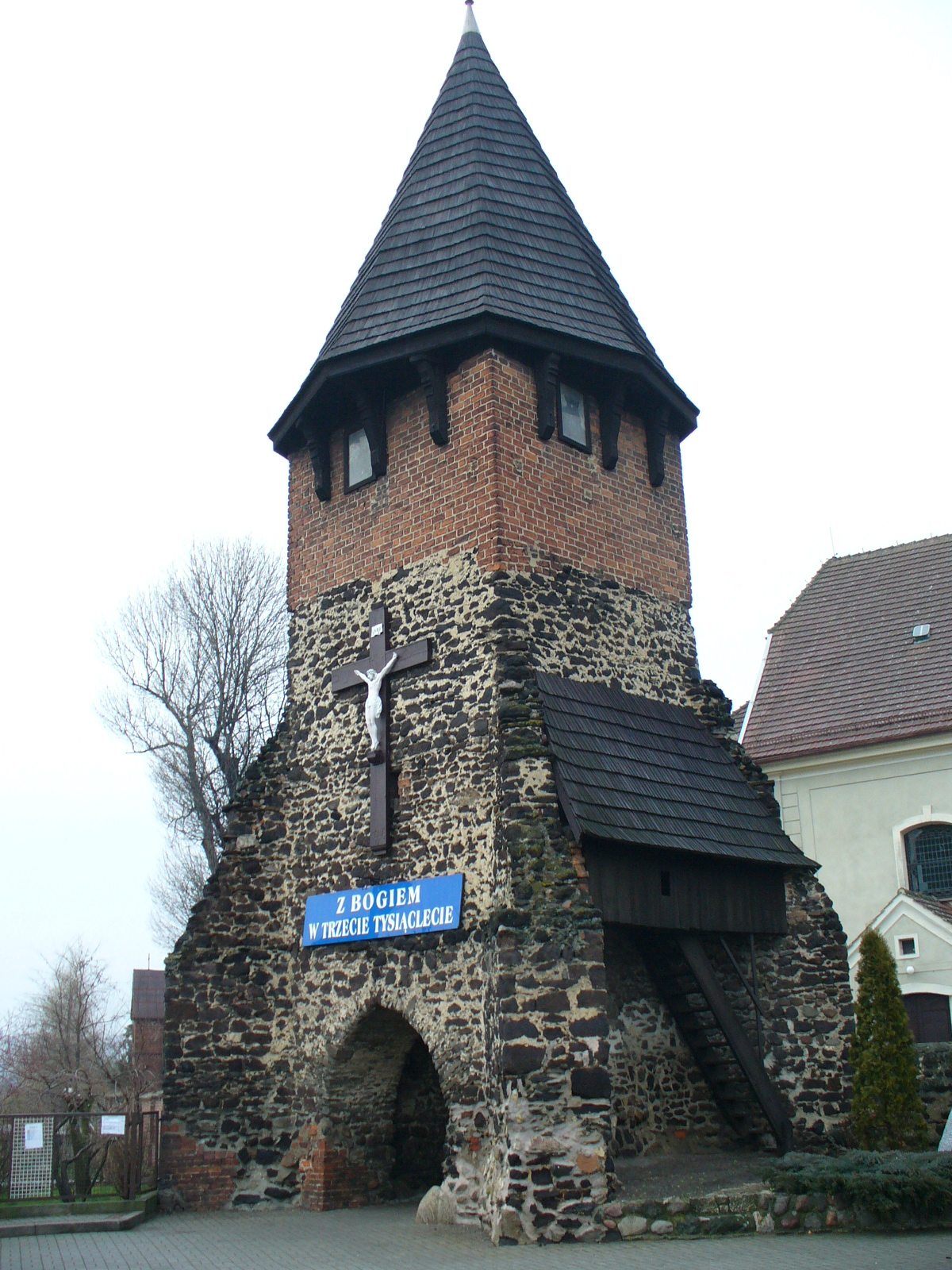
- Belfry in Chróścina

- Location within Poland
- Coordinates: 50°39′56″N 17°48′1″E
- Country: Poland
- Voivodeship: Opole
- County: Opole
- Gmina: Dąbrowa
- Population: 1,585

Chróścina [xruɕˈt͡ɕina] is a village in the administrative district of Gmina Dąbrowa, within Opole County, Opole Voivodeship, in south-western Poland.
