= Wrzoski, Opole Voivodeship =

Wrzoski
- District
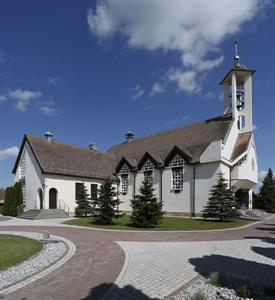
- St. Joseph's Church in Wrzoski

- Location within Poland
- Coordinates: 50°41′N 17°49′E
- Country: Poland
- Voivodeship: Opole
- County/City: Opole
- Population: 530
- Time zone: UTC+1 (CET)
  - Summer (DST): UTC+2 (CEST)
- Vehicle registration: OP

Wrzoski [ˈvʐɔski] (German: Wreske, 1936–45: Heidefeld) is a district of Opole, Poland, located in the western part of the city.

It has a population of 530.

The name of the district is of Polish origin and comes from the word wrzos, which means "heather".
