= Kantorowice, Opole Voivodeship =

Kantorowice
- Village
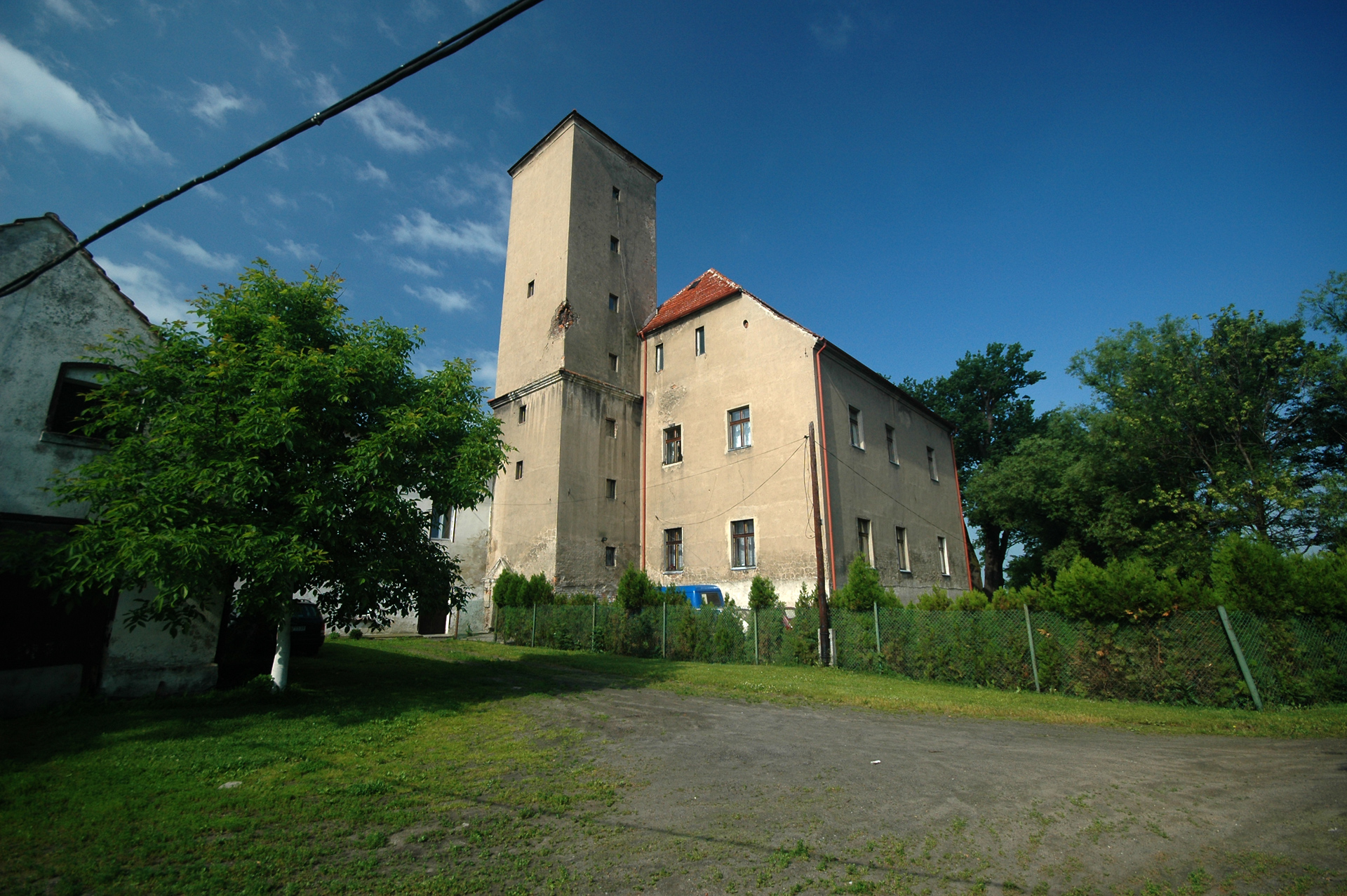
- Palace

- Location within Poland
- Coordinates: 50°45′N 17°36′E
- Country: Poland
- Voivodeship: Opole
- County: Brzeg
- Gmina: Lewin Brzeski

Kantorowice [kantɔrɔˈvit͡sɛ] is a village in the administrative district of Gmina Lewin Brzeski, within Brzeg County, Opole Voivodeship, in south-western Poland.
