= Skorogoszcz =

- Village
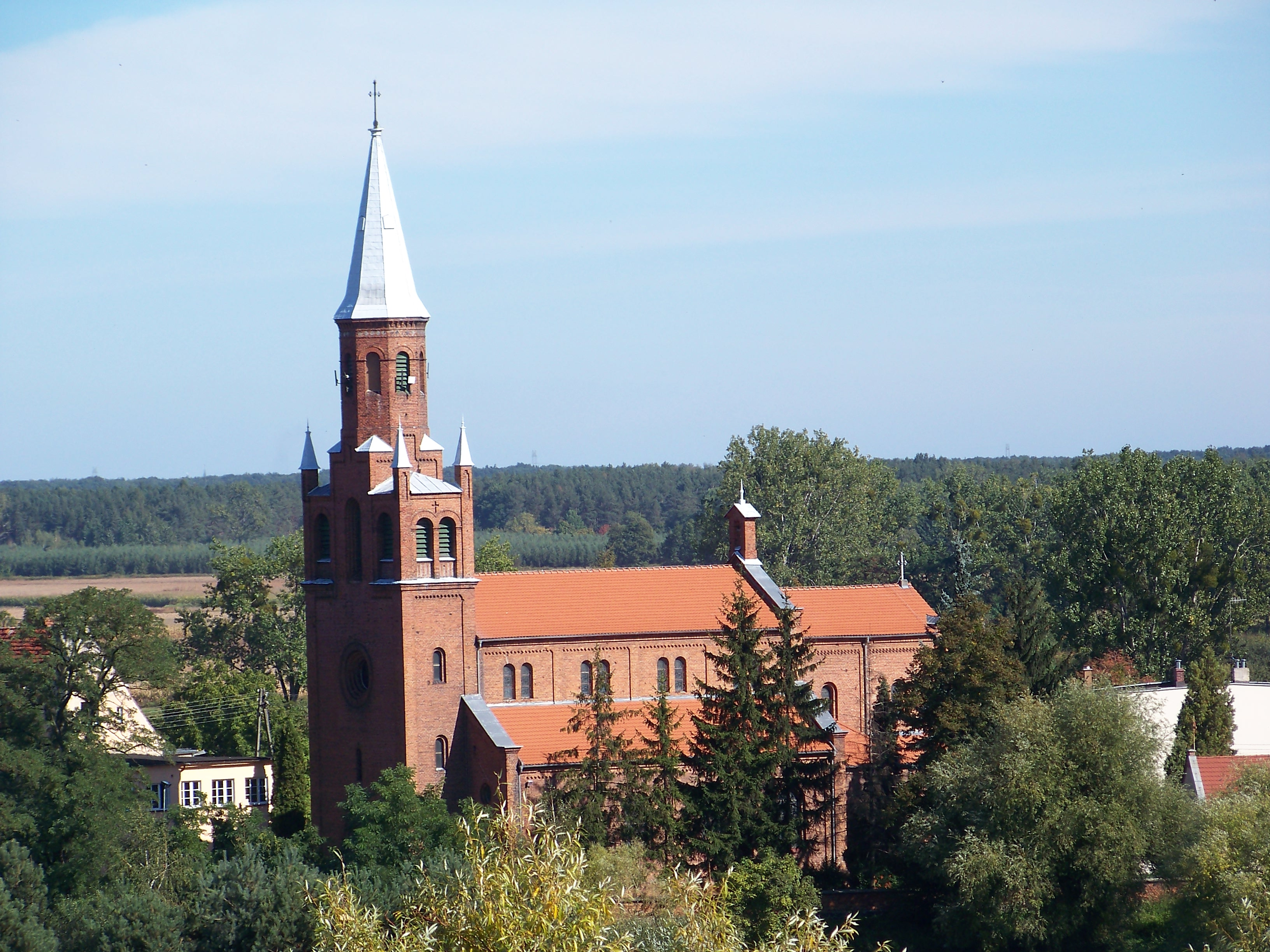
- Saint James church in Skorogoszcz

- Flag Coat of arms

- Location within Poland
- Coordinates: 50°45′N 17°42′E
- Country: Poland
- Voivodeship: Opole
- County: Brzeg
- Gmina: Lewin Brzeski
- First mentioned: 1223
- Population: 1,200
- Time zone: UTC+1 (CET)
  - Summer (DST): UTC+2 (CEST)
- Vehicle registration: SWD
- Website: http://skorogoszcz.pl

Skorogoszcz ([skɔˈrɔɡɔʂt͡ʂ]) is a village in the administrative district of Gmina Lewin Brzeski, within Brzeg County, Opole Voivodeship, in southern Poland.

== History ==
The village was first mentioned in a document of the Diocese of Wrocław from 1223 under the Latinized Polish name Scorogostow. In a document of Duke Casimir I of Opole from 1228 it was mentioned as a village located on Polish law. It was granted town rights in 1271, which it eventually lost in 1945. It was part of Piast-ruled Poland, and later on, it was also part of Bohemia (Czechia) under the Holy Roman Empire, Prussia and unified Germany. During World War II, the German Nazi government operated the E778 forced labour subcamp of the Stalag VIII-B/344 prisoner-of-war camp in the town. Skorogoszcz became again part of Poland after the defeat of Nazi Germany in the war in 1945.

A new cable-stayed bridge was built in Skorogoszcz in 2004–2005.

== Transport ==
Skorogoszcz is located on the Polish National Road No. 94, which connects Zgorzelec at the Poland–Germany border in the west with Korczowa at the Poland–Ukraine border in the east.

== Sports ==
The local football club is LZS Skorogoszcz. It competes in the lower leagues.
