= Jasiona, Brzeg County =

Jasiona
- Village
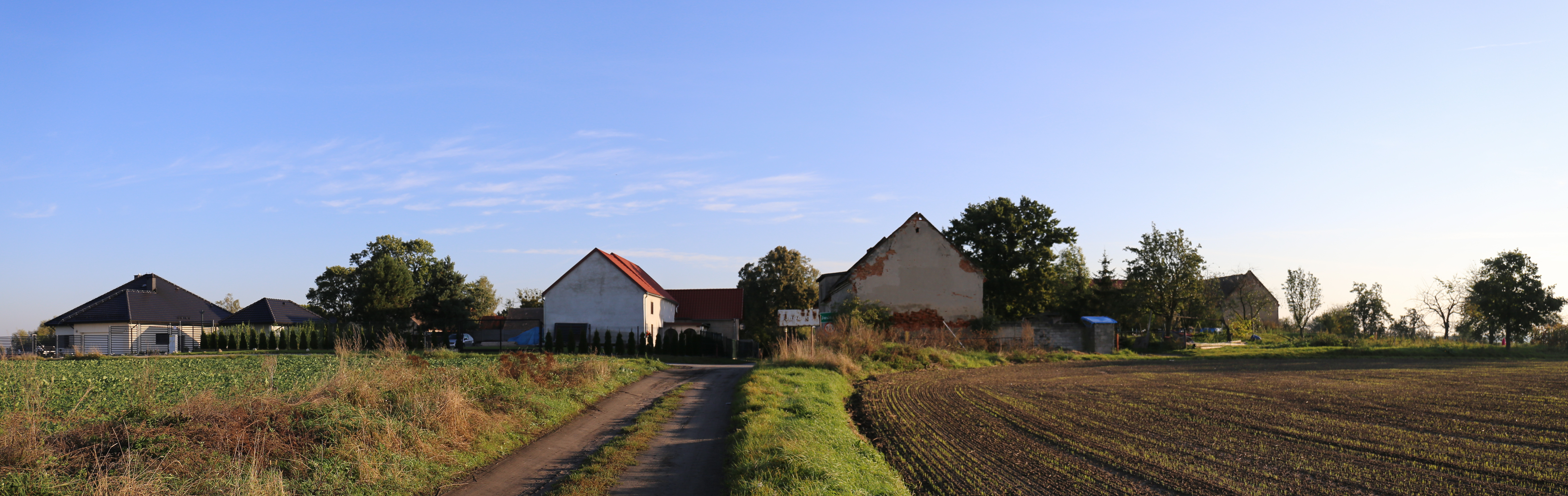
- Jasiona

- Location within Poland
- Coordinates: 50°45′56″N 17°32′13″E
- Country: Poland
- Voivodeship: Opole
- County: Brzeg
- Gmina: Lewin Brzeski

Jasiona [jaˈɕɔna] is a village in the administrative district of Gmina Lewin Brzeski, within Brzeg County, Opole Voivodeship, in south-western Poland.
