= Lewiatan =

Chain of Polish convenience store shops

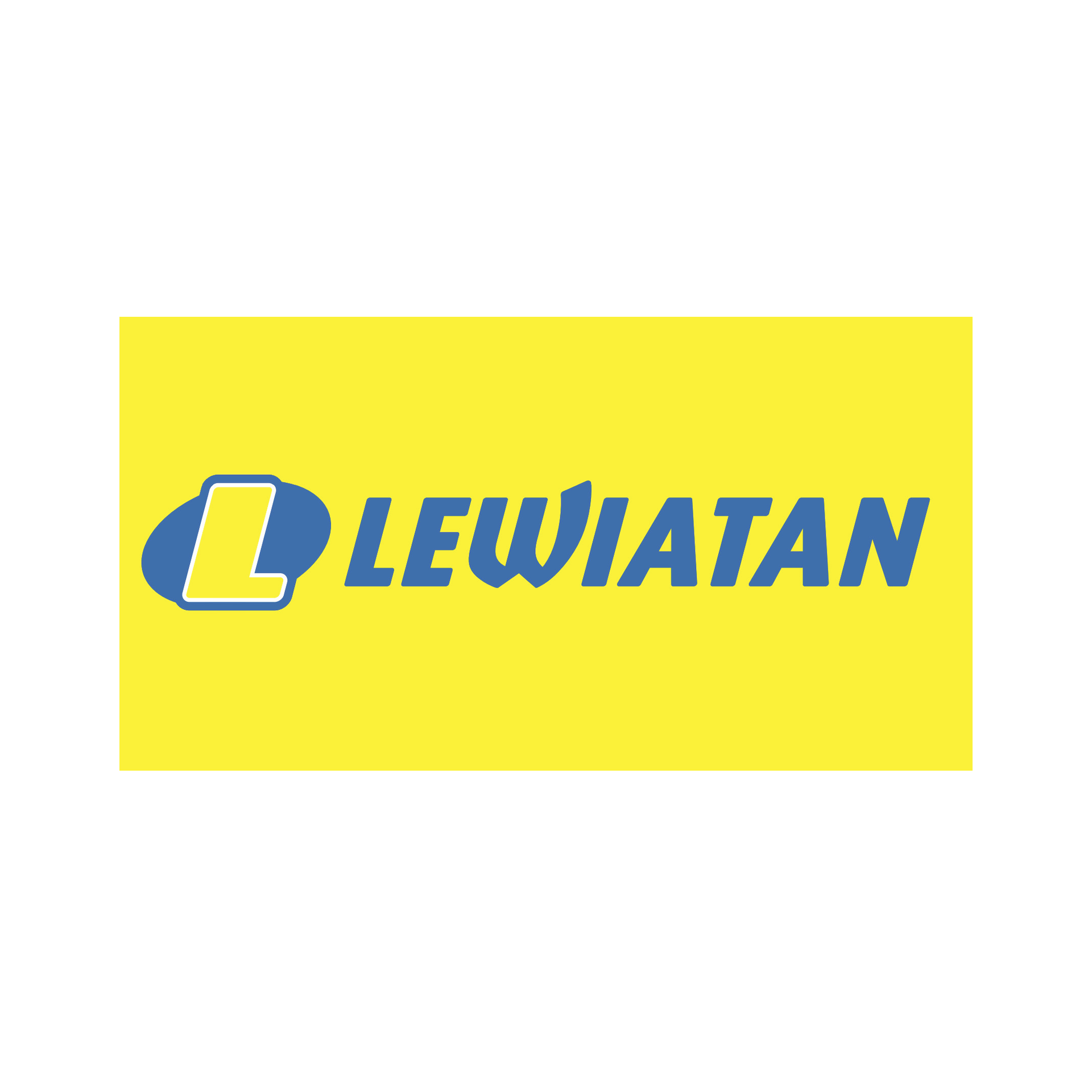
- Company type: Spółka Akcyjna
- Industry: Retail
- Founded: 1994; 32 years ago
- Founders: Waldemar Nowakowski
- Headquarters: Włocławek, Poland
- Number of locations: 3.286 (2025)
- Area served: Poland
- Key people: Robert Rękas (President)
- Revenue: zł 17.5 billion (2024)
- Number of employees: 34,000 (2024)
- Parent: Eurocash (100%)
- Website: lewiatan.pl

Lewiatan is a Polish supermarket chain. It is headquartered in Włocławek. It was fully bought out by corporate group Eurocash in 2011.

== History ==
The company was founded in 1994 in Włocławek by Waldemar Nowakowski.

In 1996, a network of franchised stores began to be established, as well as a connection channel between retail and wholesale. At that time, the first agreements were also signed on joint trade, logistics, and purchasing policies. Regional operating structures also began to be established.

In April 2001, PSH Lewiatan began selling its own branded goods. Some goods included juices, preserved goods, as well as flour. Not only did they sell their own groceries, but also chemical goods.

In 2011, polish corporate group Eurocash fully bought out Lewiatan as well as control over 9 out of 16 regional companies. In that same year, Lewiatan underwent a transformation, changing not only their logo, but also the interior and exterior looks of the store. They were first tested on stores in Płock, Sochaczew, and Radom.

In 2016, Lewiatan was featured on the list of top 10 biggest retail chains in Poland.

In 2020, businessman Robert Rękas took over the role as President. Beforehand, he was involved with the company since 2013.

As of 2025, there is a total of 3,286 Lewiatan locations across Poland.

== Gallery ==
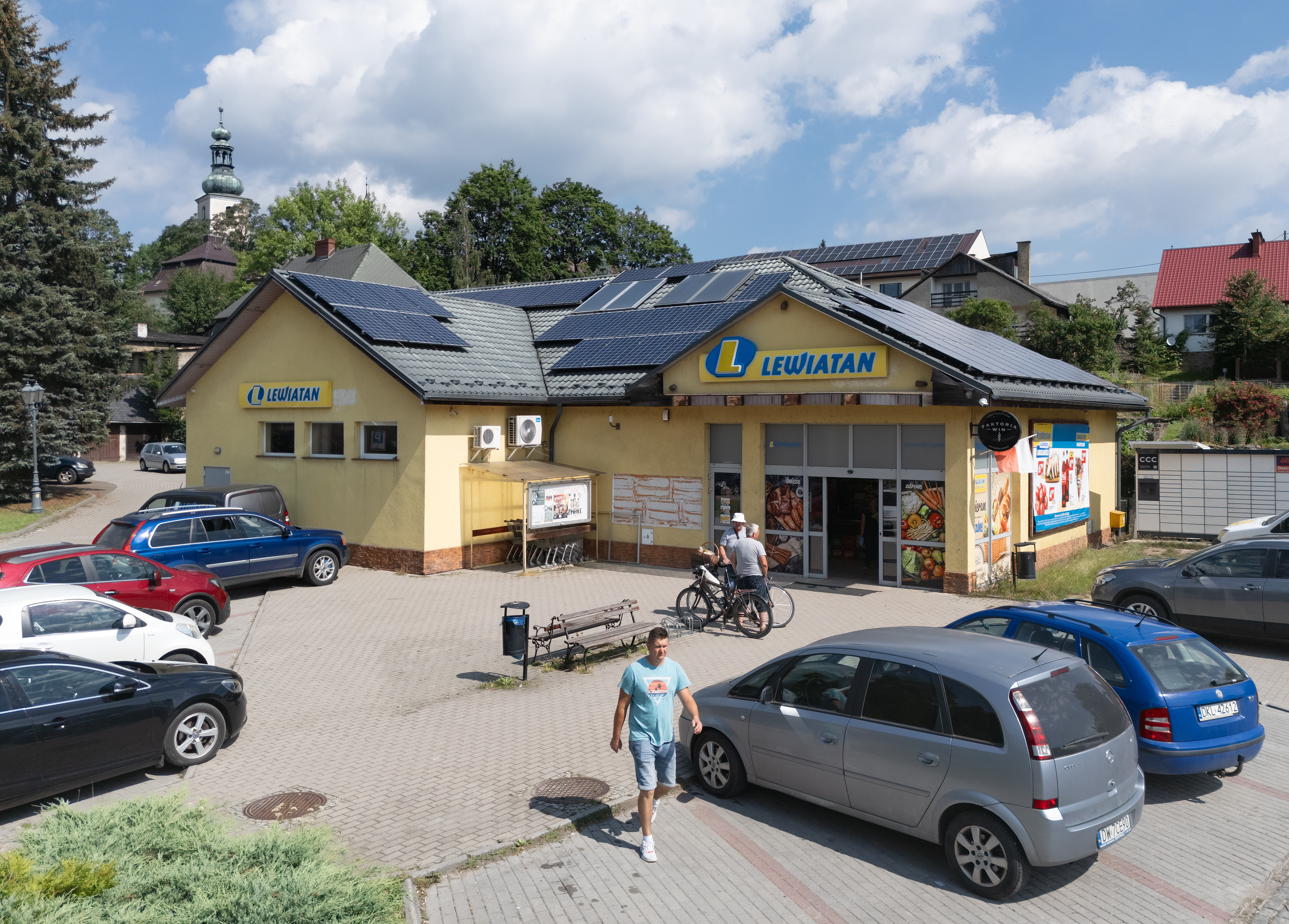
A Lewiatan store in Szczytna

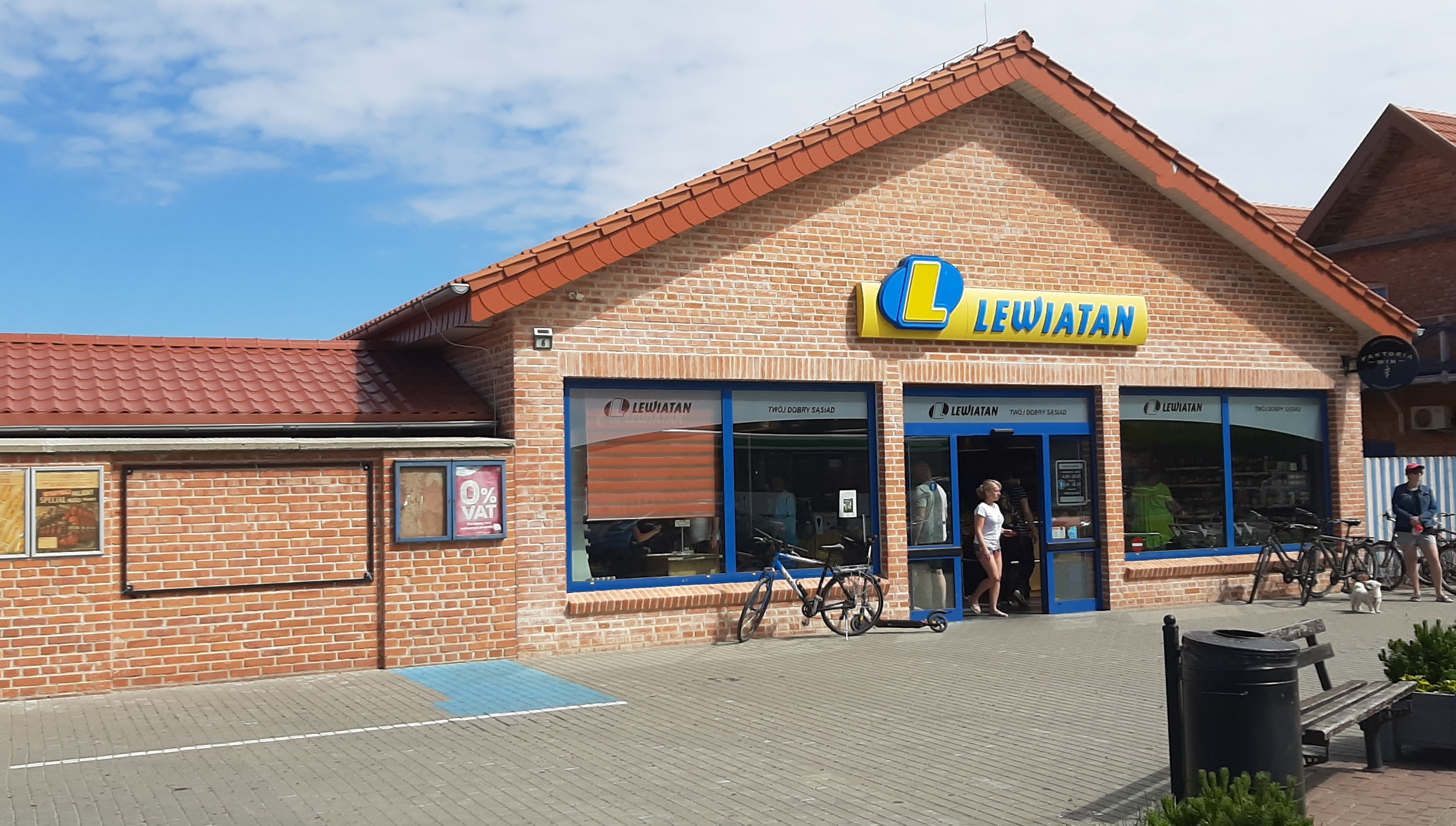
A Lewiatan store in Ostrowo

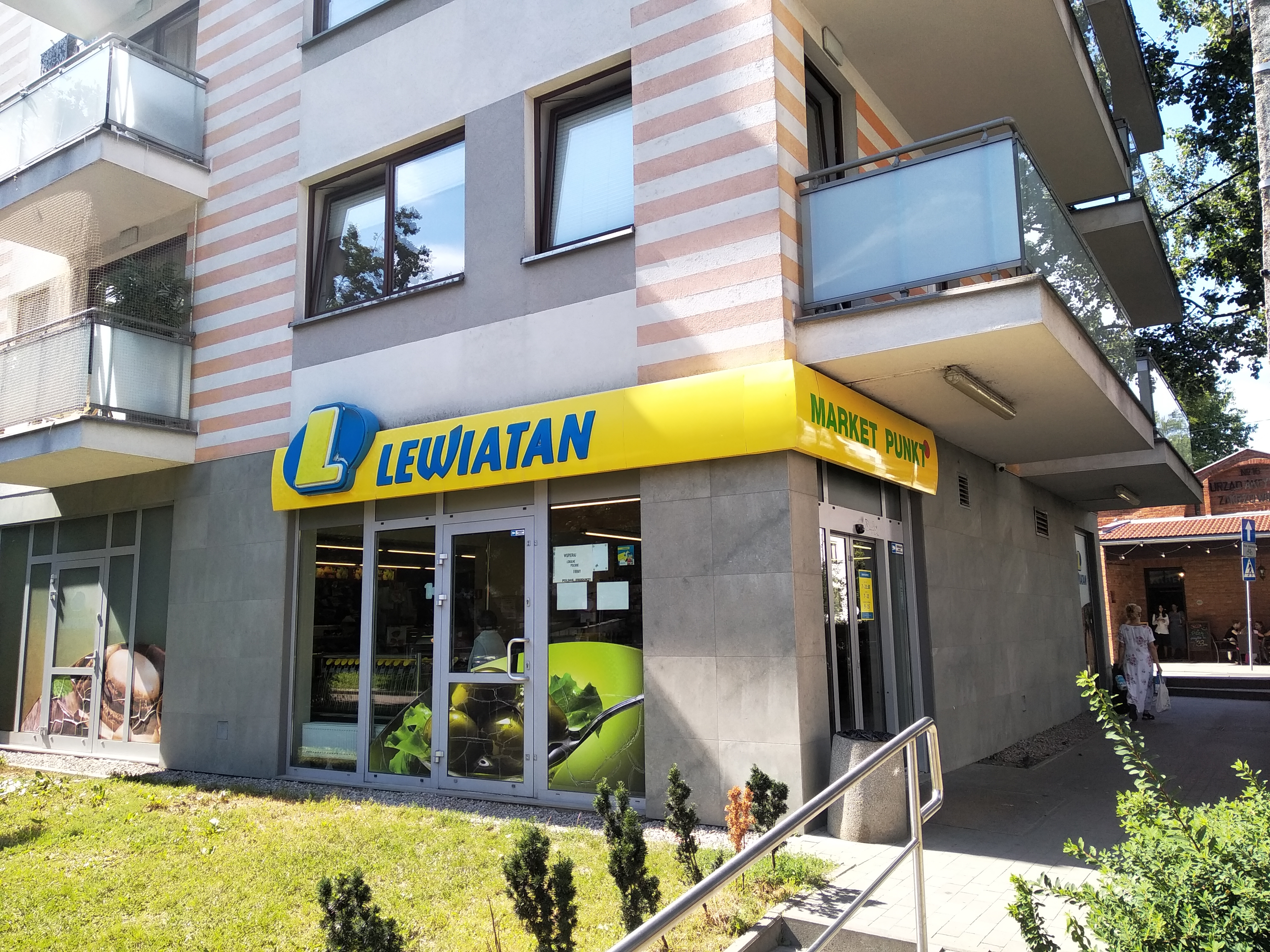
A Lewiatan store in Kraków

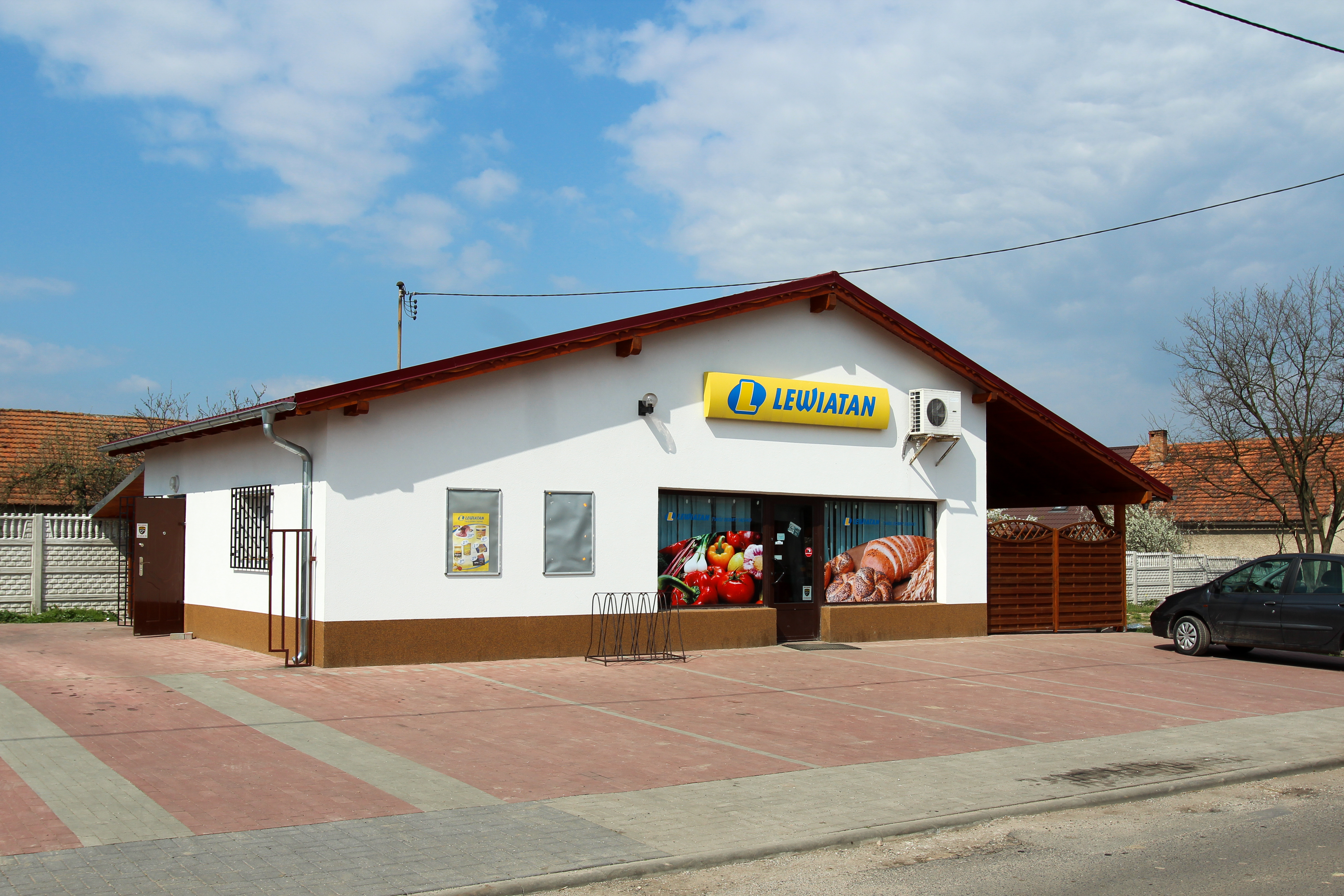
A Lewiatan store in Mańkowice

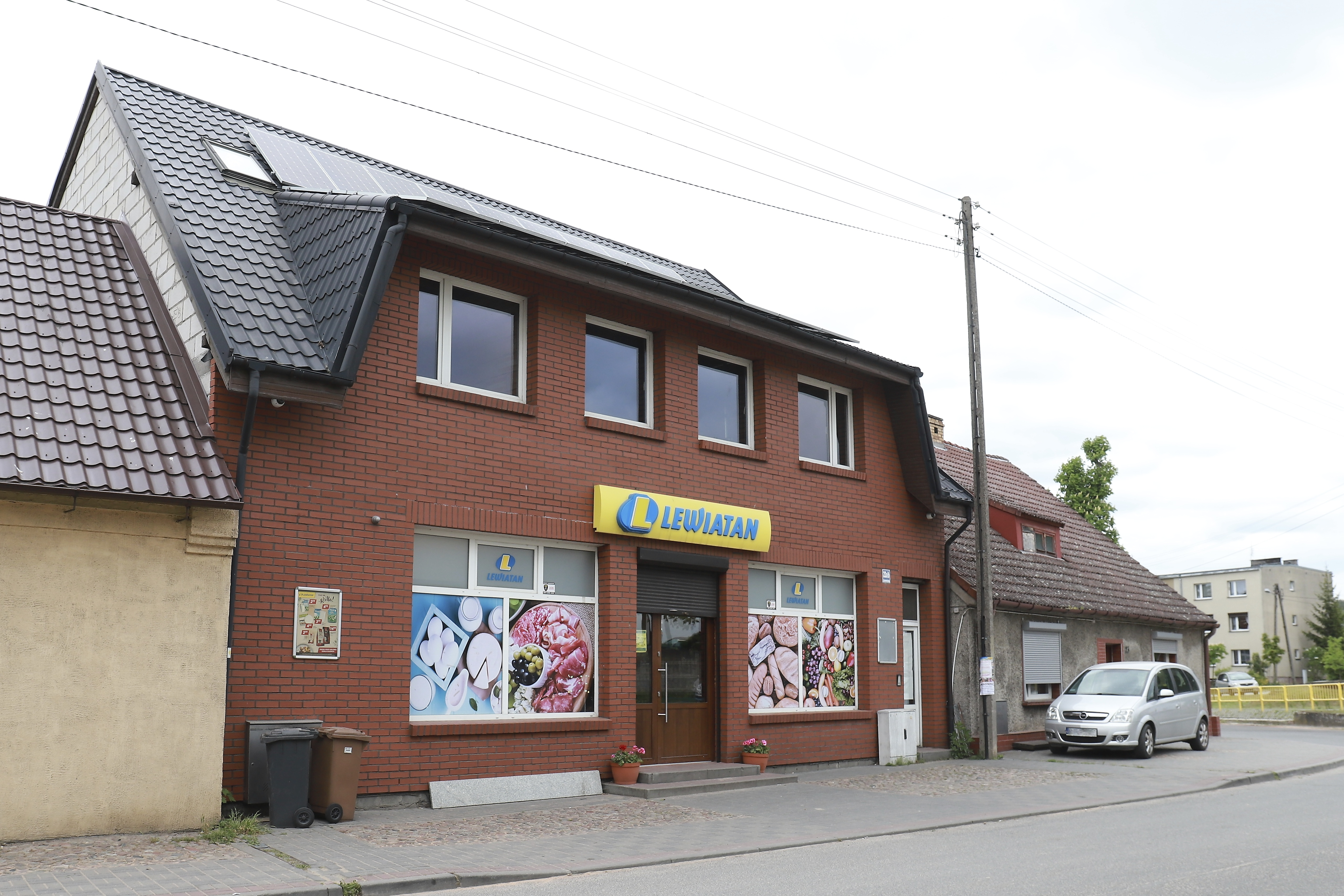
A Lewiatan store in Pszczew

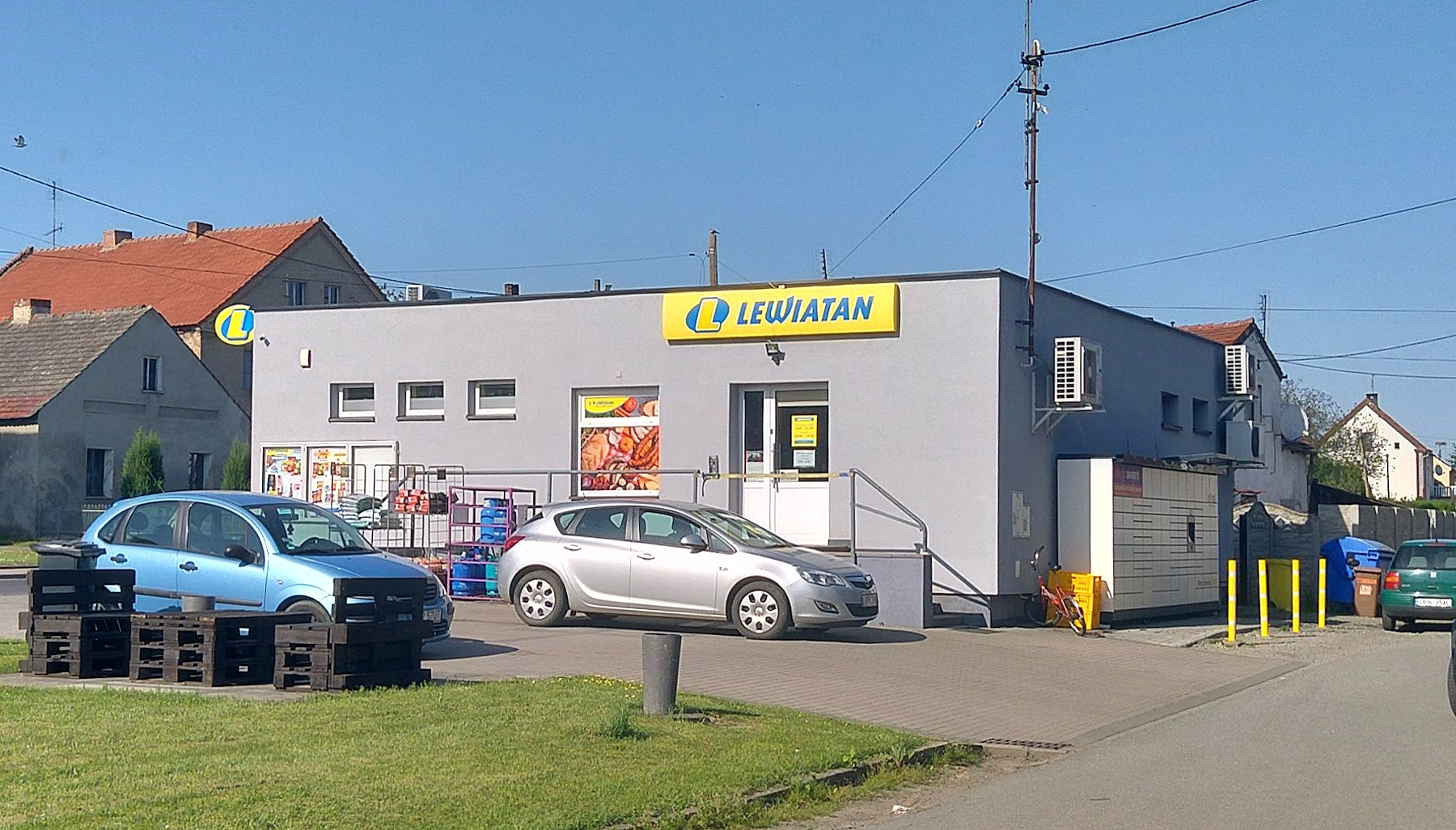
A Lewiatan store in Racławice Śląskie

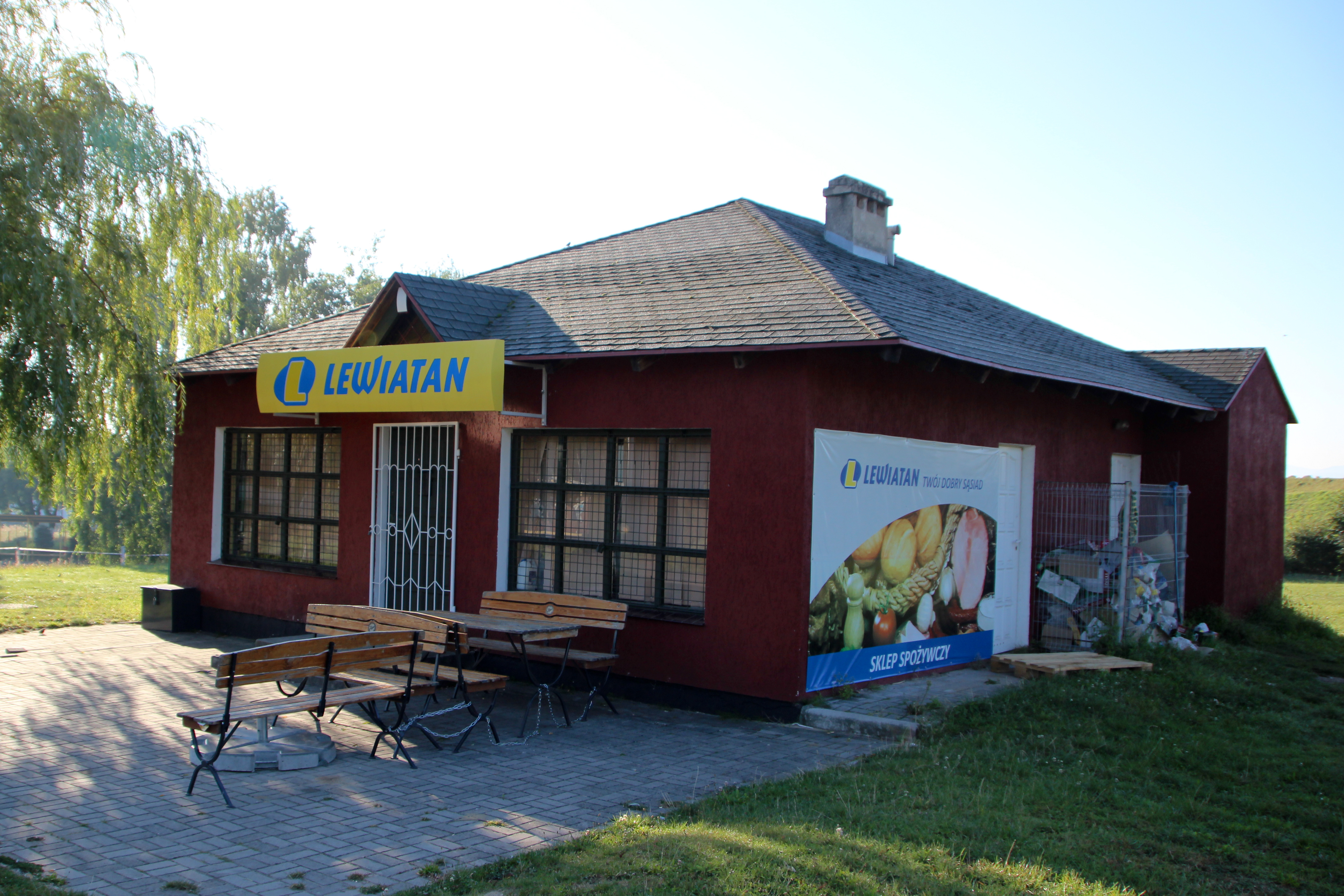
A Lewiatan store in Skorochów

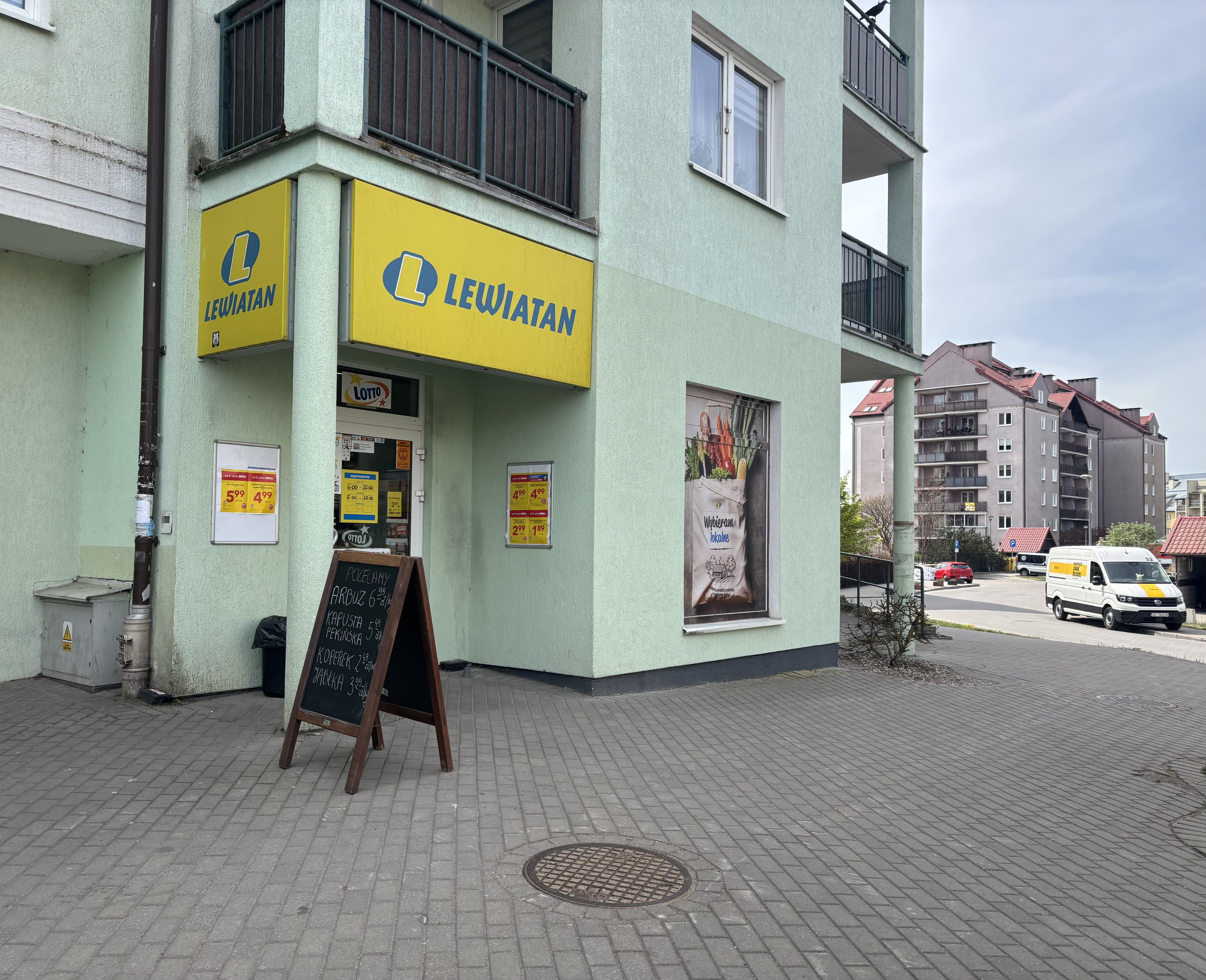
A Lewiatan store in Olsztyn

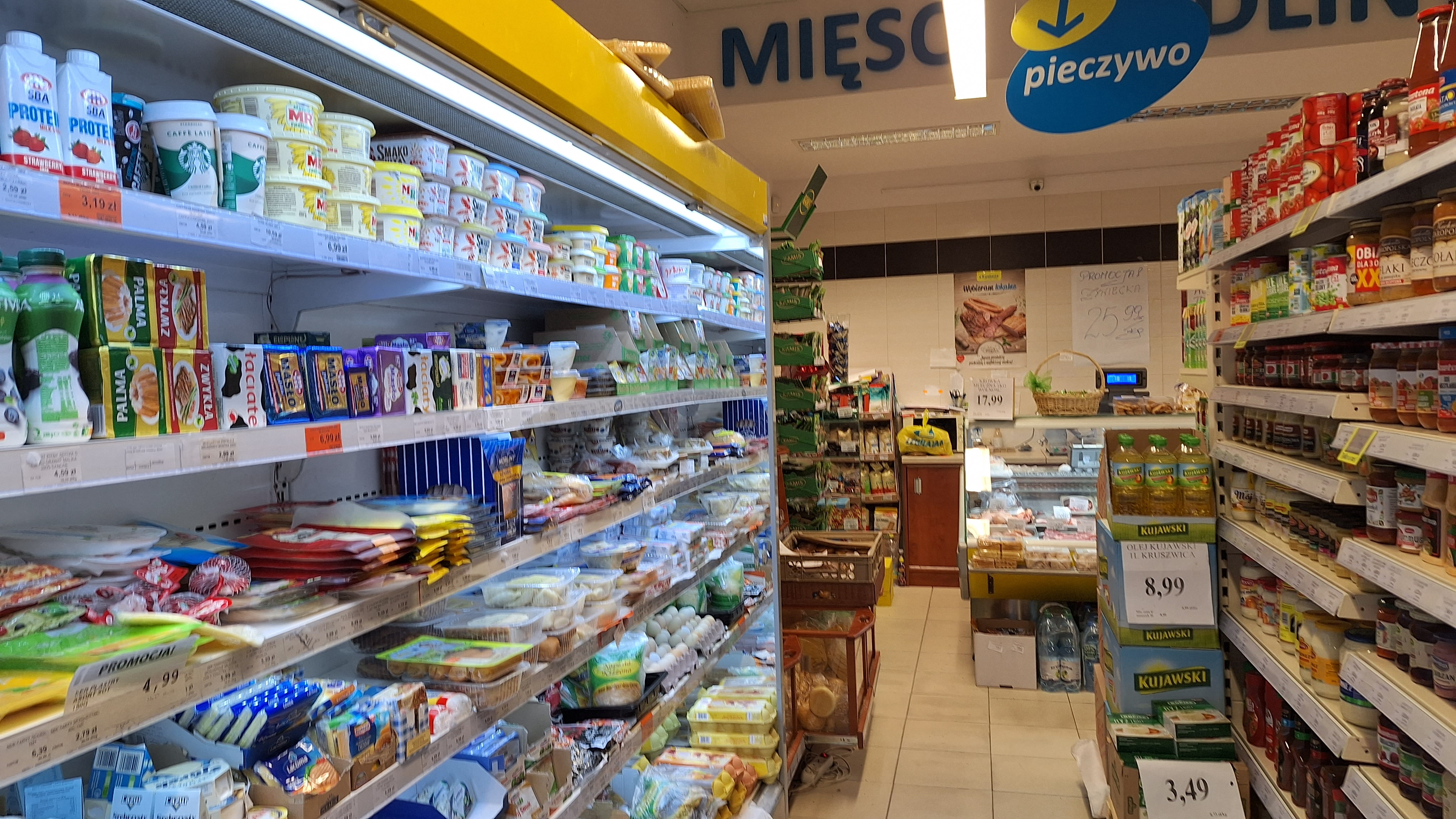
Inside a Lewiatan store in Białystok

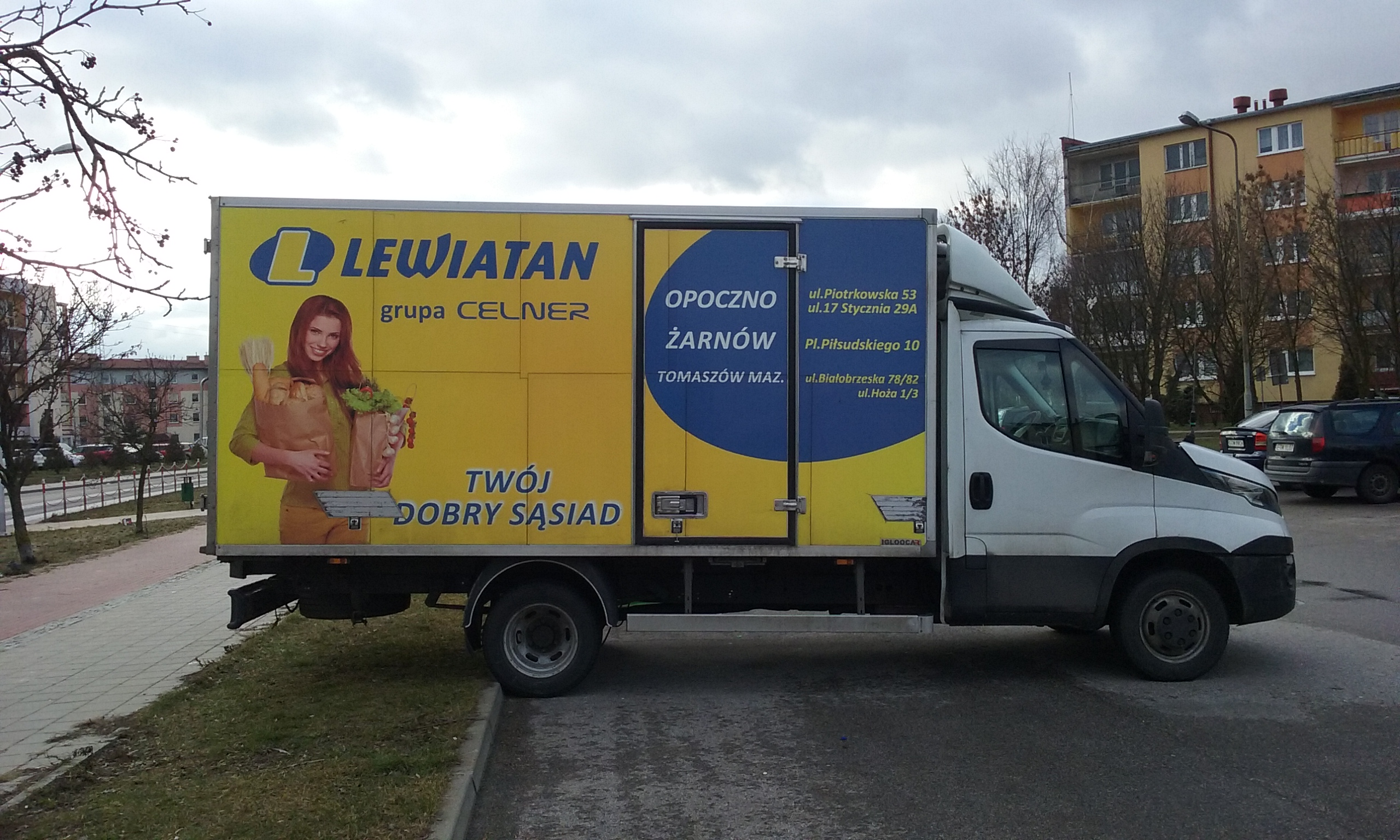
A Lewiatan truck in Tomaszów Mazowiecki

== See also ==
- Eurocash
- List of retail chains in Poland
