= List of supermarket chains in Poland =

This is an incomplete list of supermarket chains in Poland. For supermarkets worldwide see List of supermarkets.

== Major retail chains ==
Retail chain	Type	Number of stores	Headquarters	Background / Notes
Prim Market	Convenience store	63	Poland	
Euro Sklep	Convenience store	449	Poland	
Pokusa	Convenience store	178	Poland	
Avita	Convenience store	67	Poland	
Topaz	Supermarket	116+	Poland	
Wizan	Convenience store	63	Poland	
Biedronka	Supermarket	3802	Poland	Largest supermarket chain in Poland, owned by Jerónimo Martins. Stores are mainly in cities and towns.
Żabka	Convenience store	10412	Poland	
Lewiatan	Convenience store	3286	Poland	
Społem	Convenience store	2400	Poland	Consumers' co-operative of local grocery stores est. 1868.
Groszek	Convenience store	2194	Poland	
Rabat Detal	Convenience store	2000+	Poland	
Lidl	Supermarket	937	Germany	One of the largest supermarket chains in Poland. Stores operate in cities and larger towns.
Top Market	Convenience store	371	Poland	
Stokrotka	Supermarket	981	Poland	
Netto	Supermarket	662	Denmark	
Polomarket	Supermarket	283	Poland	
Aldi	Supermarket	322	Germany	
SPAR	Supermarket	388	Netherlands	
SPAR Express	Convenience store	44	Netherlands	
ABC	Convenience store	7302	Poland	
Rosa	Convenience store	130+	Poland	
Dino	Supermarket	2406	Poland	Supermarket chain, which focuses on smaller towns and villages.
Livio	Convenience store	3000	Poland	
Odido	Convenience store	2500+	Poland	
Minuta8	Convenience store	95	Poland	
Hitpol	Convenience store	116	Poland	
Intermarché	Supermarket	199	France	
Arhelan	Supermarket	101	Poland	
Chata Polska	Supermarket	302	Poland	
Chorten	Convenience store	2316	Poland	
Frac	Supermarket	21	Poland	
Auchan Supermarket	Supermarket	53	France	
Moje Auchan	Convenience store	9	France	
Carrefour Market	Supermarket	148	France	
Carrefour Express	Convenience store	422	France	
Globi	Convenience store	153	France	

== Hypermarkets ==
Retail chain	Type	Number of stores	Headquarters	Background / Notes
Kaufland	Hypermarket	243	Germany	
Carrefour	Hypermarket	95	France	
E.Leclerc	Hypermarket	40	France	
Auchan	Hypermarket	72	France	
bi1	Hypermarket	8	France	In France these are supermarkets and there is no hypermarkets.

== Delicatessen stores ==
Retail chain	Type	Number of stores	Headquarters	Background / Notes
Cezar	Delicatessen	19	Poland	Markets are only in the Lesser Poland and Subcarpathian voivodeships.
Delikatesy Strefa	Delicatessen	60	Poland	Markets are only in the Lesser Poland voivodeship.
Piotruś Pan	Delicatessen	37	Poland	Markets are only in the Subcarpathian voivodeship.
Five o'clock	Delicatessen	23	Poland	Coffee and tea specialists.
Delikatesy Centrum	Delicatessen	1341	Poland	

== Cash and carry wholesalers ==
Retail chain	Type	Number of stores	Headquarters	Background / Notes
Eurocash Cash&Carry	Cash and carry	150	Poland	
Makro	Cash and carry	29	Germany	
Selgros	Cash and carry	19	Germany	

== Specialty chains ==
=== Consumer electronics ===
Retail chain	Type	Number of stores	Headquarters	Background / Notes
Fotojoker	Digital photography	29	Poland	Photographic processing, photobooks as well as cameras and equipment from major photographic companies.
iSpot	Electronics	25	Poland	Apple Premium Reseller.
Komputronik	Electronics	376	Poland	
Media Expert	Electronics	480	Poland	part of Euronics group.
Media Markt	Electronics	81	Germany	
Max Elektro	Electronics	426	Poland	
Neonet	Electronics	300	Poland	
Partner	Electronics	200	Poland	
Pryzmat	Ink cartridges and toners	50	Poland	
RTV Euro AGD	Electronics	286	Poland	
Samsung	Electronics	26	South Korea	
x-kom	Electronics	27	Poland	
CeX	Electronics	11	United Kingdom	
Cortland	Electronics	14	Poland	Apple Premium Reseller Polska
AppleFix	Electronics	4	Poland	
Rebel Electro	Electronics	25	Poland	

=== Culture and Multimedia ===
Retail chain	Type	Number of stores	Headquarters	Background / Notes
Empik	Multimedia	265	Poland	
Inmedio	Multimedia	450	Poland	
Świat Książki	Bookstore	110	Poland	
Trafika	Multimedia	156	Poland	
Kolporter	Multimedia	800 (with Top-Press)	Poland	
Relay	Multimedia	86	Poland	

=== Furniture ===
Retail chain	Type	Number of stores	Headquarters	Background / Notes
IKEA	Furniture	11	Sweden	Ready-to-assemble furniture.
Abra Meble	Furniture	100	Poland	
Black Red White	Furniture	431	Poland	
Bodzio	Furniture	320	Poland	
Jysk Nordic	Furniture	234	Denmark	
Kler	Furniture	35	Poland	
VOX	Furniture	178	Poland	
Mercus	Furniture	6	Poland	
Agata Meble	Furniture		Poland	

=== Hardware store chains ===
Retail chain	Type	Number of stores	Headquarters	Background / Notes
Komfort	Household hardware	159	Poland	
PSB-Mrówka	DIY	318	Poland	
Castorama	DIY	80	France	
Leroy Merlin	Home improvement	72	France	
Bricomarché	Home improvement	170	France	
OBI	DIY	59	Germany	
Bricoman	Home improvement	9	France	
Buduj24.pl	Building material store	1	Poland	
Maldrew	Building material store	3	Poland	.

=== Pharmacy ===
Retail chain	Type	Number of stores	Headquarters	Background / Notes
Blue Stop	Drugstore	141	Poland	
dm-drogerie markt	Drugstore	70	Germany	
Douglas	Cosmetics	113	Germany	
Drogerie Jaśmin	Drugstore	125	Poland	
Drogerie Koliber	Drugstore	170+	Poland	Part of Ambra
Drogerie Natura	Drugstore	257	Poland	
Drogerie Polskie	Drugstore	300+	Poland	
Hebe	Drugstore, Pharmacy	430	Poland	Owned by Portuguese group Jerónimo Martins.
Laboo	Drugstore	670	Poland	
Refan	Cosmetics	100	Poland	
Rossmann	Drugstore	1395	Germany	
Sephora	Cosmetics	93	France	
Super-Pharm	Pharmacy	76	Israel	

=== Pet stores ===
Retail chain	Type	Number of stores	Headquarters	Background / Notes
Ale Animale	Pet industry	36	Poland	Present in 5 voivodeships
Aquael Zoo	Pet industry	69	Poland	
Kakadu Zoo	Pet industry	38	Poland	
Maxi Zoo	Pet industry	142	Germany	
Zoo Karina	Pet industry	39	Poland	

== Fashion ==
Retail chain	Type	Number of stores	Headquarters	Background / Notes
4F	Clothing, outdoor retailer	274	Poland	
5.10.15.	Children's clothing	220	Poland	
8a.pl	Outdoor retailer	6	Poland	
Adidas	Clothing, sports goods	38	Germany	
Bershka	Clothing	37	Spain	
Big Star	Clothing	220	Poland	
Bytom	Clothing	98	Poland	
C&A	Clothing	44	Belgium/Germany	
Calzedonia	Underwear	50	Italy	
Carry	Clothing	100+	Poland	
CCC	Shoes	528	Poland	
Chanel	Designer clothing	3	France	
Change	Underwear	44	Denmark	
Coccodrillo	Children's clothing	250	Poland	
Converse	Clothing	9	United States	
Cropp	Clothing	182	Poland	
Decathlon	Sports goods	68	France	
Deichmann	Shoes	293	Germany	
Dior	Designer clothing	1	France	
Diverse	Clothing	342	Poland	
Ecco	Shoes	43	Denmark	
Esotiq	Underwear	158	Germany	
Etam	Underwear	29	France	
Factory Outlet	Clothing	5	Spain	
Foot Locker	Clothing, shoes	12	United States	
Gatta	Underwear	101	Poland	
Giacomo Conti	Clothing	86	Poland	
Greenpoint	Clothing	219	Poland	
Guess	Clothing	61	United States	
HalfPrice	Clothing	153	Poland	
H&M	Clothing	162	Sweden	
Hermès	Designer clothing	1	France	
House	Clothing	165	Poland	
Intimissimi	Underwear	86	Italy	
Jack Wolfskin	Outdoor retailer	14	Germany	
JD Sports	Clothing	30	United Kingdom	
Kappahl	Clothing	37	Sweden	
Kazar	Clothing	43	Poland	
Lacoste	Designer clothing	10	France	
Lee Cooper	Clothing	30	United Kingdom	
Levi's	Clothing	25+	United States	
Louis Vuitton	Designer clothing	1	France	
Mango	Clothing	35	Spain	
Marc O'Polo	Clothing	16	Germany	
Martes Sport	Sports goods	346	Poland	
Massimo Dutti	Clothing	24	Spain	
Medicine	Clothing	111	Poland	
Mohito	Clothing	100+	Poland	
Monnari	Clothing	208	Poland	
Moodo	Clothing	209	Poland	
New Balance	Clothing, shoes	34	United States	
NewYorker	Clothing	120	Germany	
Nike	Clothing, sports goods	35	United States	
NKD	Clothing	21	Germany	
Ochnik	Clothing, fashion accessories	117	Poland	
Olsen	Clothing	16	Germany	
PARFOIS	Fashion accessories	22	Portugal	
Peek & Cloppenburg	Clothing	12	Germany	
Pepco	Clothing	1415	Poland	
Primark	Clothing	9	Ireland	
Pull&Bear	Clothing	34	Spain	
Puma	Clothing	23	Germany	
Quiosque	Clothing	136	Poland	
Regatta	Outdoor retailer	13	United Kingdom	Store count without affiliate stores, only official stores.
Reserved	Clothing	97	Poland	
Ryłko	Shoes	146	Poland	
Sinsay	Clothing	706	Poland	
Smyk	Children's clothing	263	Poland	
Snipes	Shoes	34	Germany	
Solar	Clothing	149	Poland	
Stradivarius	Clothing	44	Spain	
Tatuum	Clothing	83	Poland	
Terranova	Clothing	14	Italy	
Tezenis	Underwear	33	Italy	
The North Face	Outdoor retailer	25	United States	
Timberland	Clothing, shoes	9	United States	
Triumph	Underwear	35	Switzerland	
Under Armour	Clothing	13	United States	
Van Graaf	Clothing	9	Germany	
Vans	Clothing	12	United States	
Vertus	Clothing	147	Poland	
Victoria's Secret	Underwear, Fashion accessories	6	United States	
Vistula	Clothing	170	Poland	
Wittchen	Fashion accessories	83	Poland	
Wojas	Shoes	90	Poland	
Wólczanka	Clothing	100	Poland	
Zara	Clothing	37	Spain	

== See also ==
- List of restaurant chains in Poland
