= University of Radom =

Public university in Radom, Poland

Kazimierz Pułaski University of Radom
- Uniwersytet Radomski im. Kazimierza Pułaskiego
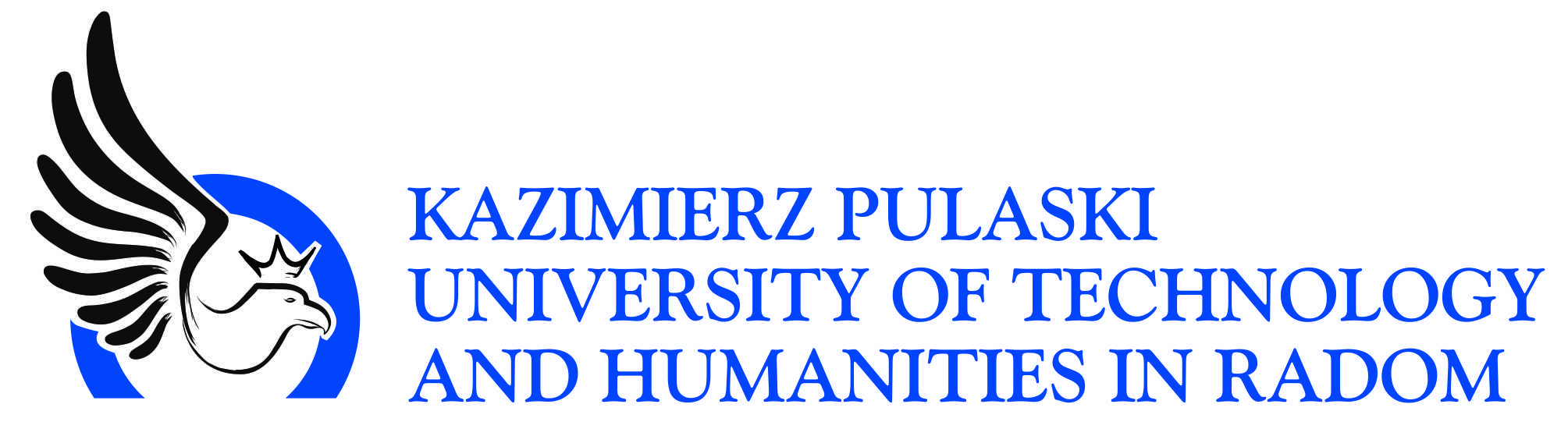
- Latin: Universitas Radomensis Casimirus Pulaski
- Former names: Kazimierz Pulaski University of Technology and Humanities in Radom; School of Engineering of General Technical Organization in Radom; Extramural School of Engineering in Radom; Kielce-Radom Extramural School of Engineering in Kielce; Kielce-Radom Higher School of Engineering in Kielce; Kielce University of Technology; Higher School of Engineering in Radom; Kazimierz Pułaski Higher School of Engineering in Radom; Kazimierz Pułaski Technical University of Radom
- Motto: Ku godnej przyszłości
- Motto in English: To the dignified future
- Type: Public
- Established: 19 April 1950
- Academic affiliations: ERASMUS programme Leonardo da Vinci programme
- Chancellor: Mariusz Początek
- Vice-Chancellor: Anna Towarek
- Rector: Sławomir Bukowski
- Vice Rectors: Elżbieta Sałata; Waldemar Nowakowski; Wojciech Żurowski
- Academic staff: 508
- Administrative staff: 420
- Students: 4,452 (12.2023)
- Location: Malczewskiego 29; PL26-600, Radom, Masovian Voivodeship, Poland; 51°24′N 21°10′E
- Campus: Urban
- Colors: Blue
- Sporting affiliations: AZS Politechnika Radomska
- Website: uniwersytetradom.pl

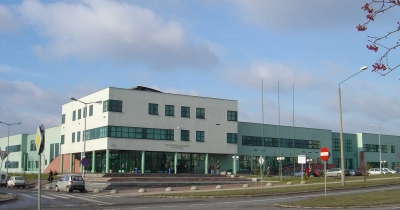
Faculty of Economics of the University of Radom

Kazimierz Pułaski University of Radom is a Polish public university in Radom. It was the biggest university of the former Radom Voivodeship. The university was established in 1950 as a School of Engineering of General Technical Organization. For more than 50 years its name was often changed. The University of Technology and Humanities in Radom comprises 8 faculties, 4 of which are of technical profile: Faculty of Mechanical Engineering, Faculty of Transport and Electrical Engineering, Faculty of Materials Science, Technology and Design, and Faculty of Computer Science and Mathematics, whereas Faculty of Art, Faculty of Economics, Faculty of Philology and Pedagogics, and Faculty of Health Sciences and Physical Culture represent the Humanities. Students may choose from 27 degree courses (27 undergraduate and 12 graduate) and more than 100 specializations (majors). Many of them are unique in Poland. The university also provides 6 doctoral programmes (economics, fine arts, transport, electrical engineering, mechanics and mechanical engineering and machine building ). The ECTS system is fully implemented and used in each Faculty. Thus, students of the university have the possibility to study abroad at different European universities within the 3 Erasmus Programme. The study period at a foreign university is fully recognized at the Technical University of Radom. The university also accepts foreign students within the Erasmus Programme, too. Students can join students organizations, self-government, any of 36 student scientific associations, sports clubs and the horse-riding club.

== Faculties and courses ==
- Faculty of Materials Science, Technology and Design
- Faculty of Mechanical Engineering
- Faculty of Transport and Electrical Engineering
- Faculty of Economics
- Faculty of Computer Science and Mathematics
- Faculty of Art
- Faculty of Philology and Pedagogy
- Faculty of Health Sciences and Physical Culture

== Academic authorities ==
- Rector - Prof. Zbigniew Łukasik, Ph.D., D.S.
- Vice-Rector for Didactics and Students - Prof. Mirosław Luft, Ph.D., D.S.
- Vice-Rector for Research - Prof. Zbigniew Kosma, Ph.D., D.S.
- Vice-Rector for Human Resources Development and International Cooperation - Prof. Sławomir Bukowski, Ph.D., D.S.
- Chancellor - Mariusz Początek, M.S.
- Vice-Chancellor - Queaestor (Chief Accountant) - Anna Towarek, M.A.
