= Lasocice, Opole Voivodeship =

Lasocice
- Village
- Location within Poland
- Coordinates: 50°32′N 17°27′E
- Country: Poland
- Voivodeship: Opole
- County: Nysa
- Gmina: Łambinowice
- Population: 473

Lasocice [lasɔˈt͡ɕit͡sɛ] (German: Lassoth) is a village in the administrative district of Gmina Łambinowice, within Nysa County, Opole Voivodeship, in south-western Poland.
