= Piątkowice =

- Village
- Location within Poland
- Coordinates: 50°30′43″N 17°27′25″E
- Country: Poland
- Voivodeship: Opole
- County: Nysa
- Gmina: Łambinowice
- Population: 370

Piątkowice [pjɔntkɔˈvit͡sɛ] (German: Rothhaus) is a village in the administrative district of Gmina Łambinowice, within Nysa County, Opole Voivodeship, in south-western Poland.
