= Jasienica Dolna =

- Village
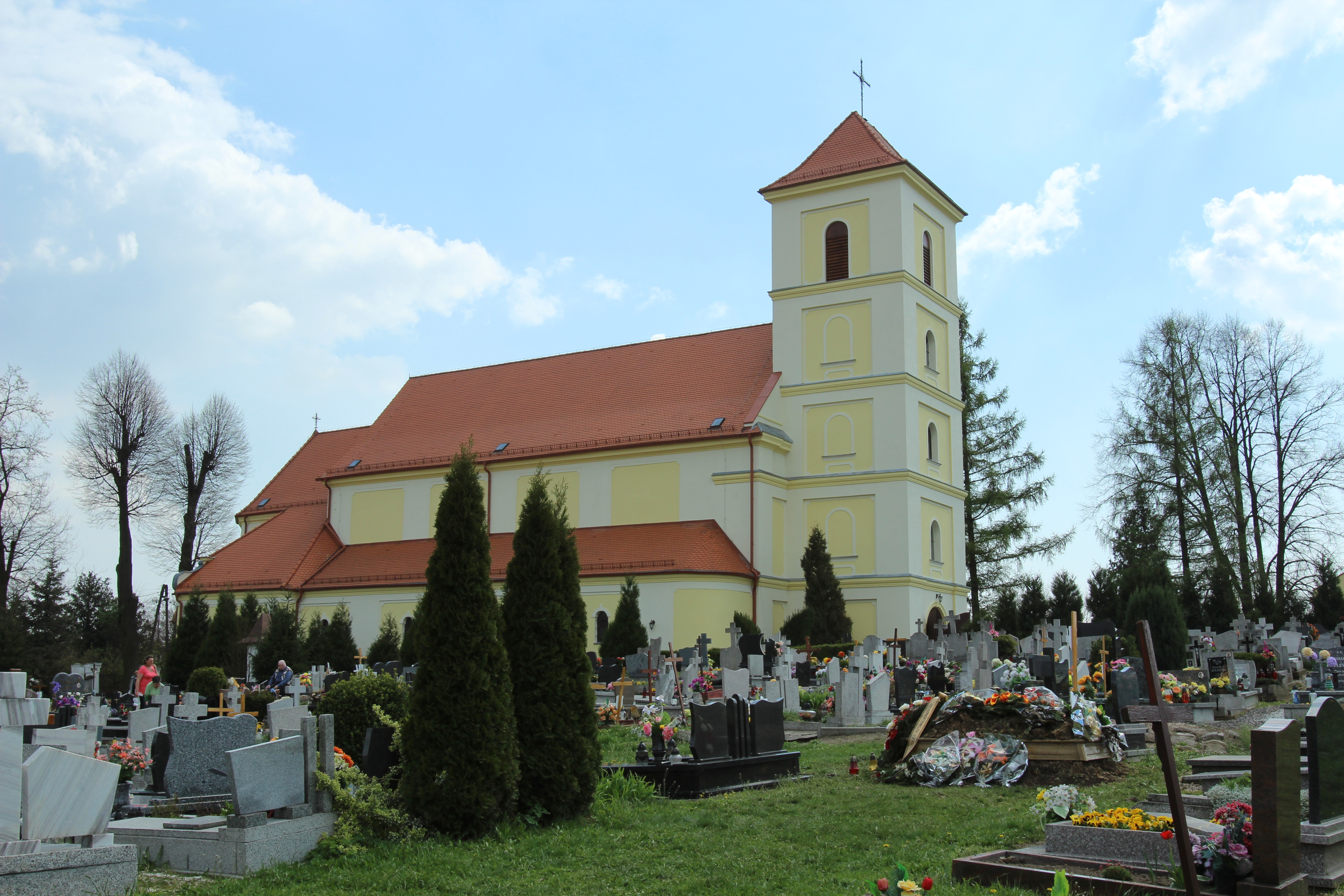

- Location within Poland
- Coordinates: 50°31′N 17°30′E
- Country: Poland
- Voivodeship: Opole
- County: Nysa
- Gmina: Łambinowice
- Population: 920

Jasienica Dolna [jaɕɛˈnit͡sa ˈdɔlna] (German: Nieder Hermsdorf) is a village in the administrative district of Gmina Łambinowice, within Nysa County, Opole Voivodeship, in south-western Poland.
