= Wierzbie, Nysa County =

Wierzbie
- Village
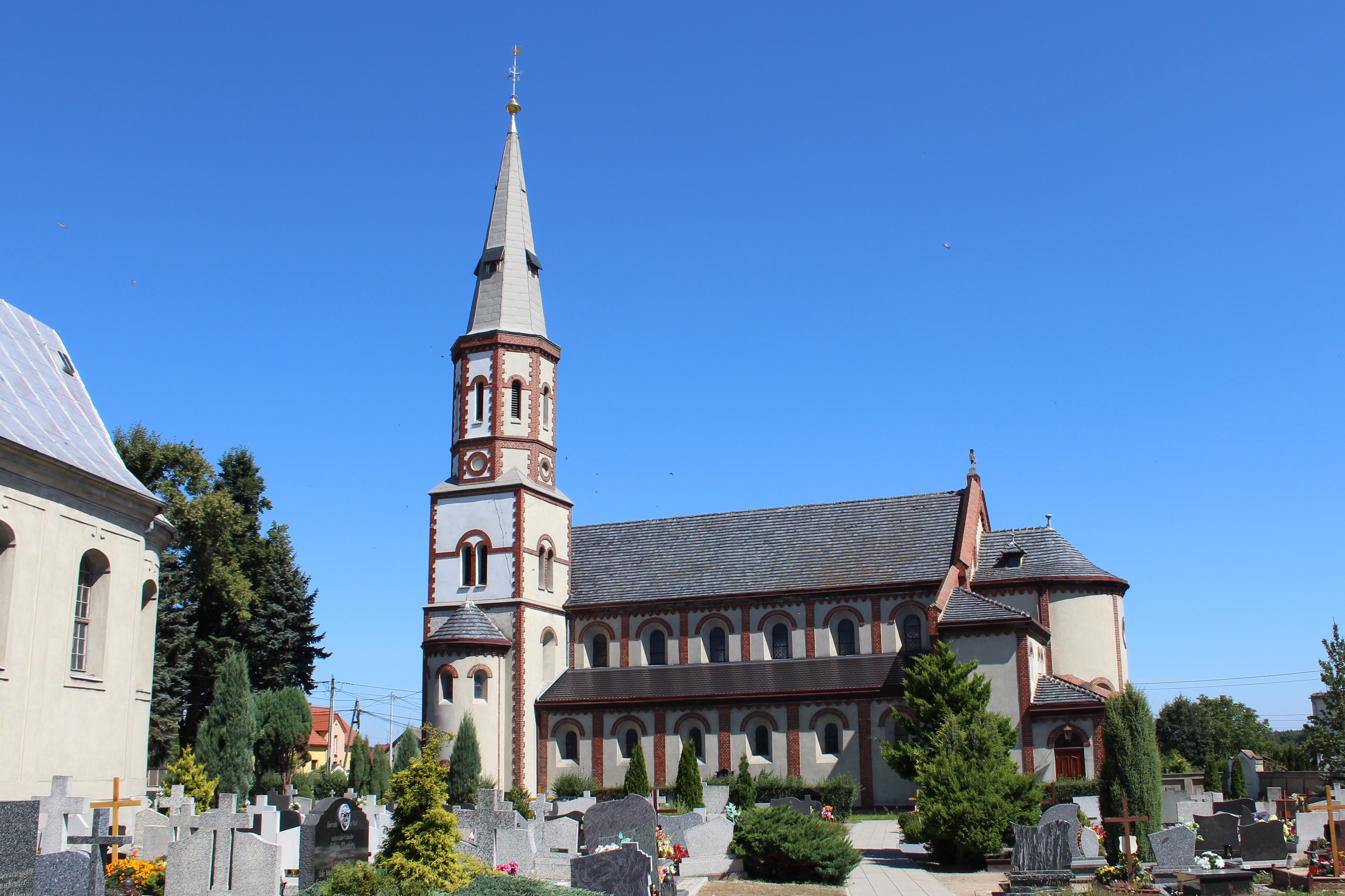
- Holy Cross Church in Wierzbie

- Location within Poland
- Coordinates: 50°32′0″N 17°36′0″E
- Country: Poland
- Voivodeship: Opole
- County: Nysa
- Gmina: Łambinowice
- Elevation: 200 m (660 ft)
- Population: 639
- Time zone: UTC+1 (CET)
  - Summer (DST): UTC+2 (CEST)
- Vehicle registration: ONY

Wierzbie [ˈvjɛʐbjɛ] (German: Wiersbel) is a village in the administrative district of Gmina Łambinowice, within Nysa County, Opole Voivodeship, in southern Poland.

== History ==
In the 10th century the area became part of the emerging Polish state. According to linguist Heinrich Adamy the name is of Polish origin, and comes from the word wierzba, which means "willow". Later on, the village fell to Bohemia (Czechia), then Prussia, and Germany. In 1936, during a massive Nazi campaign of renaming of placenames, the village was renamed to Weidengut to erase traces of Polish origin. During World War II, the Germans operated the E475 forced labour subcamp of the nearby Stalag VIII-B/344 prisoner-of-war camp in the village. Following the defeat of Germany in the war, in 1945, the village became again part of Poland and its historic name was restored.
