= Szadurczyce =

- Village
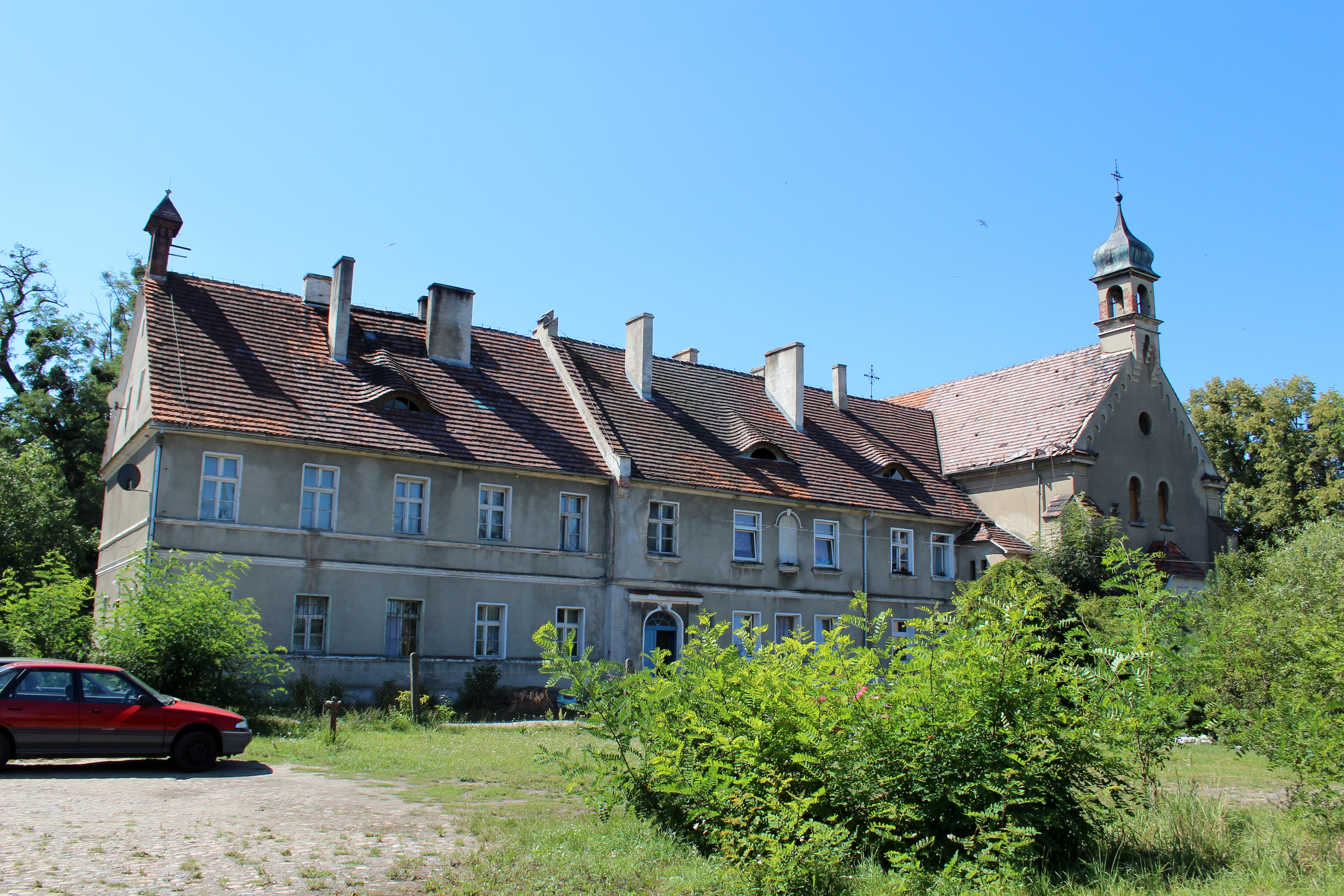

- Location within Poland
- Coordinates: 50°34′N 17°33′E
- Country: Poland
- Voivodeship: Opole
- County: Nysa
- Gmina: Łambinowice

Szadurczyce [ʂadurˈt͡ʂɨt͡sɛ] (German: Schaderwitz) is a village in the administrative district of Gmina Łambinowice, within Nysa County, Opole Voivodeship, in south-western Poland.
