= Malerzowice Wielkie =

- Village
- Location within Poland
- Coordinates: 50°35′N 17°29′E
- Country: Poland
- Voivodeship: Opole
- County: Nysa
- Gmina: Łambinowice
- Population: 475
- Website: http://www.lambinowice.pl/?id=1786

Malerzowice Wielkie [malɛʐɔˈvit͡sɛ ˈvjɛlkʲɛ] (German: Gross Mahlendorf) is a village in the administrative district of Gmina Łambinowice, within Nysa County, Opole Voivodeship, in south-western Poland.
