= Bielice, Nysa County =

Bielice
- Village
- Location within Poland
- Coordinates: 50°33′N 17°30′E
- Country: Poland
- Voivodeship: Opole
- County: Nysa
- Gmina: Łambinowice

Bielice [bjɛˈlit͡sɛ] (German: Bielitz) is a village in the administrative district of Gmina Łambinowice, within Nysa County, Opole Voivodeship, in south-western Poland.
