= Gmina Łambinowice =

Gmina Łambinowice Łambinowice Commune
- Gmina
- Flag Coat of arms
- Interactive map of Gmina Łambinowice
- Coordinates (Łambinowice): 50°32′18″N 17°33′14″E
- Country: Poland
- Voivodeship: Opole
- County: Nysa
- Seat: Łambinowice

Area
  - Total: 123.71 km^{2} (47.76 sq mi)

Population (2019-06-30)
  - Total: 7,494
  - Density: 60.58/km^{2} (156.9/sq mi)
- Website: http://www.lambinowice.pl

Gmina Łambinowice is a rural gmina (administrative district) in Nysa County, Opole Voivodeship, in south-western Poland. Its seat is the village of Łambinowice, which lies approximately 18 kilometres (11 mi) north-east of Nysa and 31 km (19 mi) south-west of the regional capital Opole.

The gmina covers an area of 123.71 square kilometres (47.8 sq mi), and as of 2019 its total population was 7,494.

== Villages ==
Gmina Łambinowice contains the villages and settlements of Bielice, Budzieszowice, Drogoszów, Jasienica Dolna, Łambinowice, Lasocice, Malerzowice Wielkie, Mańkowice, Piątkowice, Sowin, Szadurczyce and Wierzbie.

== Neighbouring gminas ==
Gmina Łambinowice is bordered by the gminas of Korfantów, Niemodlin, Nysa, Pakosławice, Skoroszyce and Tułowice.

== Twin towns – sister cities ==
Gmina Łambinowice is twinned with:

- Kamenná, Czech Republic
