= Drogoszów =

- Village
- Location within Poland
- Coordinates: 50°31′56″N 17°29′00″E
- Country: Poland
- Voivodeship: Opole
- County: Nysa
- Gmina: Łambinowice

Drogoszów [drɔˈɡɔʂuf] (German: Neusorge) is a village in the administrative district of Gmina Łambinowice, within Nysa County, Opole Voivodeship, in south-western Poland.
