= Kamenná (Šumperk District) =

- Municipality
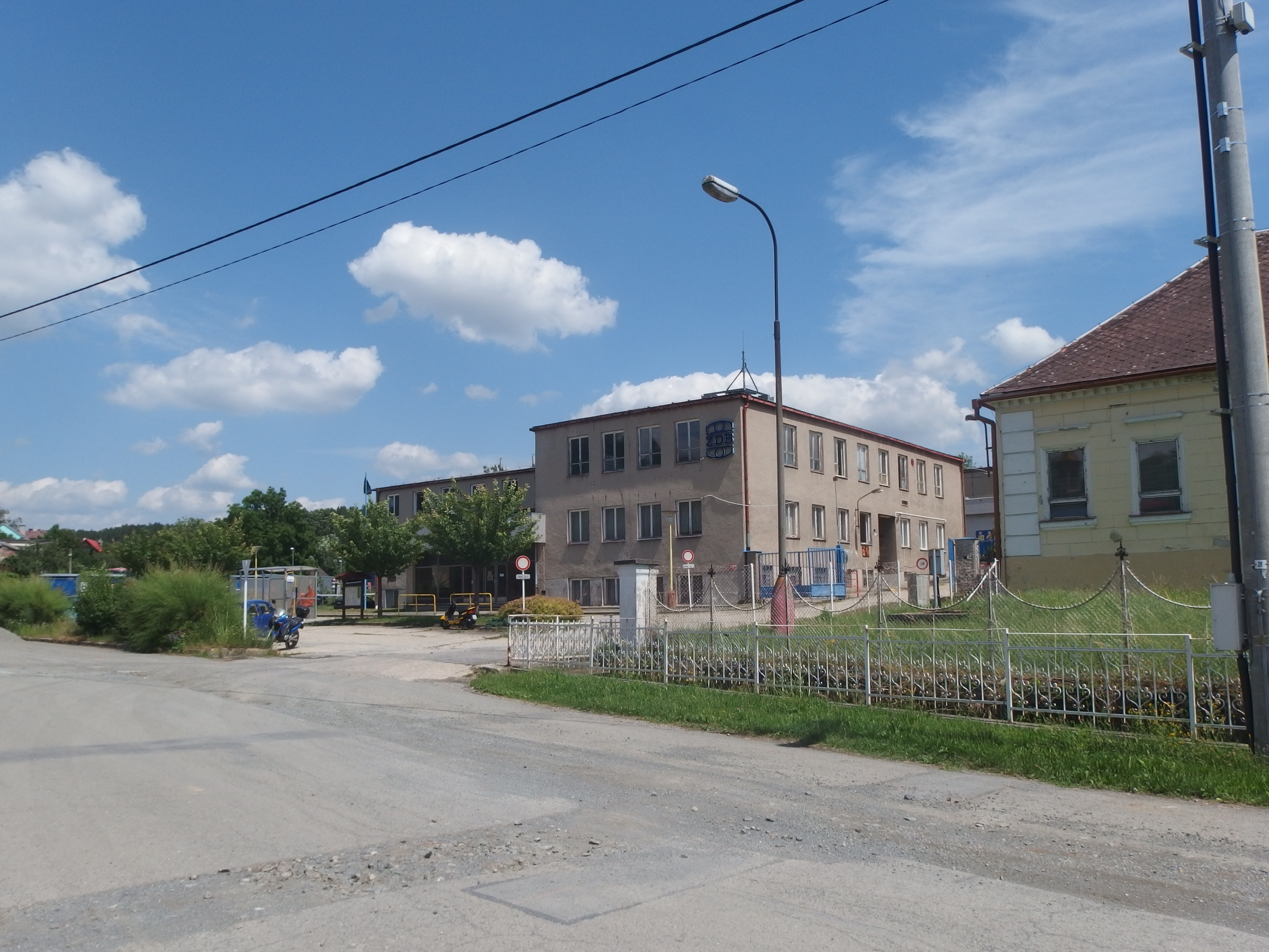
- Centre of Kamenná

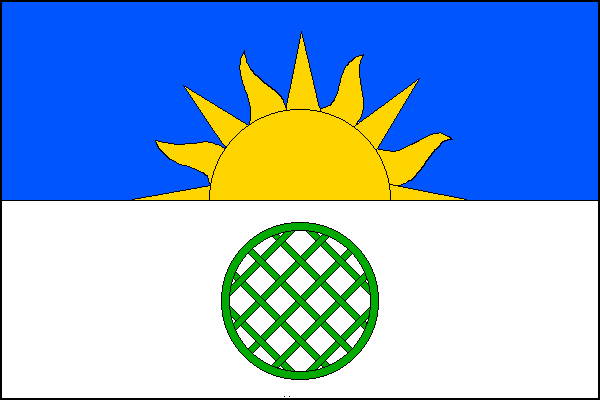
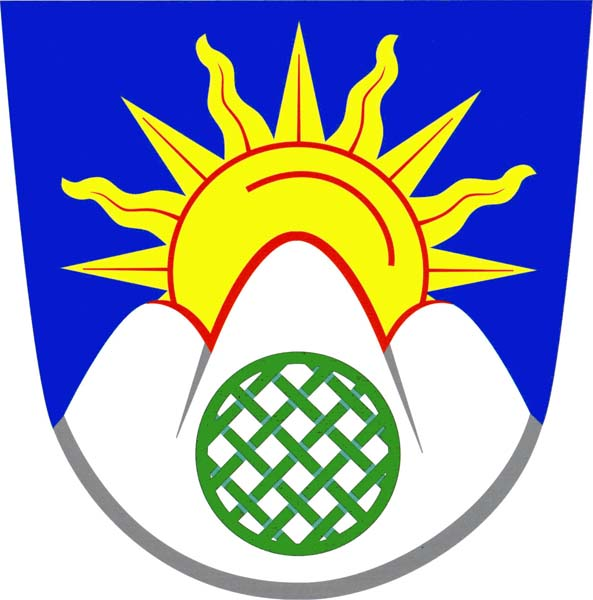
- Flag Coat of arms

- Location in the Czech Republic
- Coordinates: 49°51′34″N 17°1′52″E
- Country: Czech Republic
- Region: Olomouc
- District: Šumperk
- First mentioned: 1385

Area
  - Total: 5.12 km^{2} (1.98 sq mi)
- Elevation: 386 m (1,266 ft)

Population (2026-01-01)
  - Total: 475
  - Density: 92.8/km^{2} (240/sq mi)
- Time zone: UTC+1 (CET)
  - Summer (DST): UTC+2 (CEST)
- Postal codes: 789 74
- Website: www.obec-kamenna.cz

Kamenná (German: Steine) is a municipality and village in Šumperk District in the Olomouc Region of the Czech Republic. It has about 500 inhabitants.

Kamenná lies approximately 13 kilometres (8 mi) south of Šumperk, 34 km (21 mi) north-west of Olomouc, and 189 km (117 mi) east of Prague.

== Demographics ==
Historical population
Year	Pop.	±%
1869	534	—
1880	505	−5.4%
1890	554	+9.7%
1900	553	−0.2%
1910	530	−4.2%
1921	452	−14.7%
1930	449	−0.7%
1950	367	−18.3%
1961	429	+16.9%
1970	492	+14.7%
1980	674	+37.0%
1991	635	−5.8%
2001	577	−9.1%
2011	520	−9.9%
2021	480	−7.7%
Source: Censuses

== Twin towns – sister cities ==
Kamenná is twinned with:

- Łambinowice, Poland
