= Groszek =

Polish retail chain

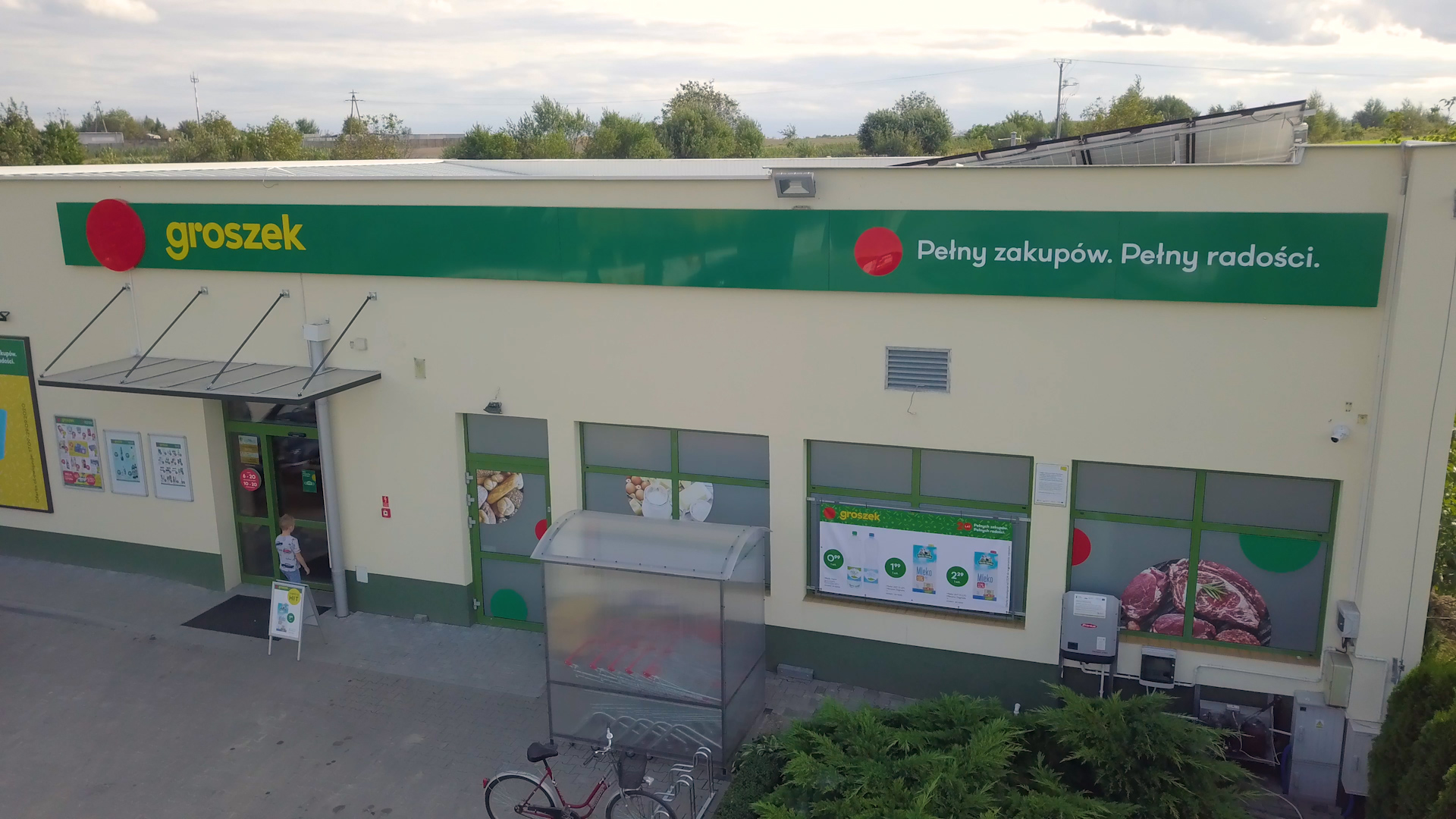

- Company type: Retailers' cooperative
- Industry: Retail
- Founded: 2000
- Headquarters: Lublin, Poland
- Area served: Poland
- Net income: zl 1,385 million
- Members: 1250
- Number of employees: ~7500
- Parent: Eurocash
- Website: www.groszek.com.pl

Groszek is a brand and franchise of independent retailers (primarily small grocery shops) in Poland. The chain was founded in 2000, the organiser and owner of the chain is Eurocash. The chain is made up of over 1250 convenience stores, the average size of each store is 125,5 m².

In 2013, the chain was awarded the Hermes award by the business journal „Poradnik Handlowca”, for "the distribution firms, retail, independent shop owners, as well as people which in the past few years imposed great influence in the development of the brand."

== Structure ==
Groszek is among the 32 recipients of the "Created in Poland" award for 2014/15 period from Superbrands Polska.

- Net Income for 2008: zl 1,385 million
- Per cent of shopping carried out centrally: 70% from organised delivery sources
- Average size of each store: 125.5 m²
- Average value of each shopping basket: zl 8-12
- Total number of employees: ~7500
- Average number of employees per shop: 6 people

== Gallery ==
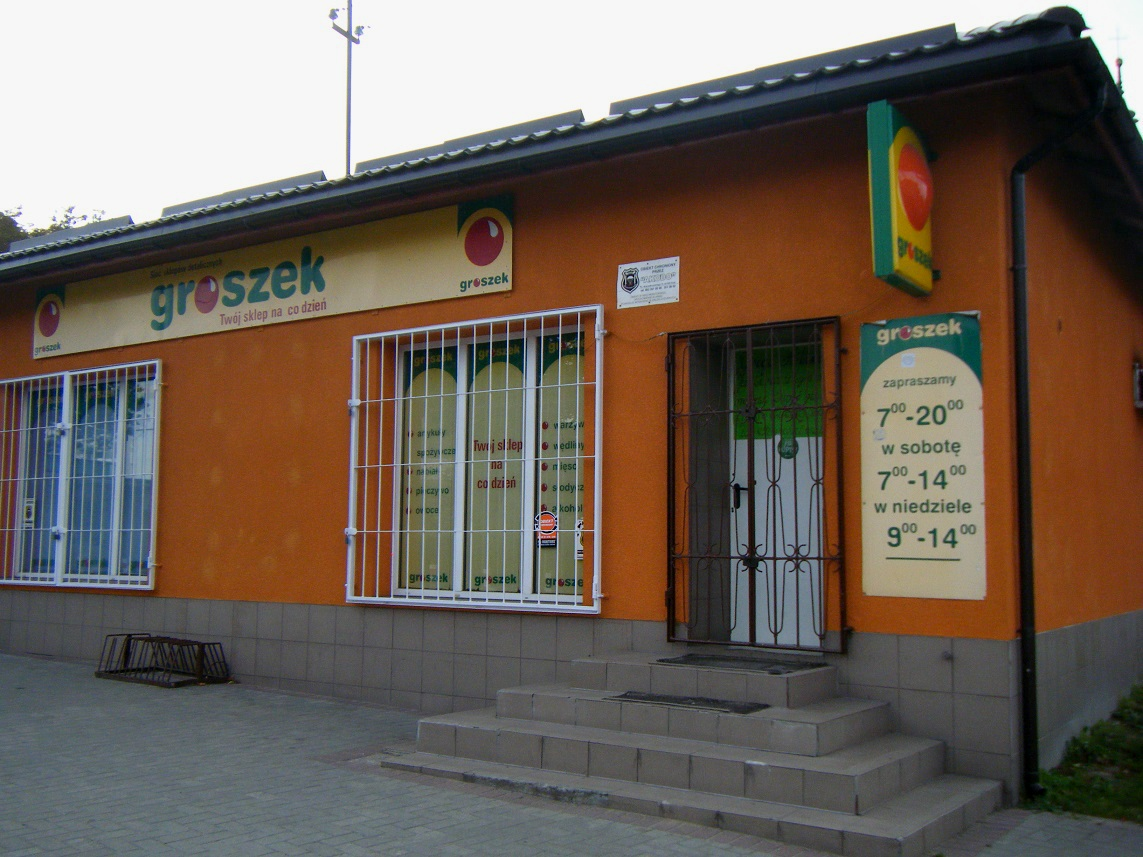
A Groszek store in Brdów

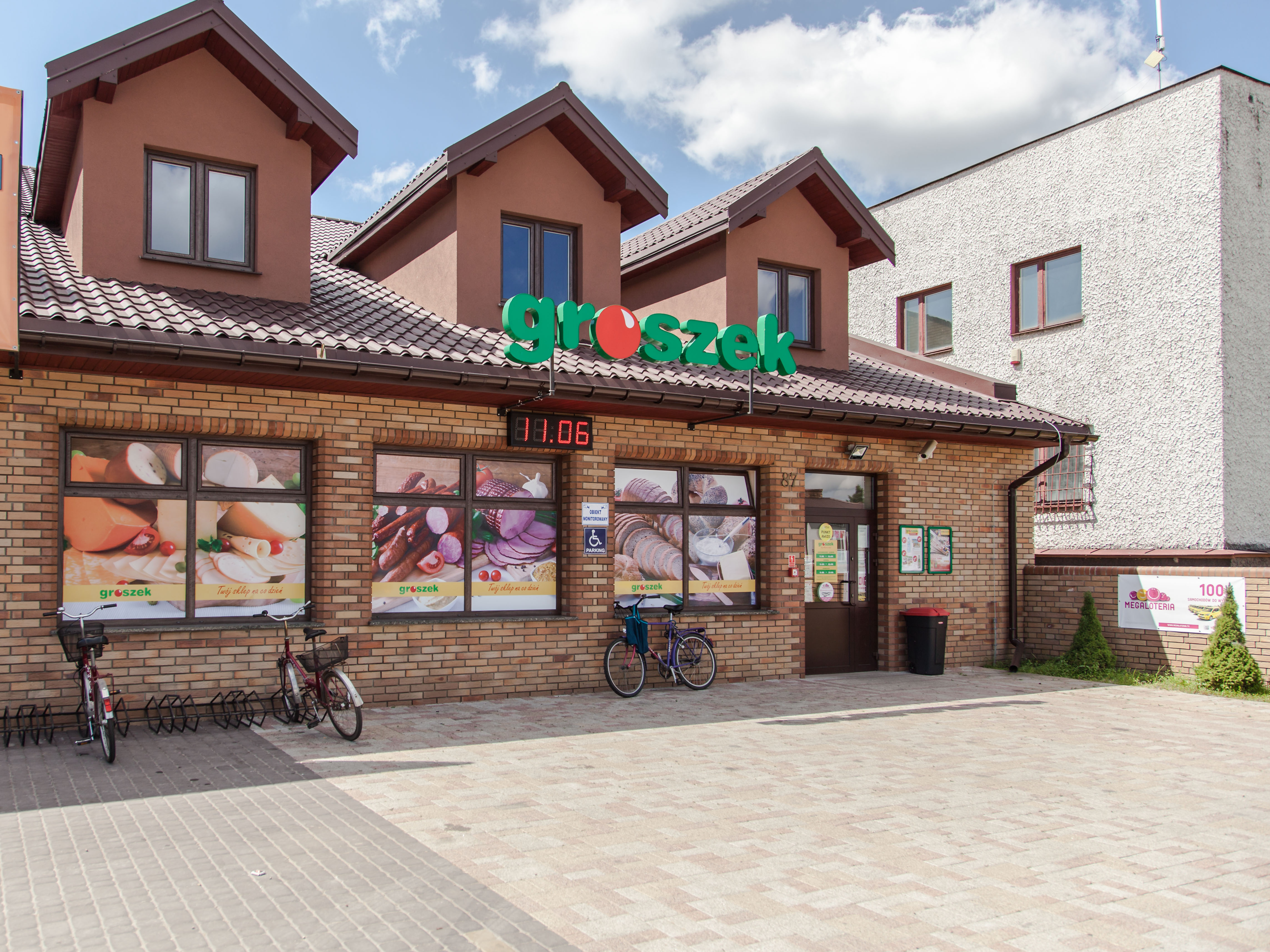
A Groszek store in Sosnowica

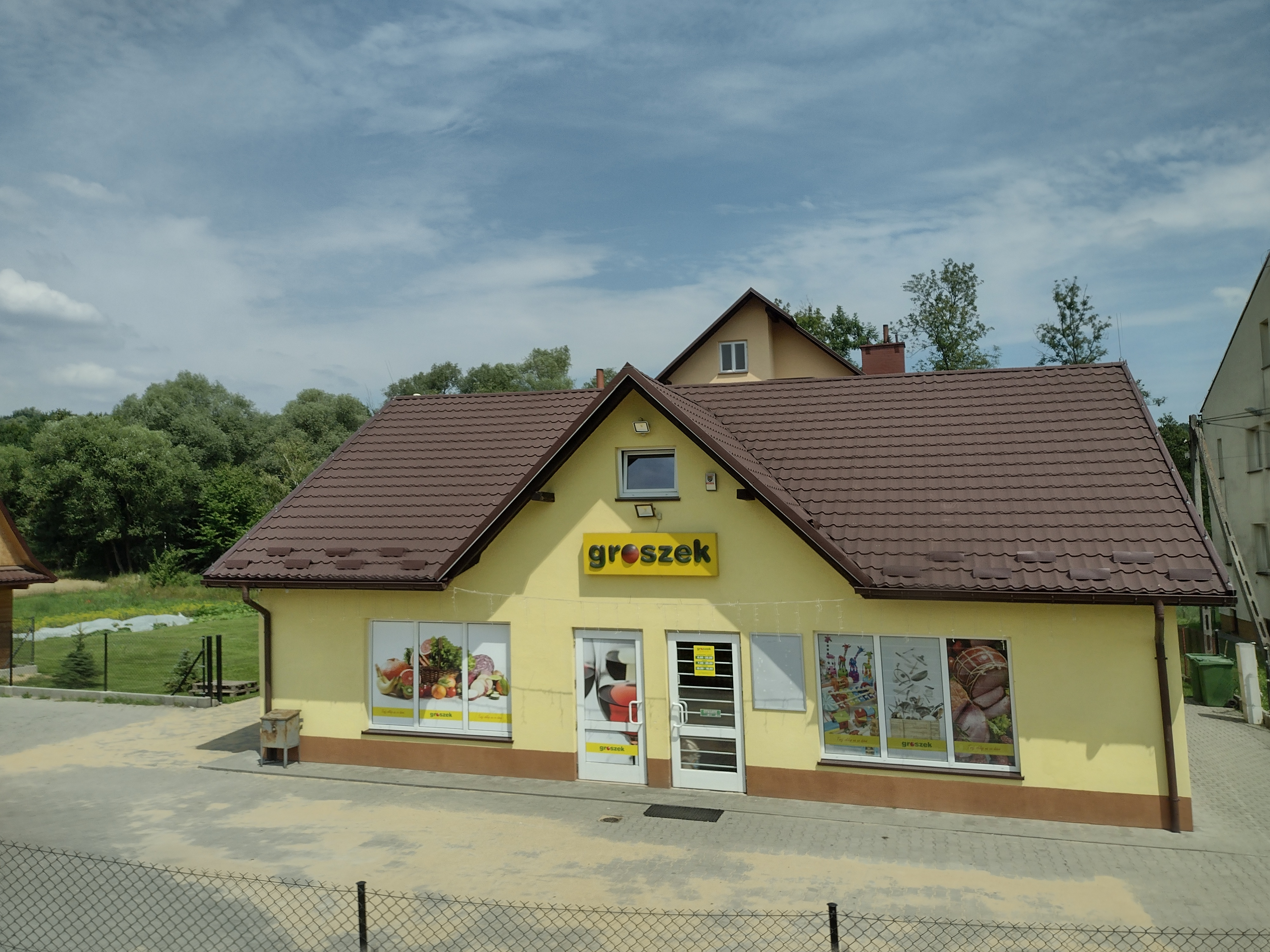
A Groszek store in Lipiec

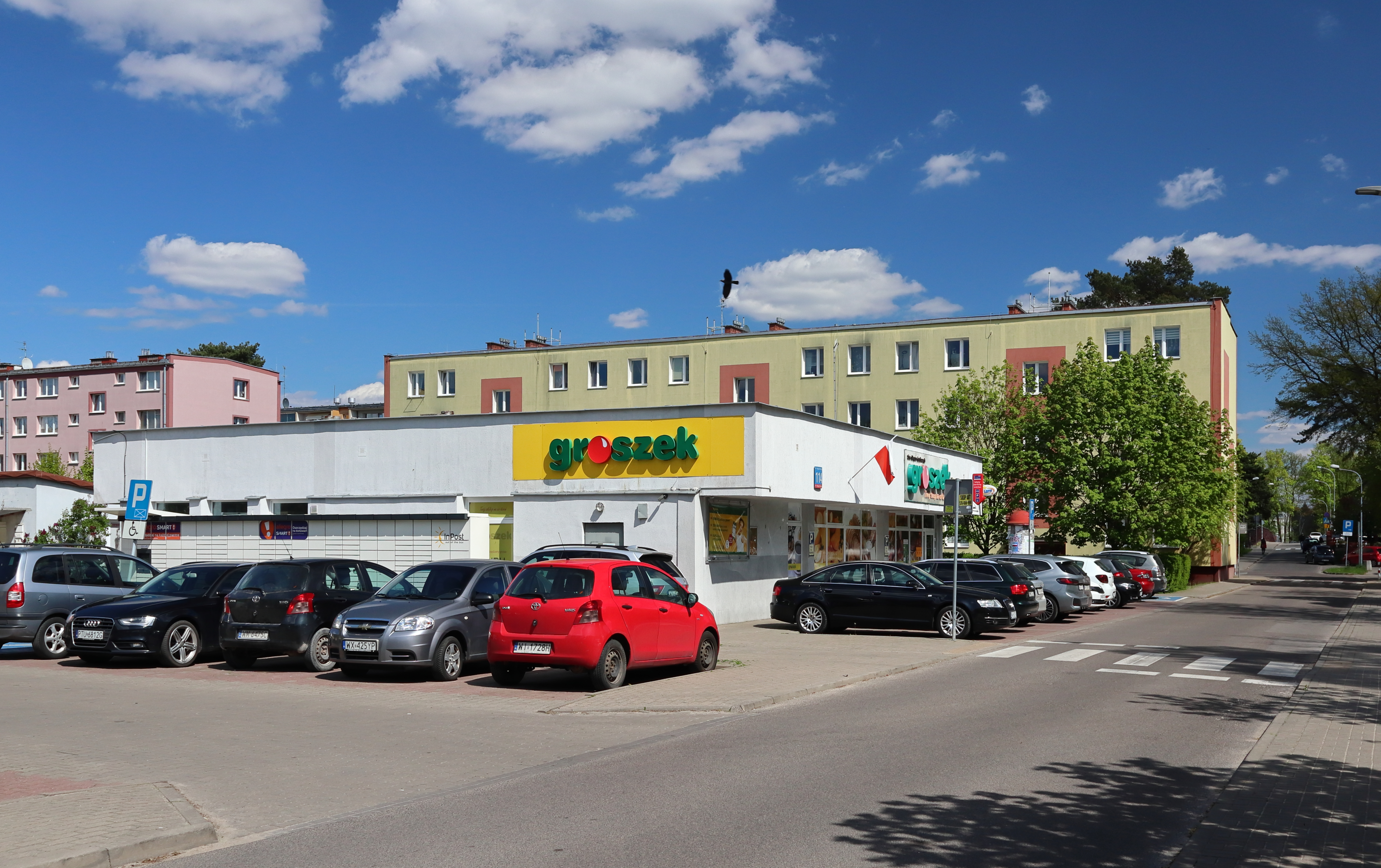
A Groszek store in Warsaw

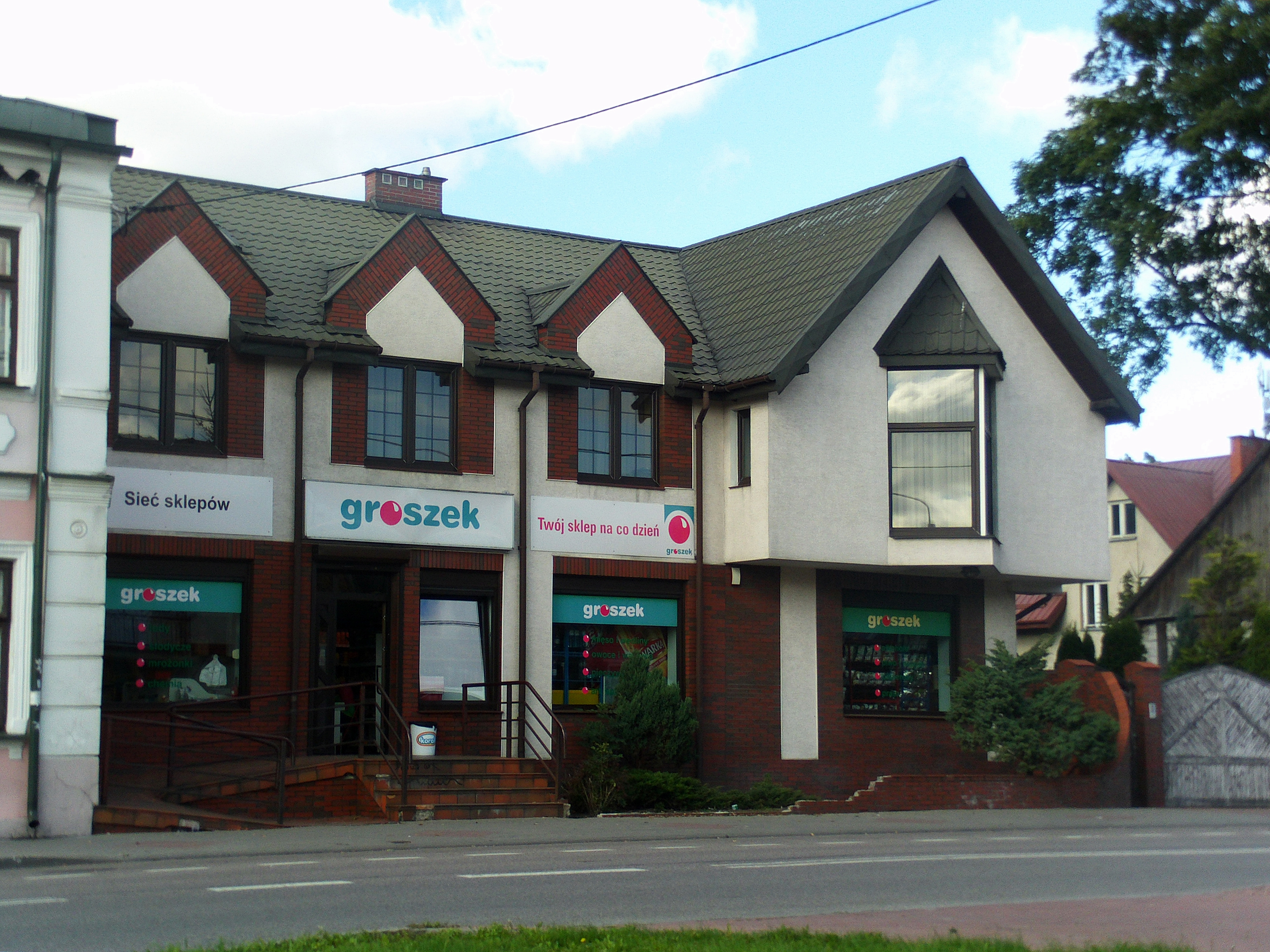
A Groszek store in Suwałki

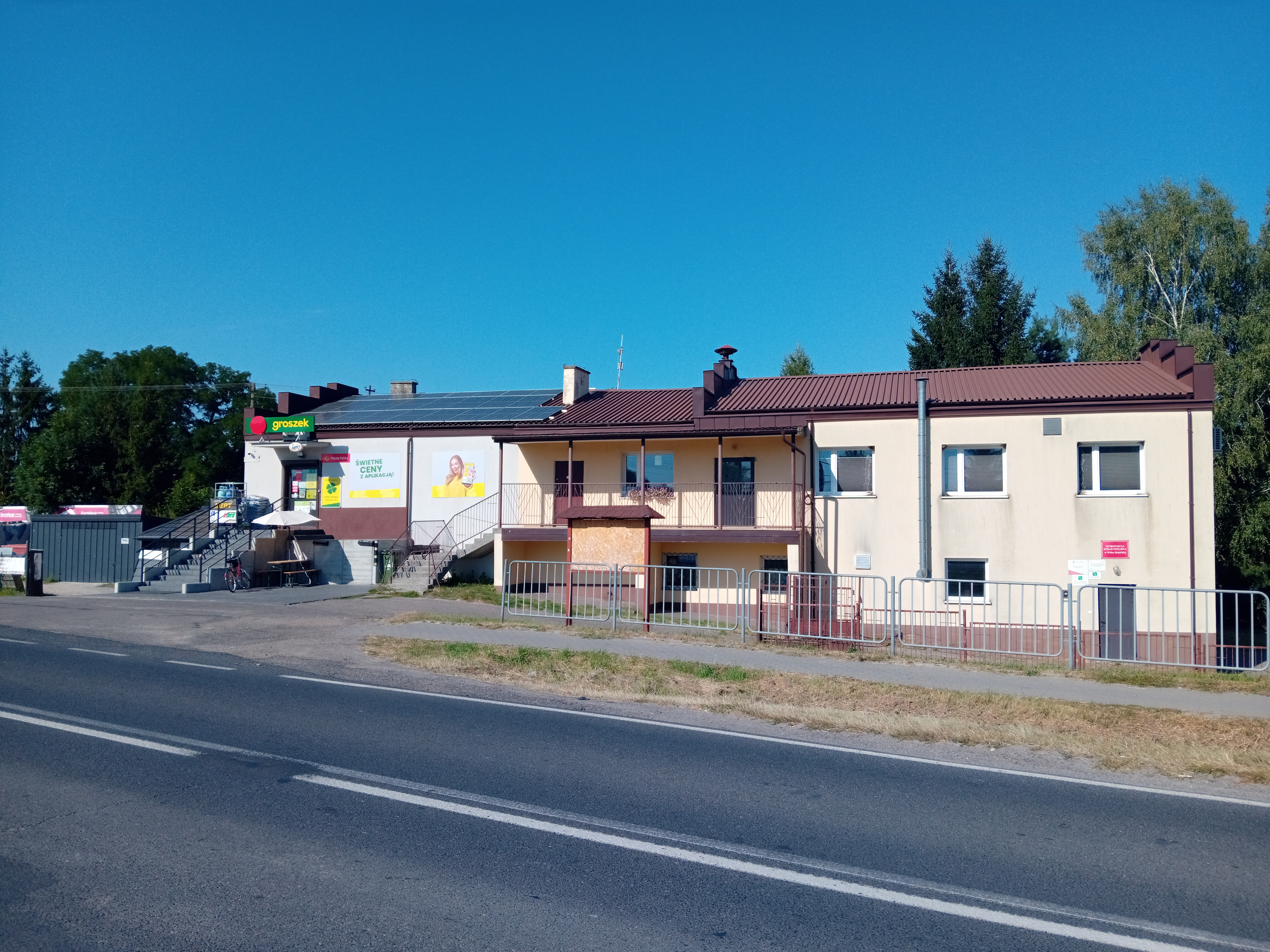
A Groszek store in Wólka Rokicka-Kolonia
