= Topaz (convenience store) =

Polish supermarket chain

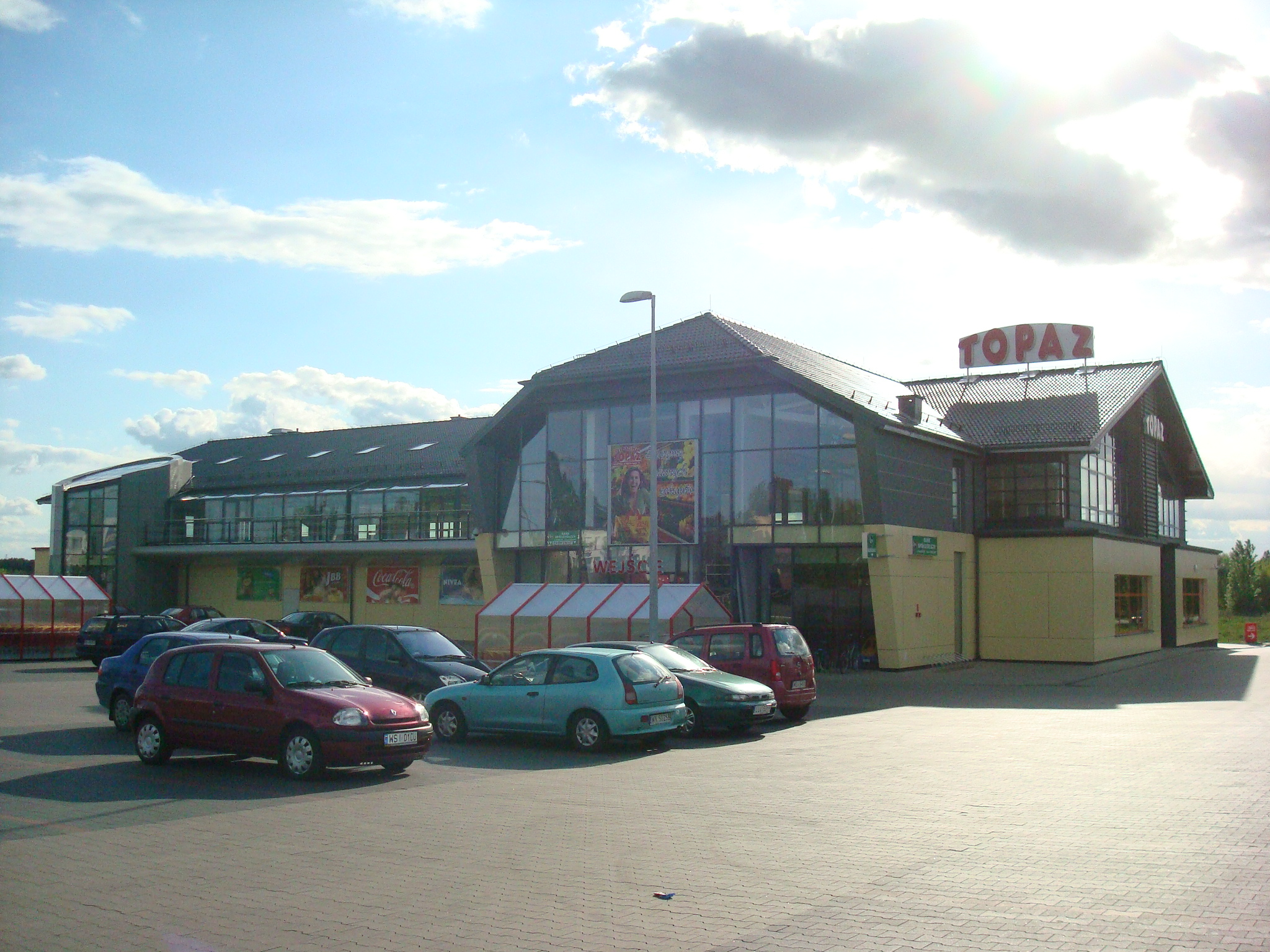
- Company type: Limited liability company
- Founded: 1993
- Founder: Zbigniew Paczóski
- Headquarters: Poland
- Number of employees: 2,000+

Topaz is a Polish supermarket in Eastern Poland. The company was founded in 1993, by Zbigniew Paczóski and the head office is located in Sokołów Podlaski.

== Beginnings ==
Initially, the company operated from one shop (originally in a converted garage) by the owner, in which he supplied the local residents with basic food and industry products. With time, more stores began to appear.

=== Topaz Express ===
In May 2009, the network introduced a new sales style - Topaz Express franchise stores.

== Currently ==
Currently, the network consists of 45 retail outlets in 20 towns and around 30 Topaz Express franchise outlets, a company's confectionery and 2 fuel stations.
