= Mańkowice =

- Village
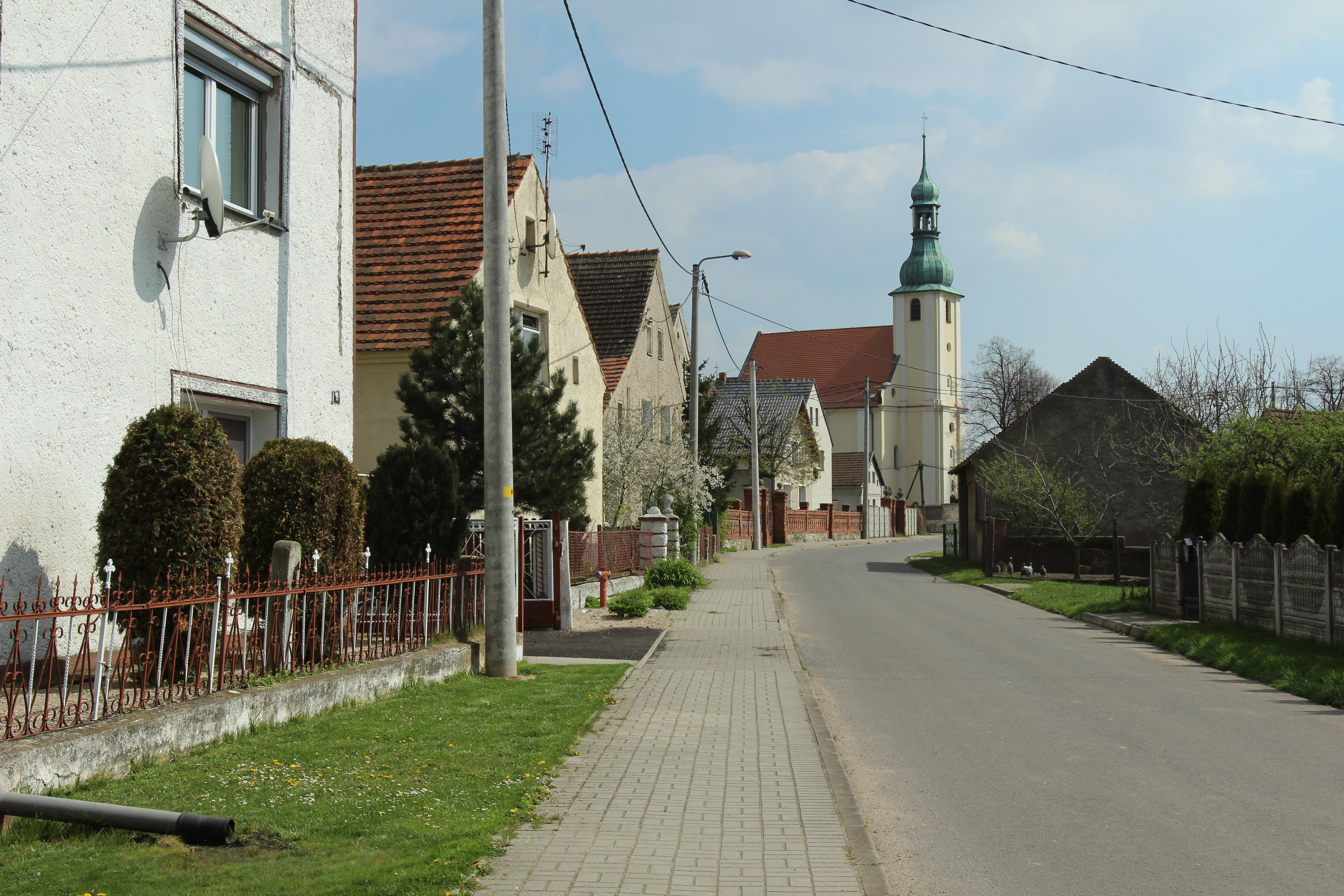

- Location within Poland
- Coordinates: 50°29′41″N 17°28′42″E
- Country: Poland
- Voivodeship: Opole
- County: Nysa
- Gmina: Łambinowice
- Population (approx.): 700
- Website: http://www.psp-mankowice.ardh.org

Mańkowice [maɲkɔˈvit͡sɛ] (German: Mannsdorf) is a village in the administrative district of Gmina Łambinowice, within Nysa County, Opole Voivodeship, in south-western Poland.
