= Eurocash =

Polish corporate group

Eurocash S.A.
- Company type: Spółka Akcyjna
- Traded as: WSE: EUR
- Industry: Retail
- Founded: 1993; 33 years ago
- Headquarters: Komorniki, Poland
- Area served: Poland
- Key people: Paweł Surówka (President of the Management Board); Luis Amaral (Chairman of the Supervisory Board))
- Revenue: 5,309,000,000 euro (2018)
- Net income: 26,000,000 euro (2018)
- Number of employees: 21,873 (2018)
- Website: eurocash.pl

Eurocash S.A. is a Polish corporate group holding numerous enterprises, inter alia: Eurocash Cash&Carry, Eurocash Serwis as well as the retail chains of ABC, 1 minute, Delikatesy Centrum, Groszek, Lewiatan and Mila. The largest share holder (44%) of the company is the Portuguese Luis Amaral, who in 2003 acquired a share in his former employer Jerónimo Martins. Since February 2005, Eurocash holds a place on the Warsaw Stock Exchange.

== Eurocash Group ==
The joint-stock company Eurocash S.A. is the dominant entity of the Eurocash Group, which apart from owning business units, holds franchise networks: ABC, Delikatesy Centrum, Polska Sieć Handlowa Lewiatan, Euro Sklep, Groszek as well as the drugstore Drogerie Koliber. Eurocash also possesses other enterprises: Partnerski Serwis Detaliczny S.A., DEF cash and carry stores, chemical and cosmetics company Ambra. Eurocash S.A. groups some of its enterprises under the following business units:

- Eurocash Cash&Carry - a retail chain of over 160 wholesalers, specialising in small to mid-sized grocery-chemical stores. The business unit is the franchise operator of the grocery stores "Sieć Sklepów ABC" - with over 6100 stores, it is the largest retail chain of small neighbourhood stores in Poland.
- Eurocash Franczyza - a business unit operating the retail stores franchise Delikatesy Centrum, with over 800 stores as of 2014. the largest concentration of stores is located in south-eastern Poland.
- Eurocash Dystrybucja - the leading Polish distributor of consumer packaged goods to petrol stations and corner shops. It is the leading distributor of consumer packaged goods in Poland. The company disposes of 500 thousand square-metres of department space and a line of 650 transport vehicles. In April 2014, Eurocash S.A. merged with Tradis Sp. z o.o., the latter as a consequence transforming into Eurocash Dystrybucja.
- Eurocash Gastronomia - the leading Polish distributor of consumer packaged goods to the hotel, restaurant and catering market. The company specialises in the distribution of goods to middle-class restaurants (casual dining) as well as fast food chains, workers' cafeterias and hotels.
- Eurocash Serwis - the leading Polish company specialising in the production and distribution of coffee, tea, cigarettes, tobacco, candy, batteries, mobile 'phone cards as well as medicine available without prescription. The company has over 130 subsidiaries.
- PolCater - a company specialising in the gastronomy market. The company supplies restaurant chains, cafeterias and hotels.
- PSD - Partnerski Serwis Detaliczny - the partnership is associated with the consumers' co-operative Społem. The PSD Group founded the association of nationwide retail stores Gama.
- PayUp Polska - a joint venture founded by Portuguese company Pay Up Desenvolvimento and the Eurocash Group. The company distributes electronic services to customers, which are realised via electronic terminals. The company provides pay and go top-up for mobile 'phones, the payment of bills (e.g. for gas, electricity, telephones and homes). The service accepts electronic payments, cashback and online payment via paysafecard.

== See also ==
- Warsaw Stock Exchange
- WIG30
- Economy of Poland
