= Waldemar Nowakowski =

Polish politician

member of Sejm 2005-2007
- In office 25 September 2005 – 2007

Personal details
- Born: 13 January 1950 (age 76)
- Party: Samoobrona

Waldemar Nowakowski (born 13 January 1950 in Przemysław) is a Polish politician. He was elected to Sejm on 25 September 2005, getting 4170 votes in 5 Toruń district as a candidate from the Samoobrona Rzeczpospolitej Polskiej list.

== See also ==
- Members of Polish Sejm 2005-2007
