= Adamowitz =

Adamowitz may refer to:

- A former name of Adamowice, Opole Voivodeship, Poland
- A former name of Adamowice, Silesian Voivodeship, Poland
- Kolonie Adamowitz former name of Farska Kolonia, Poland
