= Banatki Duże =

Polish village

- Village
- Location within Poland
- Coordinates: 50°37′10″N 18°16′34″E
- Country: Poland
- Voivodeship: Opole
- County: Strzelce
- Gmina: Strzelce Opolskie

Banatki Duże [baˈnatki ˈduʐɛ] is a village in the administrative district of Gmina Strzelce Opolskie, within Strzelce County, Opole Voivodeship, in south-western Poland.
