= Mokre Łany =

- Neighbourhood of Strzelce Opolskie
- Location within Poland
- Coordinates: 50°30′37″N 18°18′07″E
- Country: Poland
- Voivodeship: Opole
- County: Strzelce
- Gmina: Strzelce Opolskie
- Town: Strzelce Opolskie

Population
  - Total: 790
- Time zone: UTC+1 (CET)
  - Summer (DST): UTC+2 (CEST)
- Vehicle registration: OST

Mokre Łany [ˈmɔkrɛ ˈwanɨ] is a neighbourhood of the town of Strzelce Opolskie, in southern Poland.
