= Groszów =

Groszów Biedacz
- Village
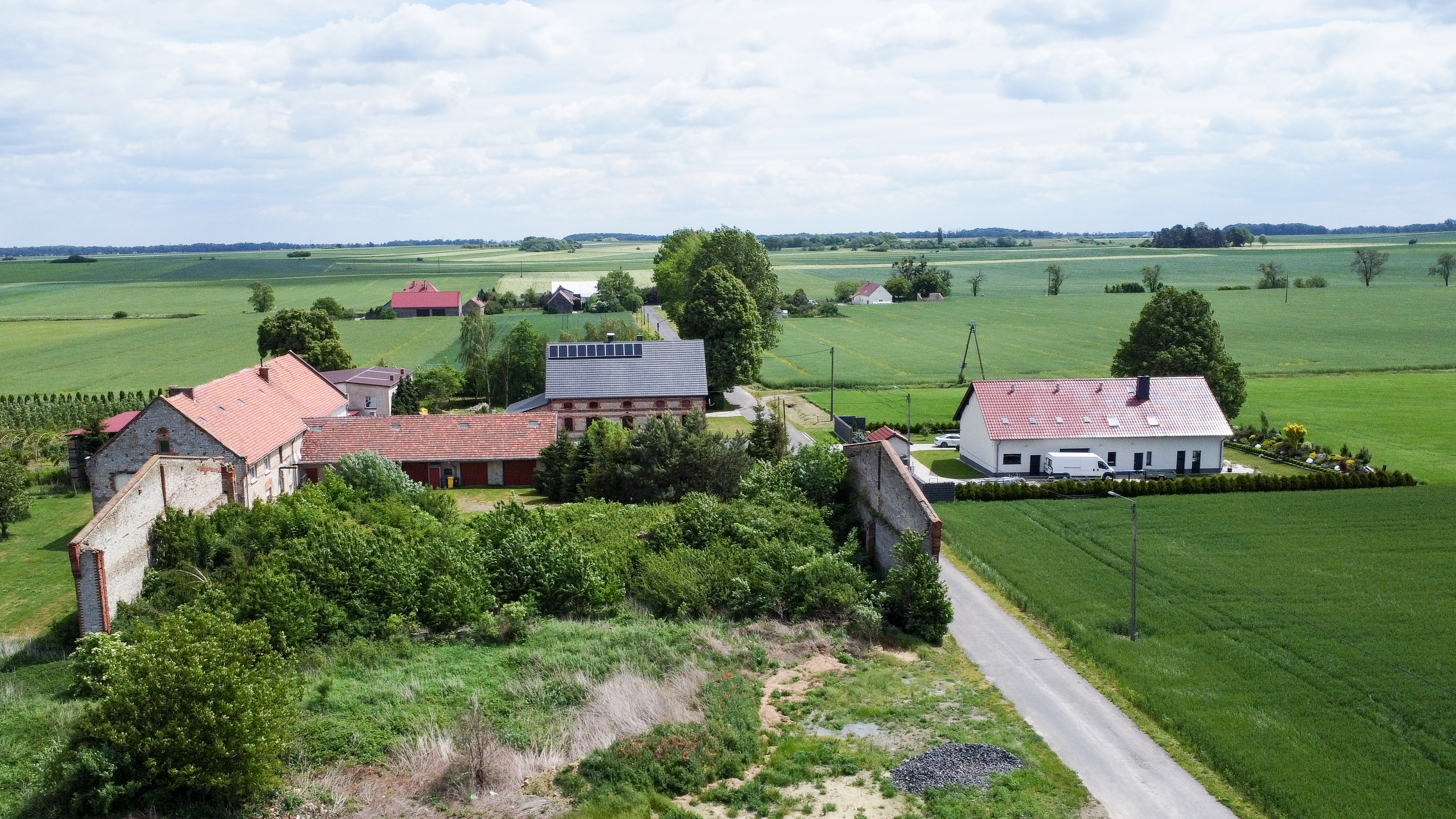

- Location within Poland
- Coordinates: 50°29′23″N 18°14′14″E
- Country: Poland
- Voivodeship: Opole
- County: Strzelce
- Gmina: Strzelce Opolskie
- Time zone: UTC+1 (CET)
  - Summer (DST): UTC+2
- Postal code: 47-161
- Area code: +4877
- Vehicle registration: OST

Groszów (German: Reilshof), additional name: Biedacz, is a village in the administrative district of Gmina Strzelce Opolskie, within Strzelce County, Opole Voivodeship, south-western Poland.
