= Kalinów, Opole Voivodeship =

Kalinów
- Village
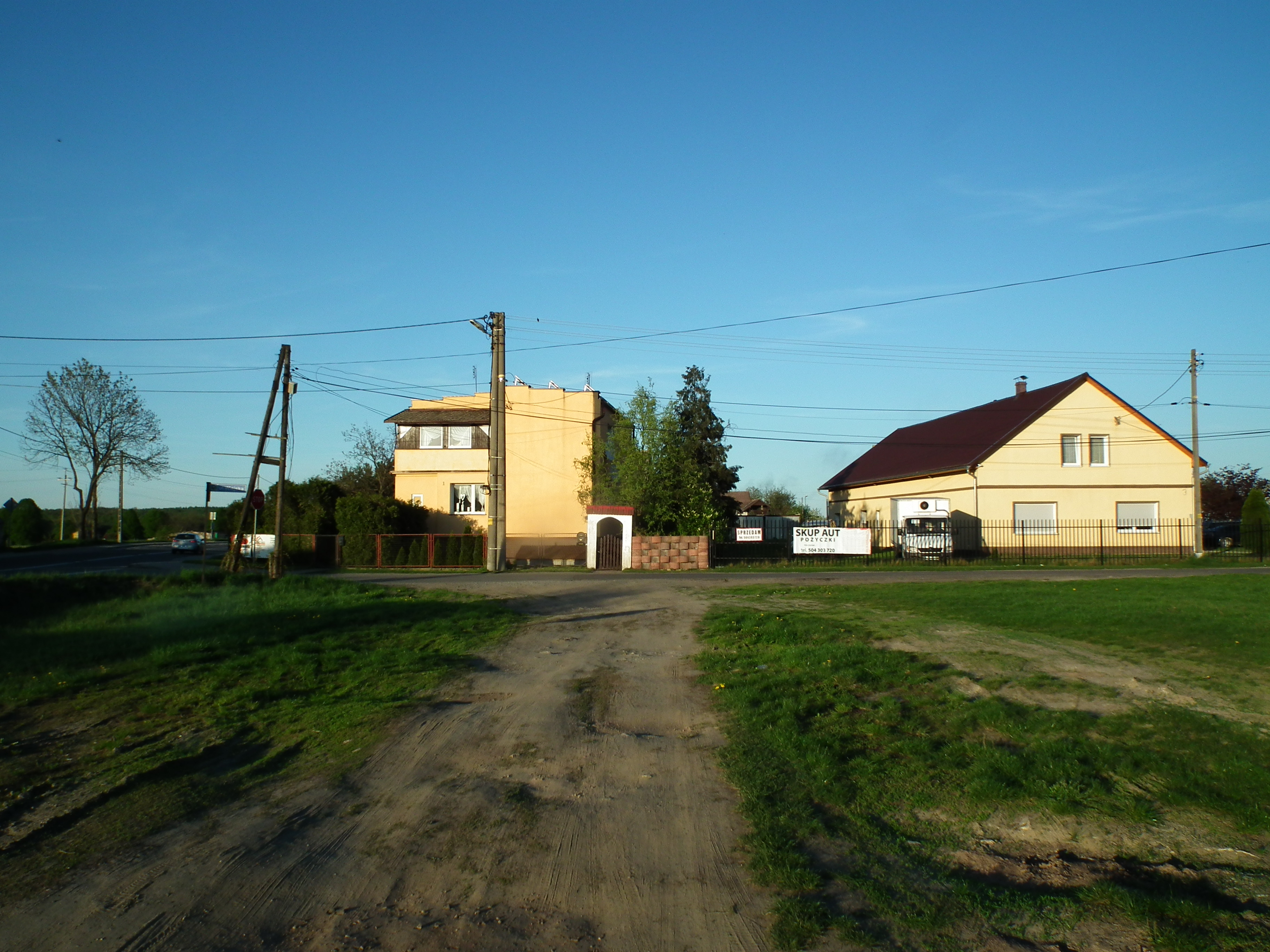

- Location within Poland
- Coordinates: 50°30′08″N 18°12′15″E
- Country: Poland
- Voivodeship: Opole
- County: Strzelce
- Gmina: Strzelce Opolskie

Population (2021)
  - Total: 246
- Time zone: UTC+1 (CET)
  - Summer (DST): UTC+2
- Postal code: 47-100
- Area code: +4877
- Vehicle registration: OST

Kalinów (German: Kalinow) is a village in the administrative district of Gmina Strzelce Opolskie, within Strzelce County, Opole Voivodeship, south-western Poland. It is situated in the historical region of Upper Silesia.

As of 31 December 2021, the village's population numbered 246 inhabitants.

== Geography ==
The village is located in the eastern part of Opole Voivodeship. It is situated in the historical Upper Silesia region. It lies in the Silesian Upland. The sołectwo of Kalinów has an area of 921 hectares (2,280 acres).
