= Niwki, Strzelce County =

Niwki
- Village
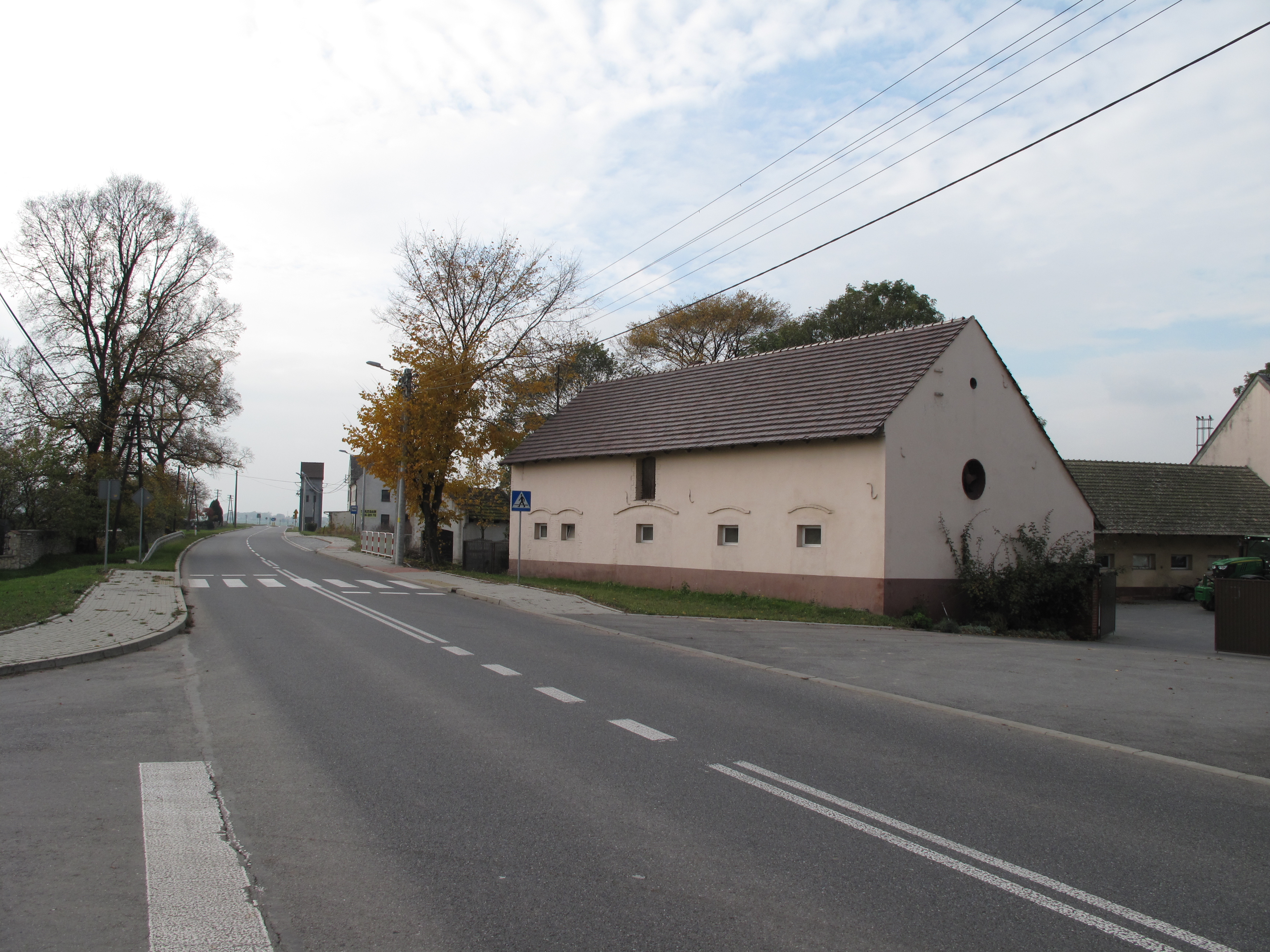
- Main road

- Location within Poland
- Coordinates: 50°29′59″N 18°9′23″E
- Country: Poland
- Voivodeship: Opole
- County: Strzelce
- Gmina: Strzelce Opolskie

Niwki [ˈnifki] (German: Niewke) is a village in the administrative district of Gmina Strzelce Opolskie, within Strzelce County, Opole Voivodeship, in south-western Poland.

== Gallery ==
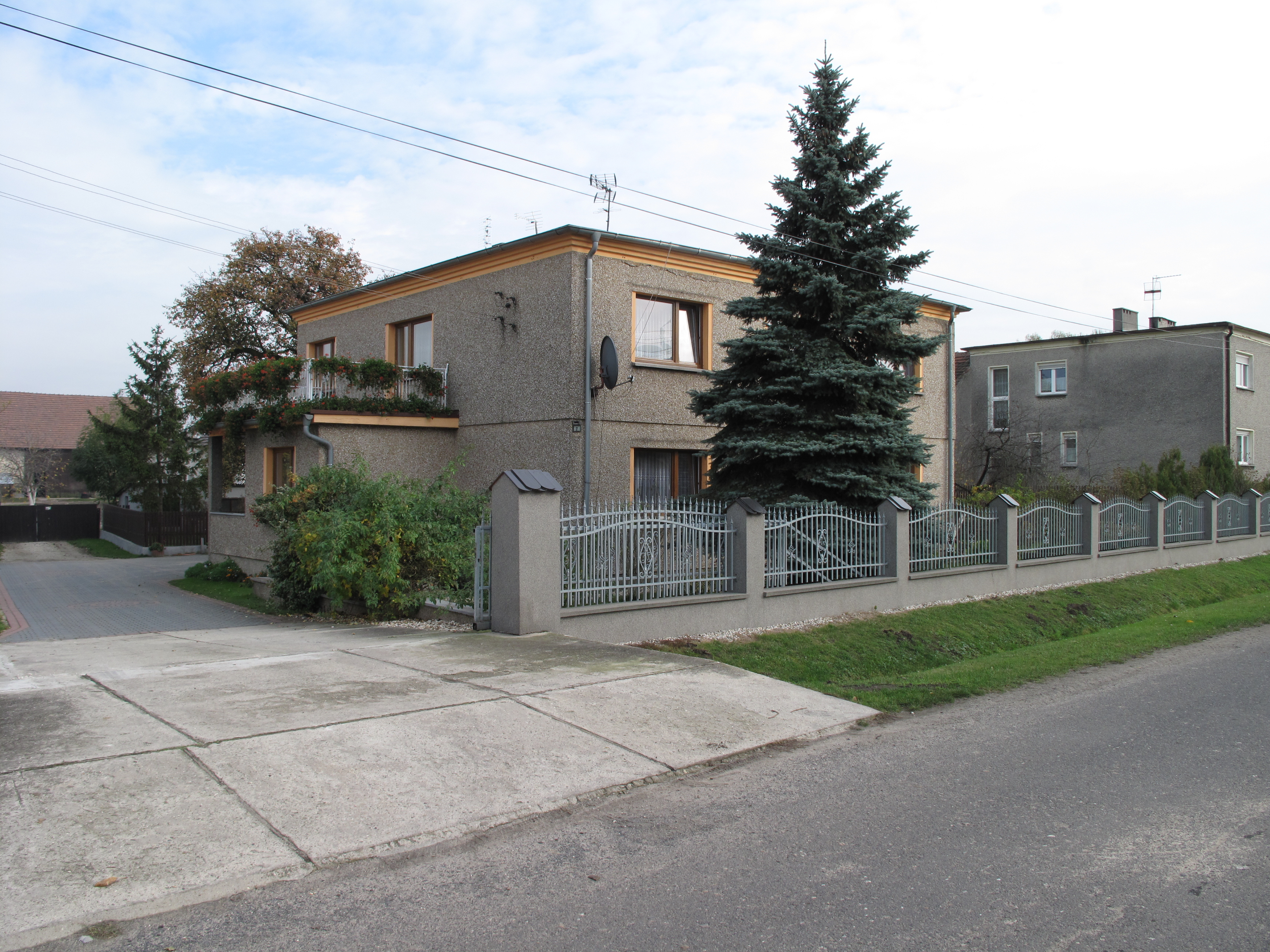
House

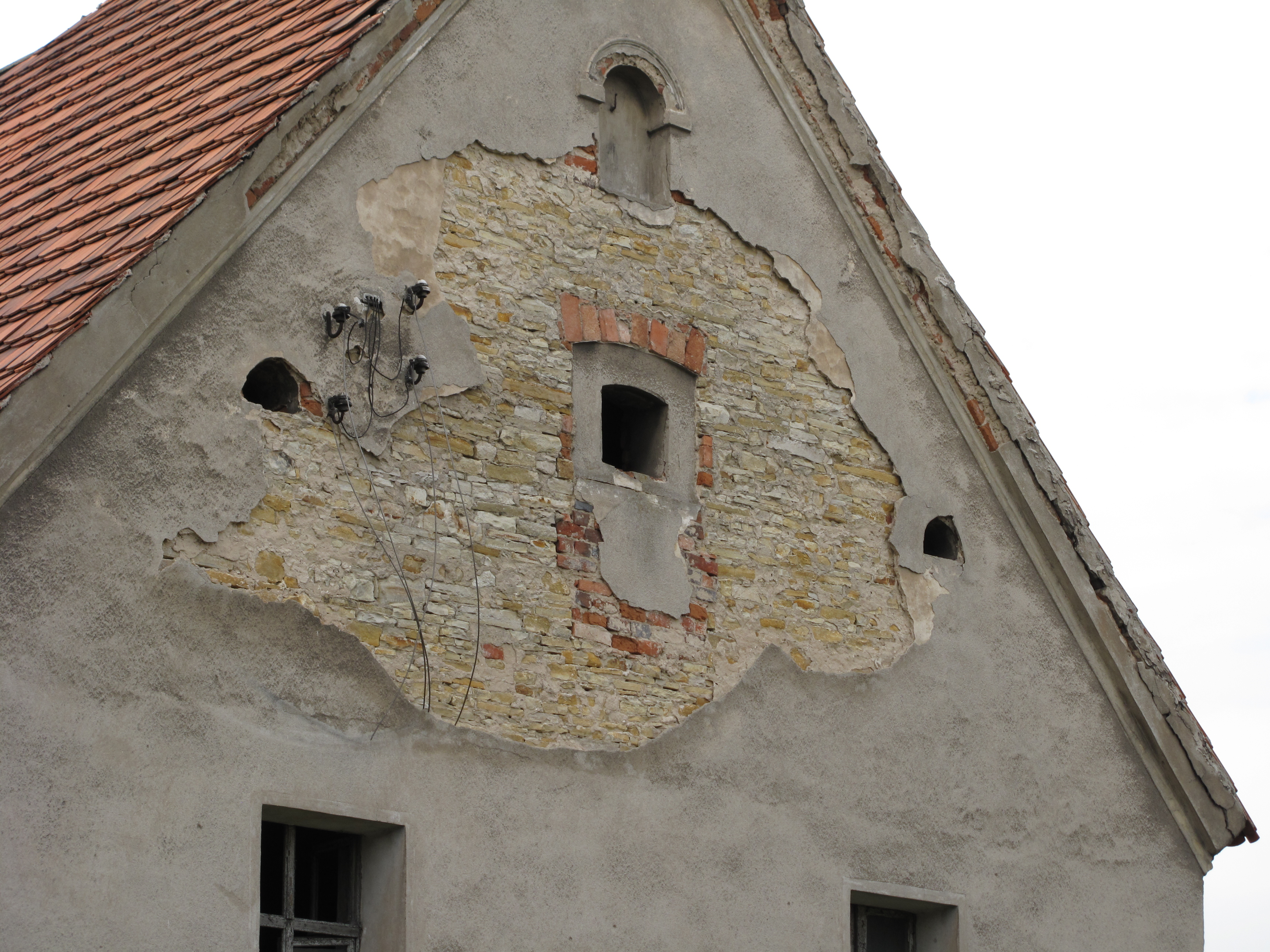
House in detail

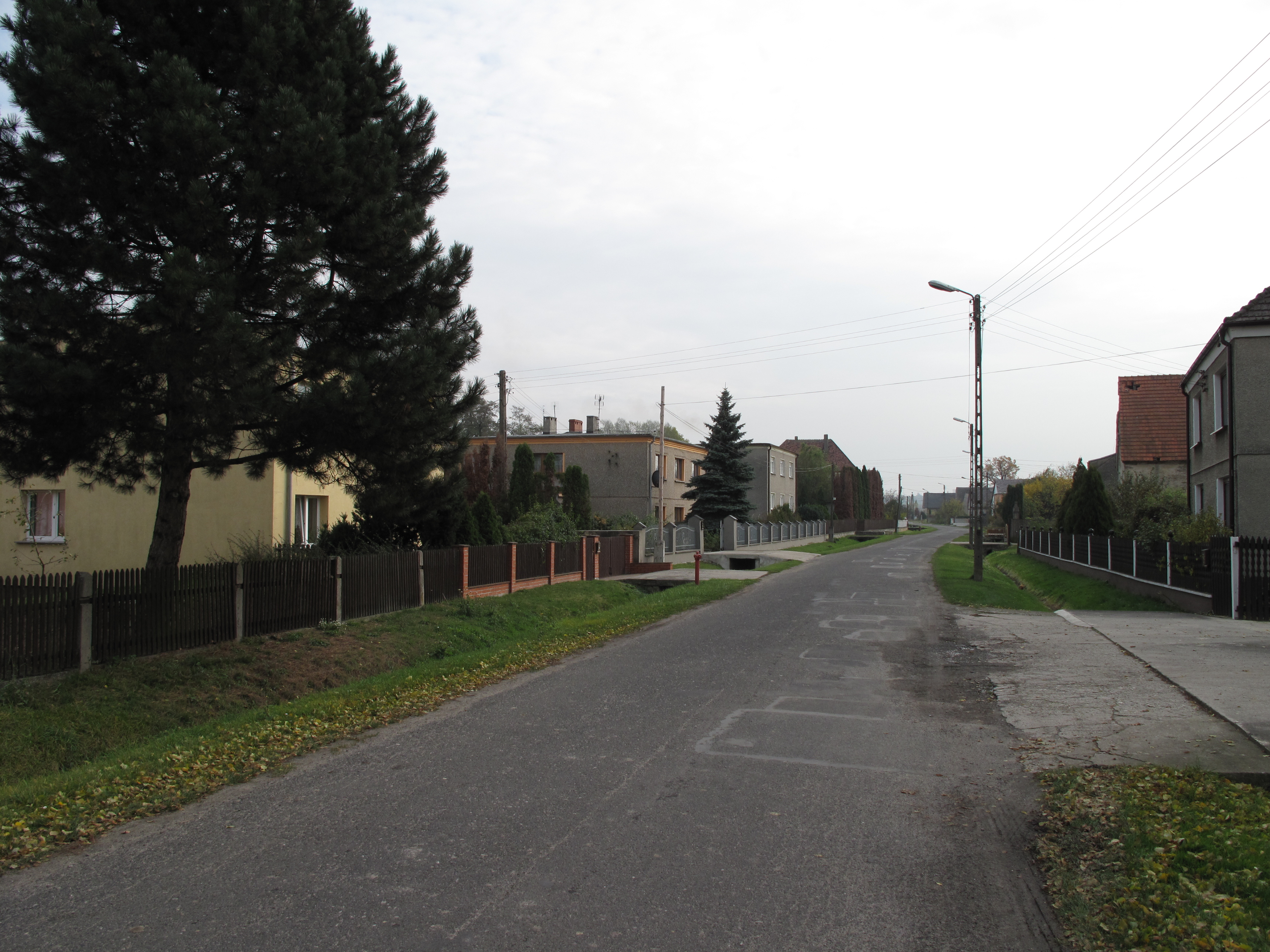
Road
