= Rożniątów =

- Village
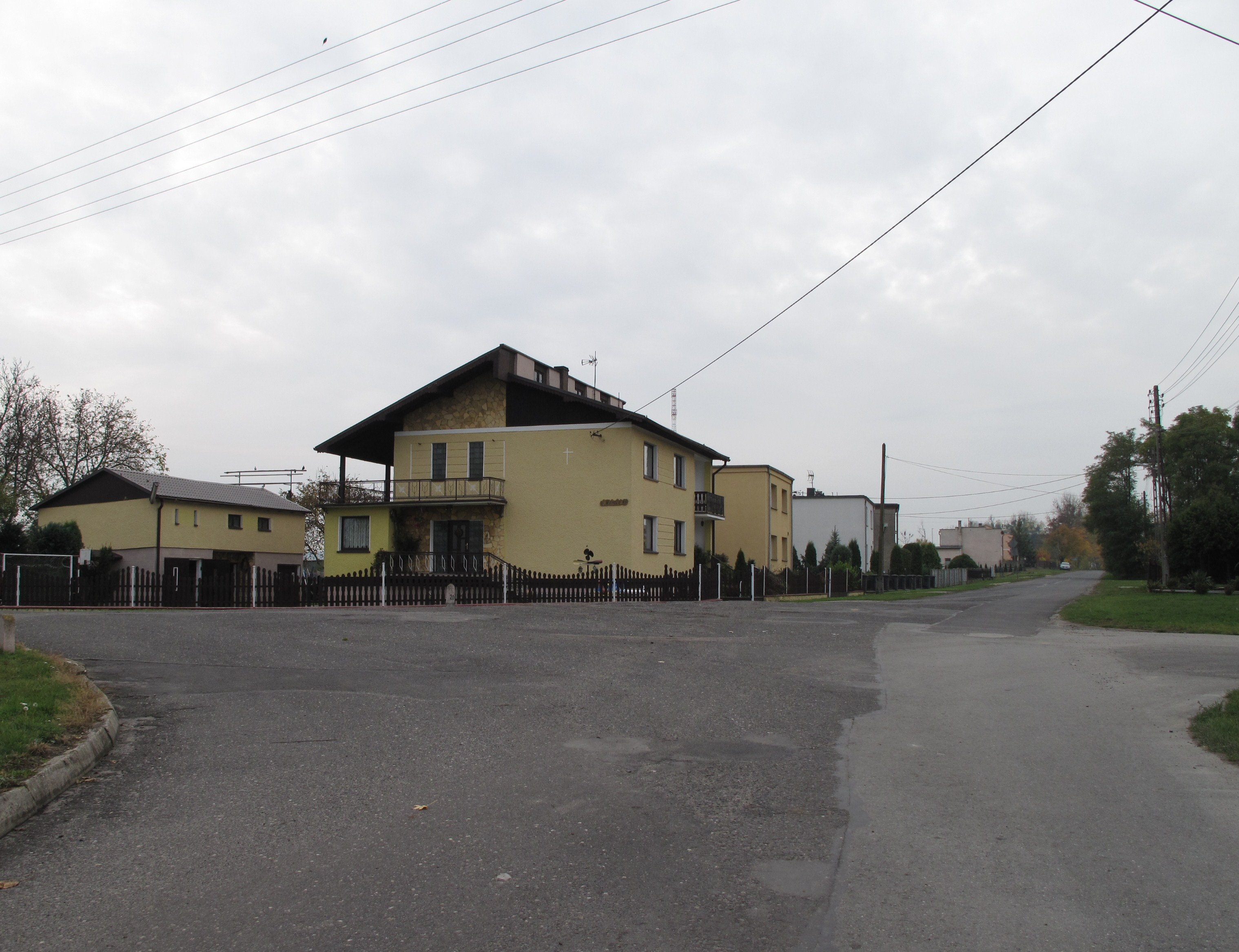
- Houses on crossroads

- Location within Poland
- Coordinates: 50°30′37″N 18°15′03″E
- Country: Poland
- Voivodeship: Opole
- County: Strzelce
- Gmina: Strzelce Opolskie

Rożniątów [rɔʐˈɲɔntuf] (German: Rosniontau) is a village in the administrative district of Gmina Strzelce Opolskie, within Strzelce County, Opole Voivodeship, in south-western Poland.

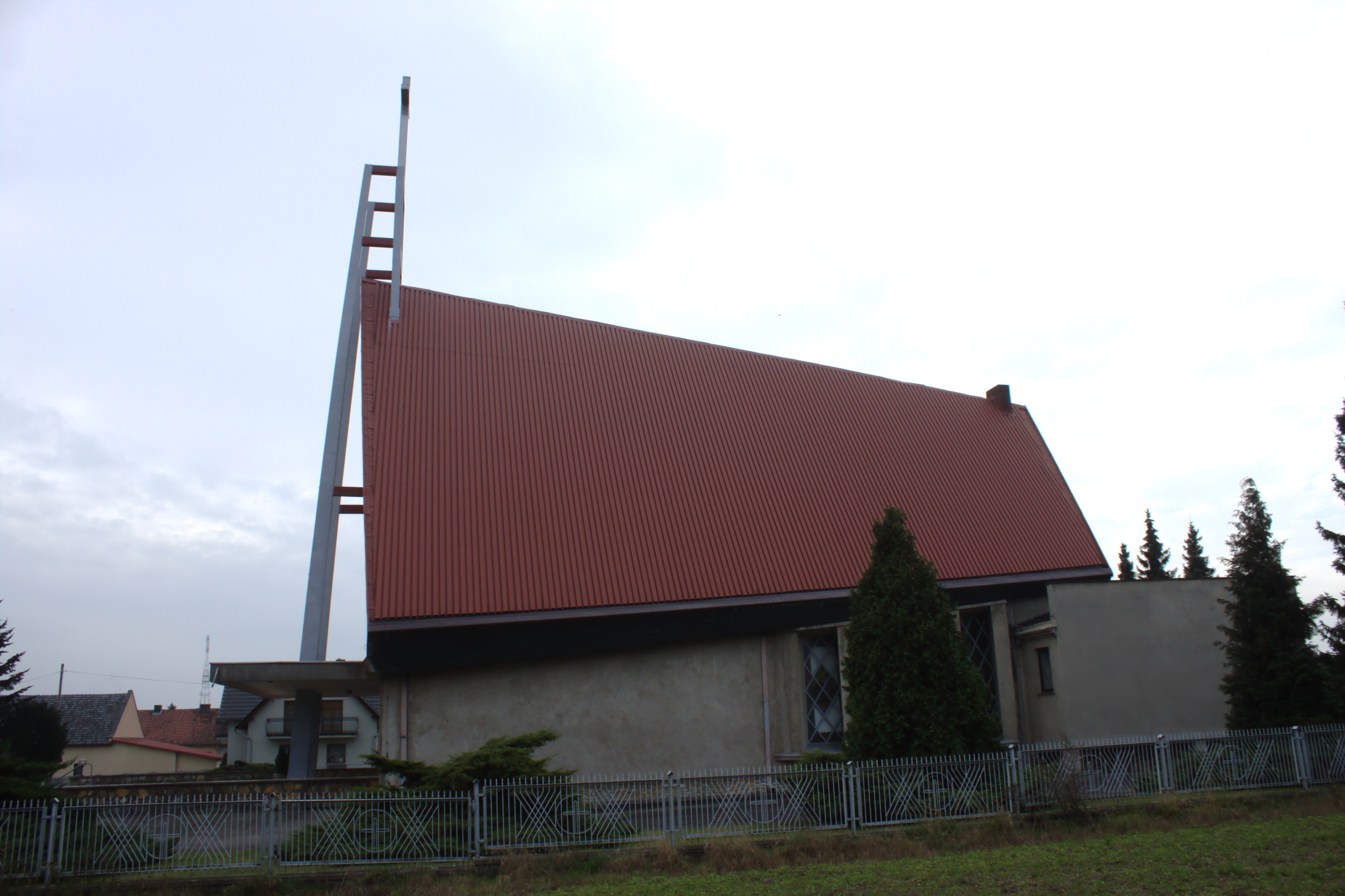
Church

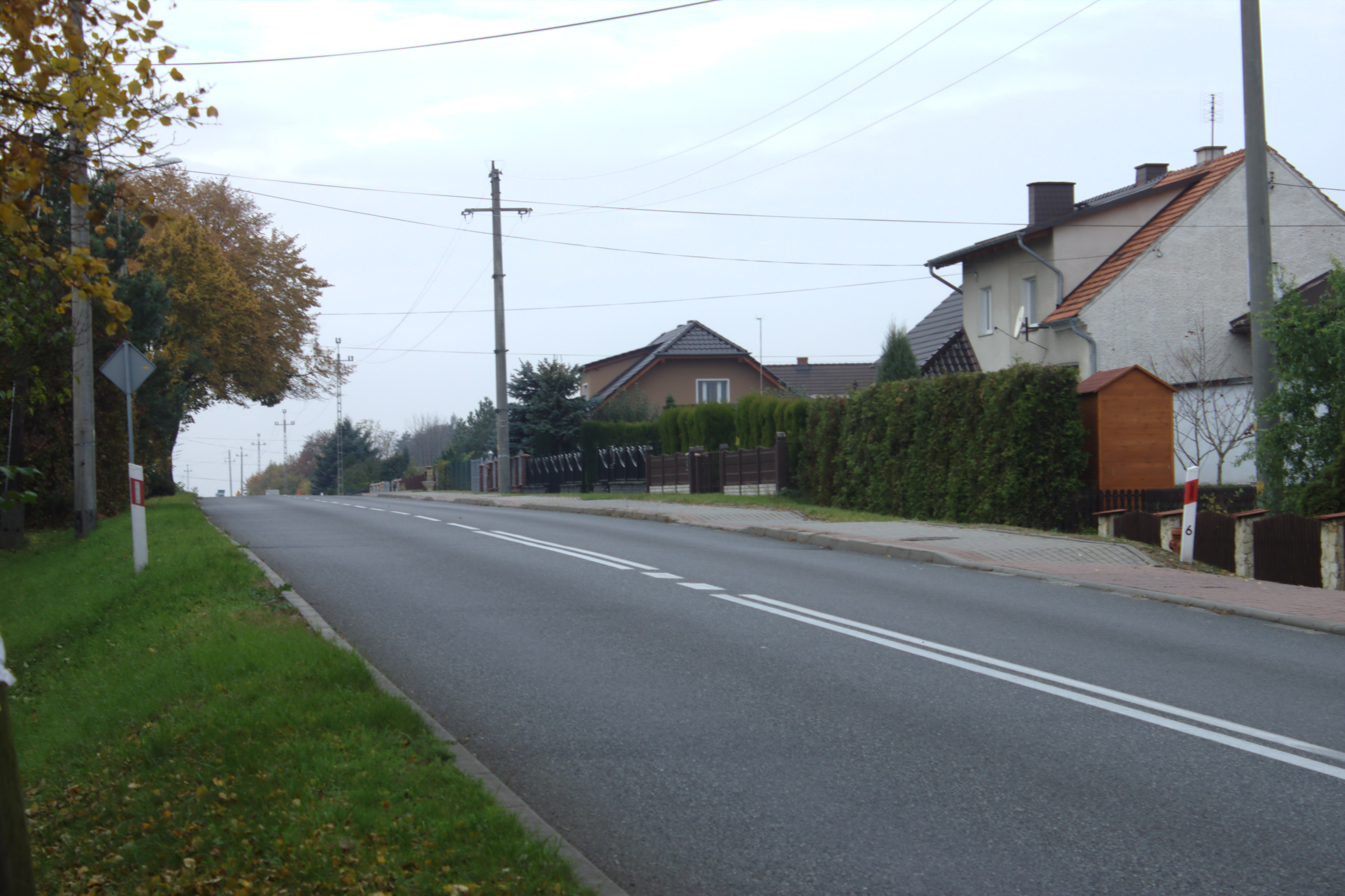

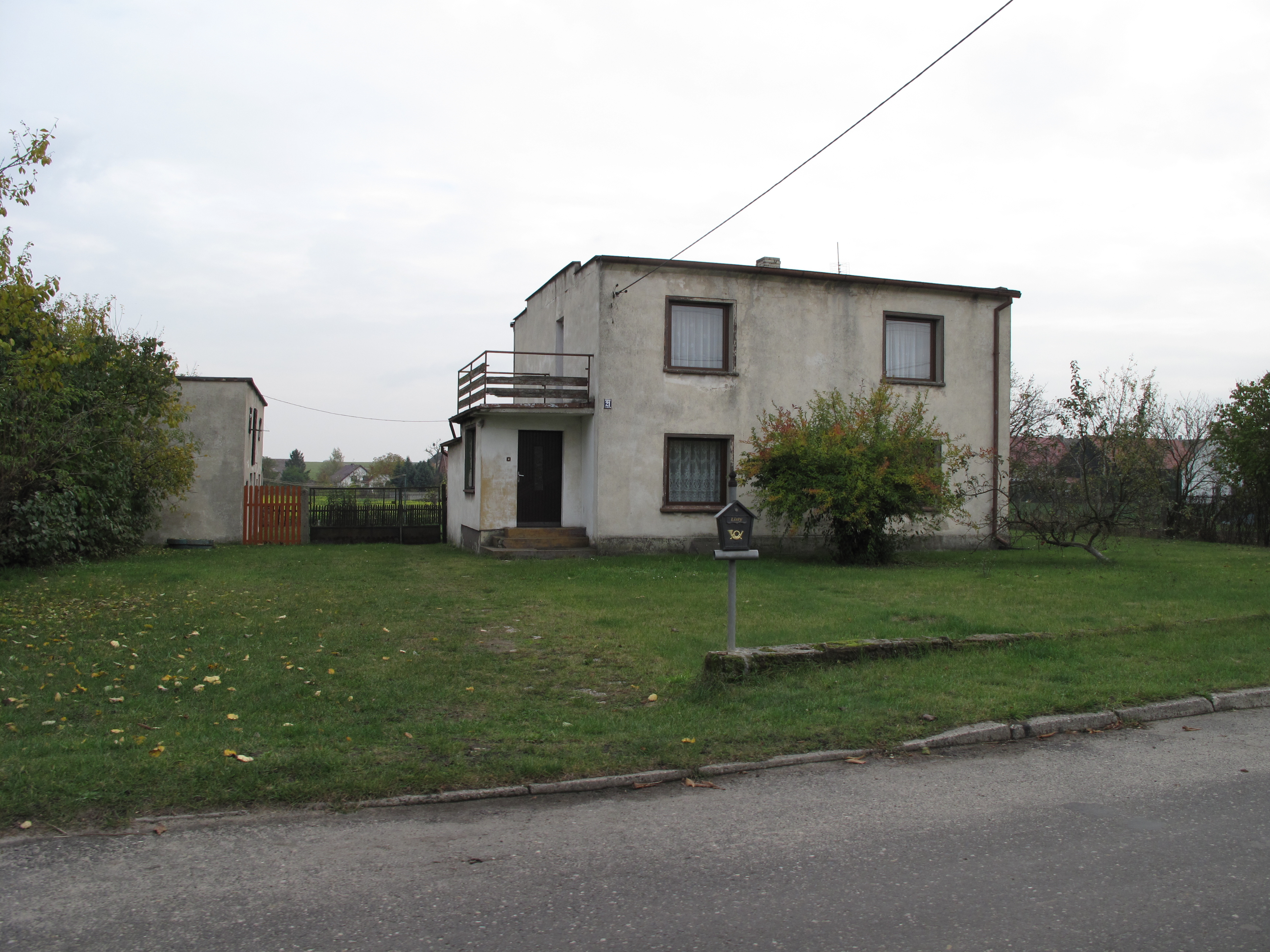
House

== History ==
In the Upper Silesian plebiscite of March 20, 1921, 46 eligible voters voted to remain with Germany and 136 for Poland. On the Rosniontau estate, 27 people voted for Germany and 69 for Poland. Rosniontau remained part of the German Reich. In 1933, the village had 566 inhabitants. On July 3, 1936, the village was renamed Kurzbach. In 1939, the village had 744 inhabitants. Until 1945, the village was part of the Groß Strehlitz district.

A subcamp of the Gross-Rosen concentration camp was established in Kurzbach on October 22, 1944. A maximum of 1,000 prisoners were forced to work there for the Organisation Todt. The subcamp was dissolved on January 20, 1945. Among the surviving prisoners were Hana Bořkovcová with her mother, and Werner Sander.

In 1945, the formerly German town came under Polish administration, was renamed Rożniątów, and incorporated into the Silesian Voivodeship. In 1950, it became part of the Opole Voivodeship, and in 1999, it was incorporated into the newly re-established Strzelce County.
