= Kaczorownia =

- Village
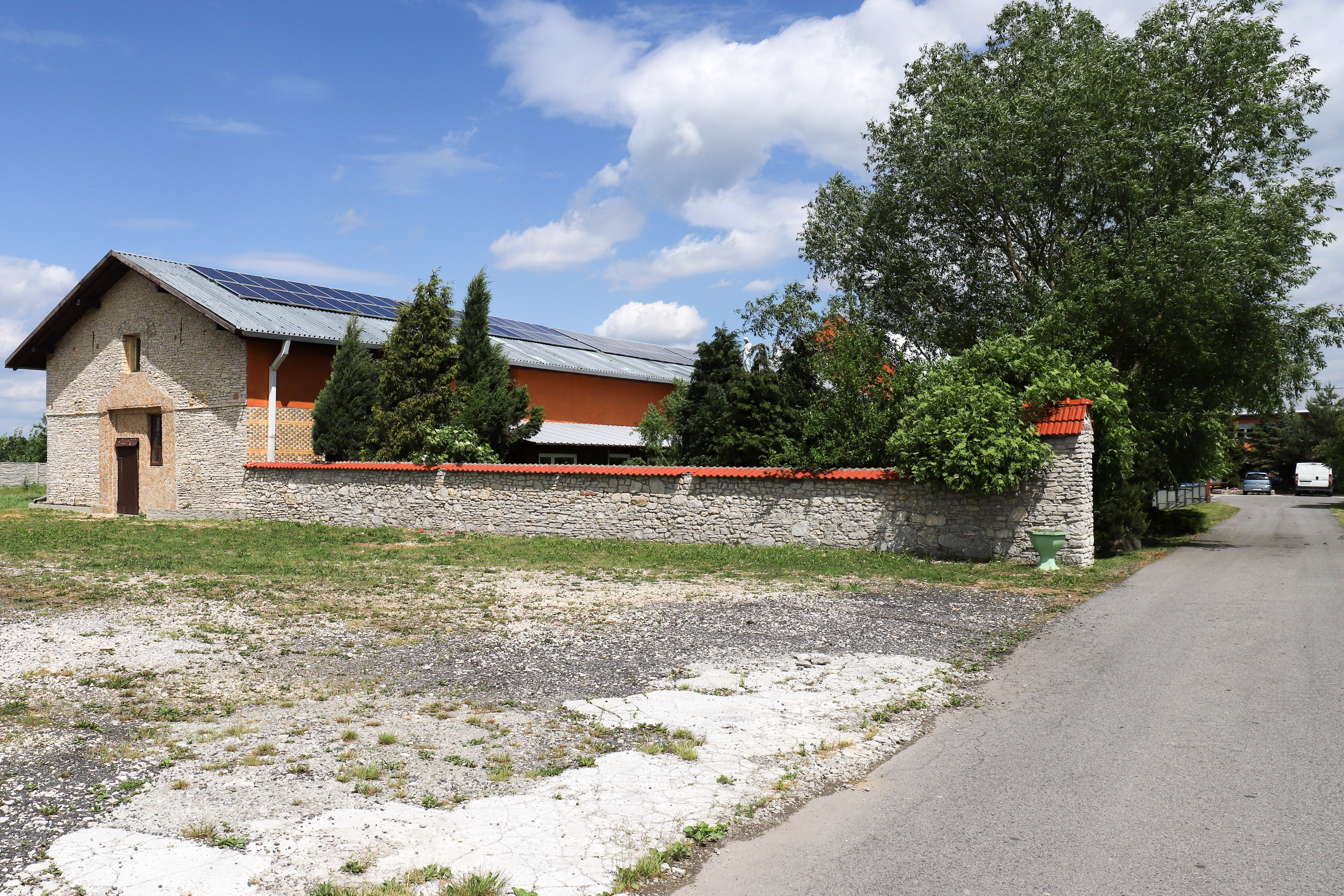

- Location within Poland
- Coordinates: 50°28′43″N 18°20′23″E
- Country: Poland
- Voivodeship: Opole
- County: Strzelce
- Gmina: Strzelce Opolskie
- Time zone: UTC+1 (CET)
  - Summer (DST): UTC+2
- Postal code: 47-134
- Area code: +4877
- Vehicle registration: OST

Kaczorownia (German: Kotschorownia) is a village in the administrative district of Gmina Strzelce Opolskie, within Strzelce County, Opole Voivodeship, south-western Poland.

There is a homeless shelter in Kaczorownia, owned by the Barka foundation.
