= Nowa Wieś, Strzelce County =

Nowa Wieś
- Neighbourhood of Strzelce Opolskie
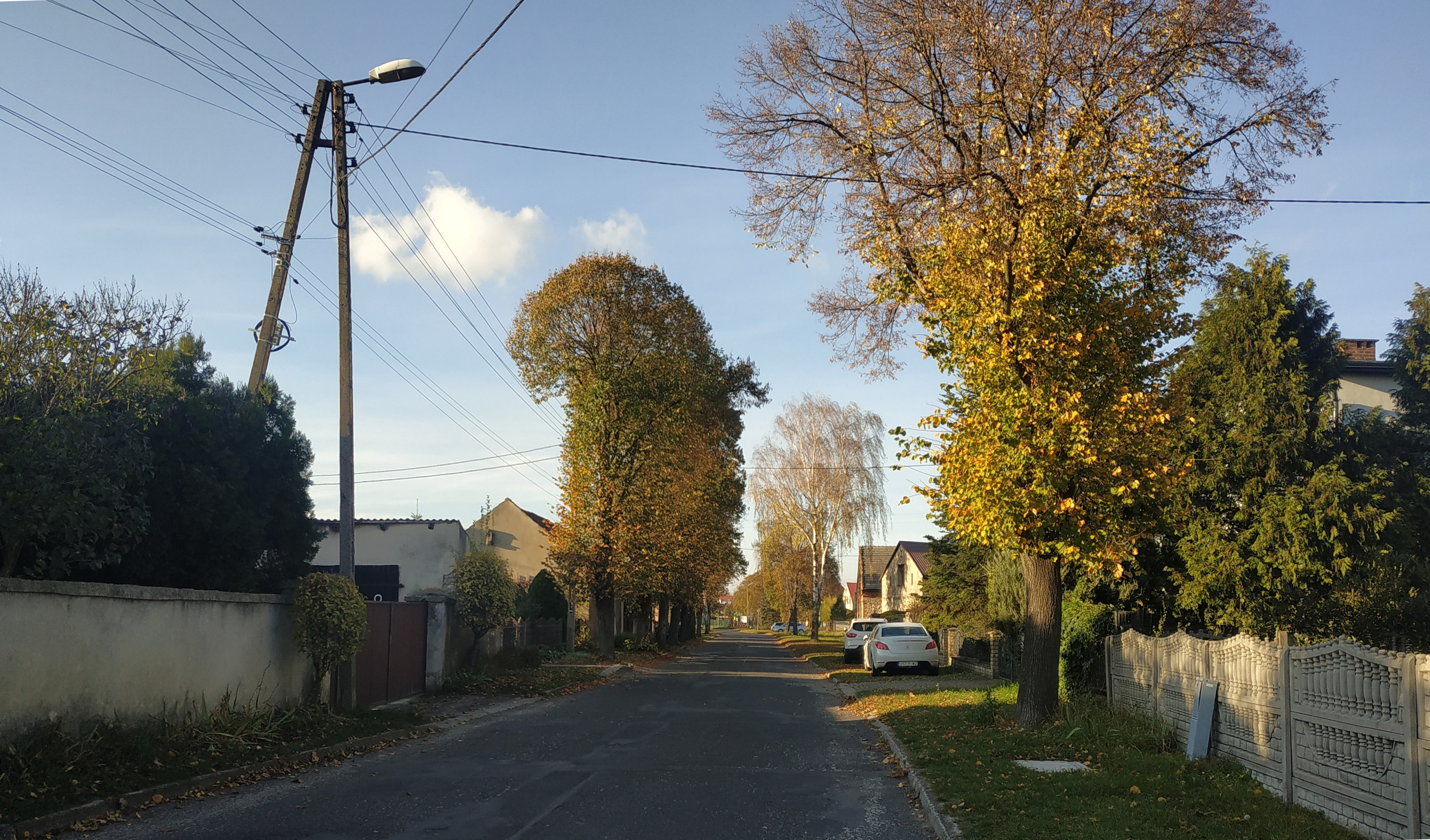

- Location within Poland
- Coordinates: 50°31′24″N 18°17′13″E
- Country: Poland
- Voivodeship: Opole
- County: Strzelce
- Gmina: Strzelce Opolskie
- Town: Strzelce Opolskie

Population
  - Total: 840
- Time zone: UTC+1 (CET)
  - Summer (DST): UTC+2 (CEST)
- Vehicle registration: OST

Nowa Wieś [ˈnɔva ˈvjɛɕ] is a neighbourhood of the town of Strzelce Opolskie, in southern Poland.
