= Szymiszów-Osiedle =

- Village
- Location within Poland
- Coordinates: 50°32′09″N 18°13′18″E
- Country: Poland
- Voivodeship: Opole
- County: Strzelce
- Gmina: Strzelce Opolskie
- Time zone: UTC+1 (CET)
  - Summer (DST): UTC+2
- Postal code: 47-100
- Area code: +4877
- Vehicle registration: OST

Szymiszów-Osiedle (German: Schimischow-Siedlung) is a village in the administrative district of Gmina Strzelce Opolskie, within Strzelce County, Opole Voivodeship, south-western Poland.
