= Suche Łany =

- Neighbourhood of Strzelce Opolskie
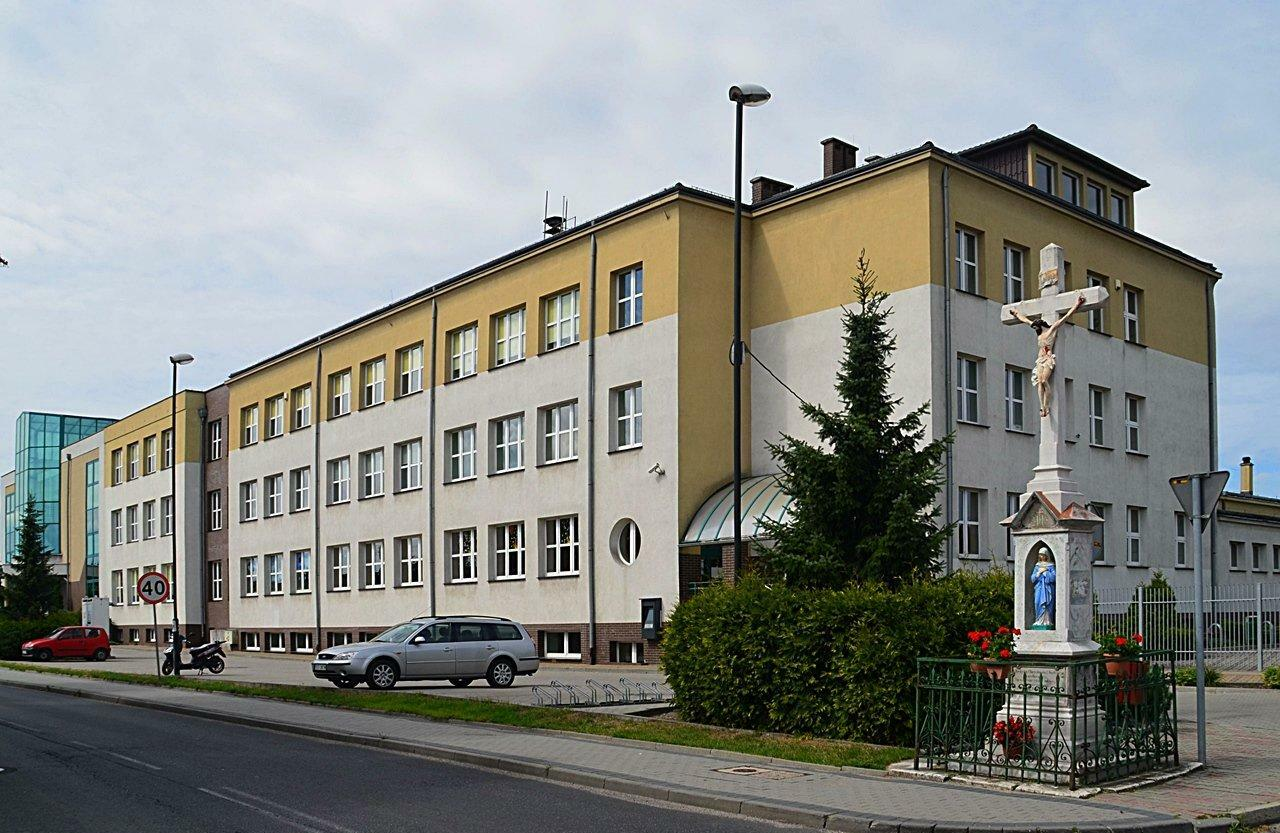
- School in Suche Łany

- Location within Poland
- Coordinates: 50°33′10″N 18°13′20″E
- Country: Poland
- Voivodeship: Opole
- County: Strzelce
- Gmina: Strzelce Opolskie
- Town: Strzelce Opolskie

Population
  - Total: 564
- Time zone: UTC+1 (CET)
  - Summer (DST): UTC+2 (CEST)
- Vehicle registration: OST

Suche Łany [ˈsuxɛ ˈwanɨ] is a neighbourhood of the town of Strzelce Opolskie, in southern Poland.
