= Kalinowice, Opole Voivodeship =

Kalinowice
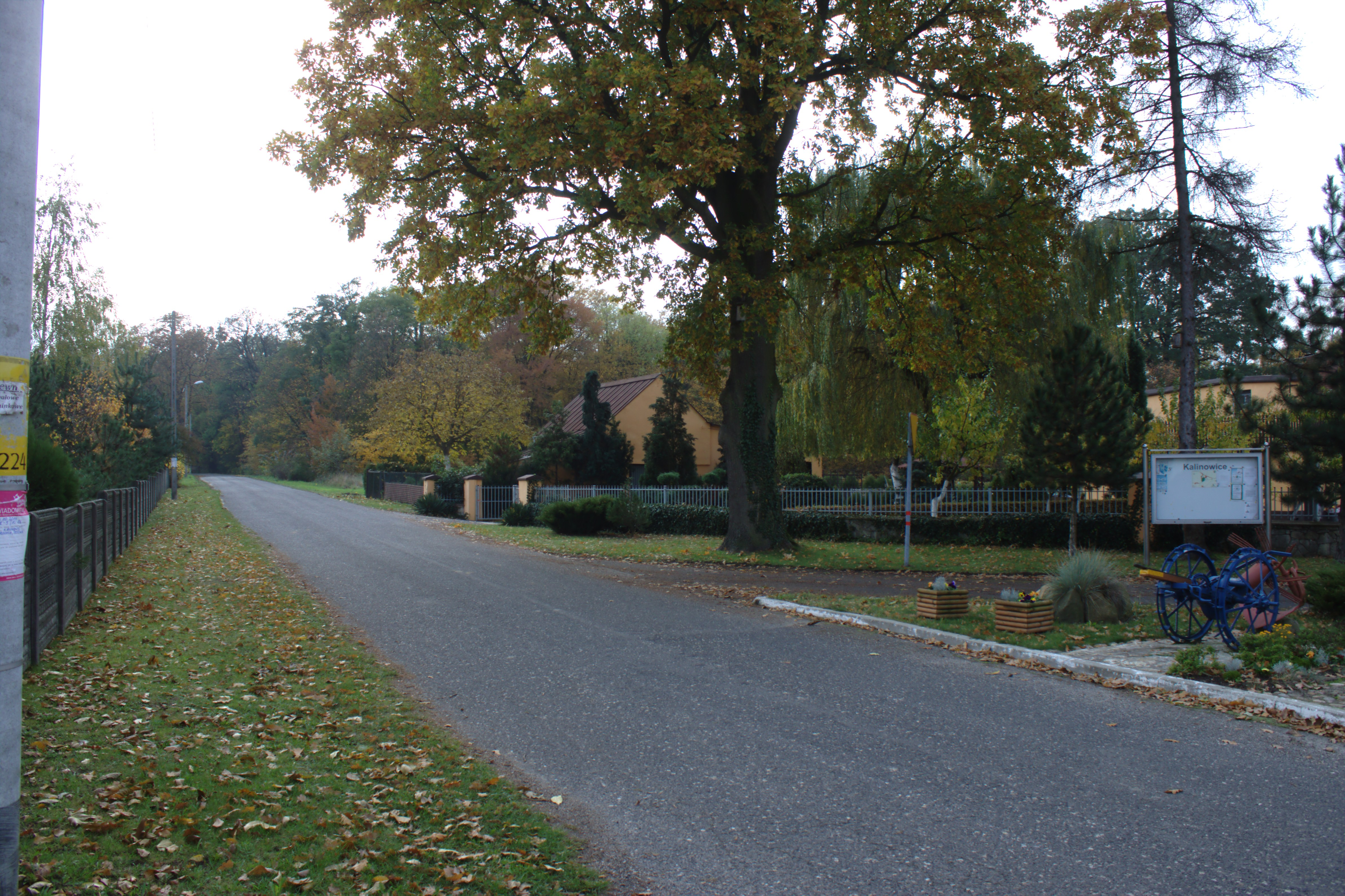
- Village square

- Location within Poland
- Coordinates: 50°30′28″N 18°10′54″E
- Country: Poland
- Voivodeship: Opole
- County: Strzelce
- Gmina: Strzelce Opolskie

Kalinowice [kalinɔˈvit͡sɛ] (German: Kalinowitz) is a village in the administrative district of Gmina Strzelce Opolskie, within Strzelce County, Opole Voivodeship, in south-western Poland.

== Gallery ==
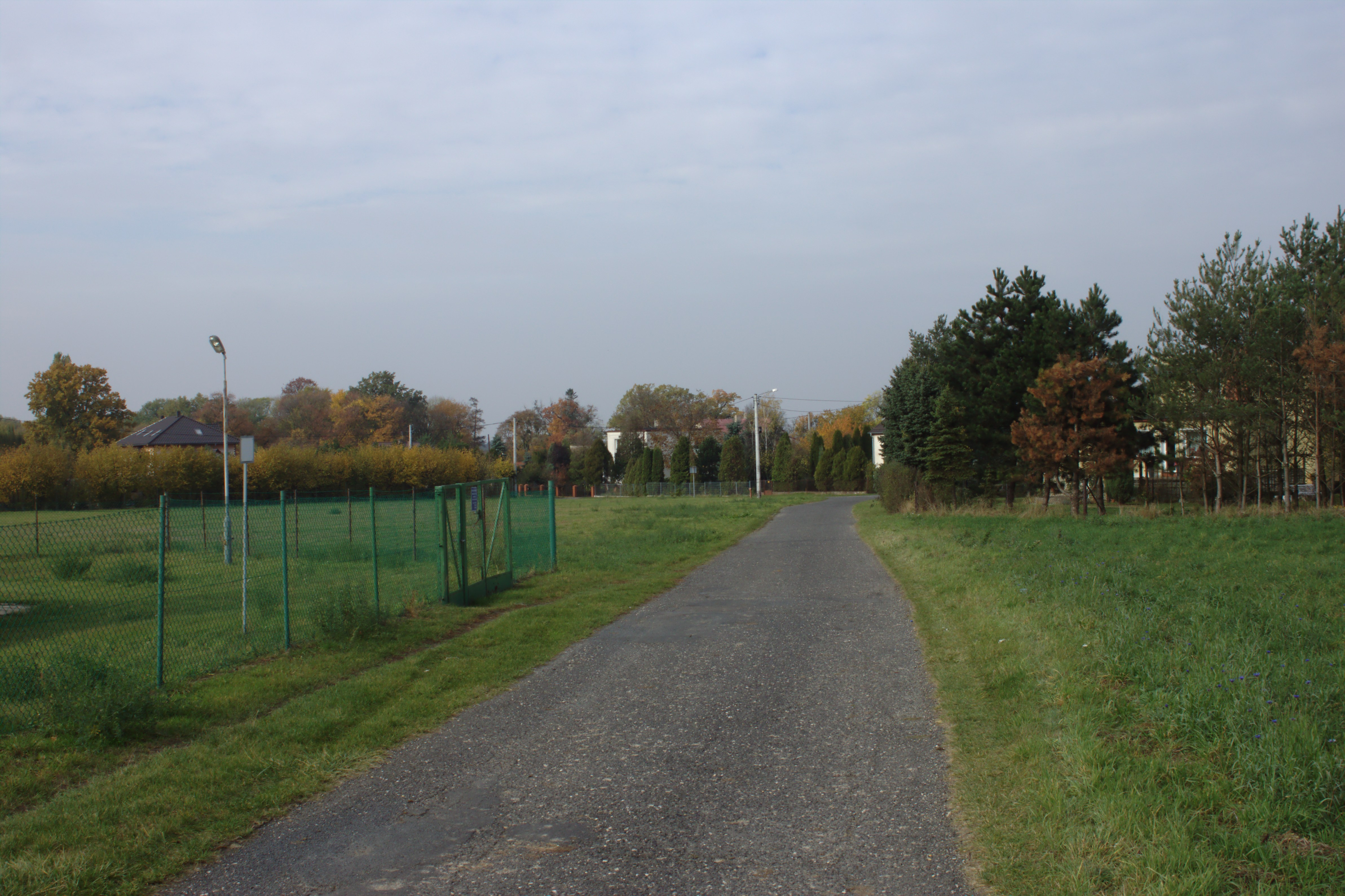
Road

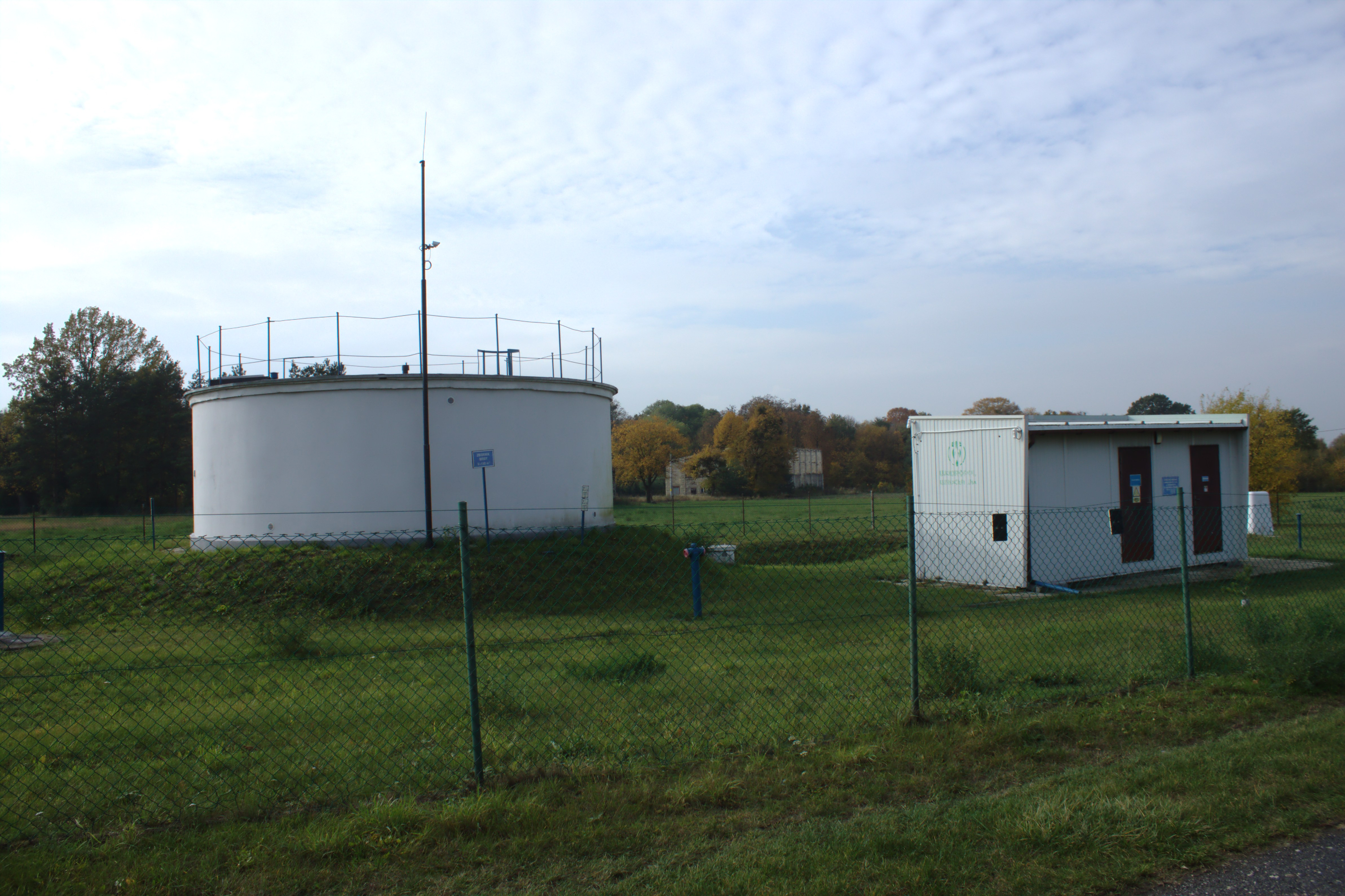
Waste water treatment facility
