= Warmątowice =

- Village
- Location within Poland
- Coordinates: 50°29′38″N 18°22′33″E
- Country: Poland
- Voivodeship: Opole
- County: Strzelce
- Gmina: Strzelce Opolskie
- Population: 653

Warmątowice [varmɔntɔˈvit͡sɛ] (German: Warmuntowitz) is a village in the administrative district of Gmina Strzelce Opolskie, within Strzelce County, Opole Voivodeship, in south-western Poland.
