= Brzezina, Strzelce County =

Brzezina
- Village
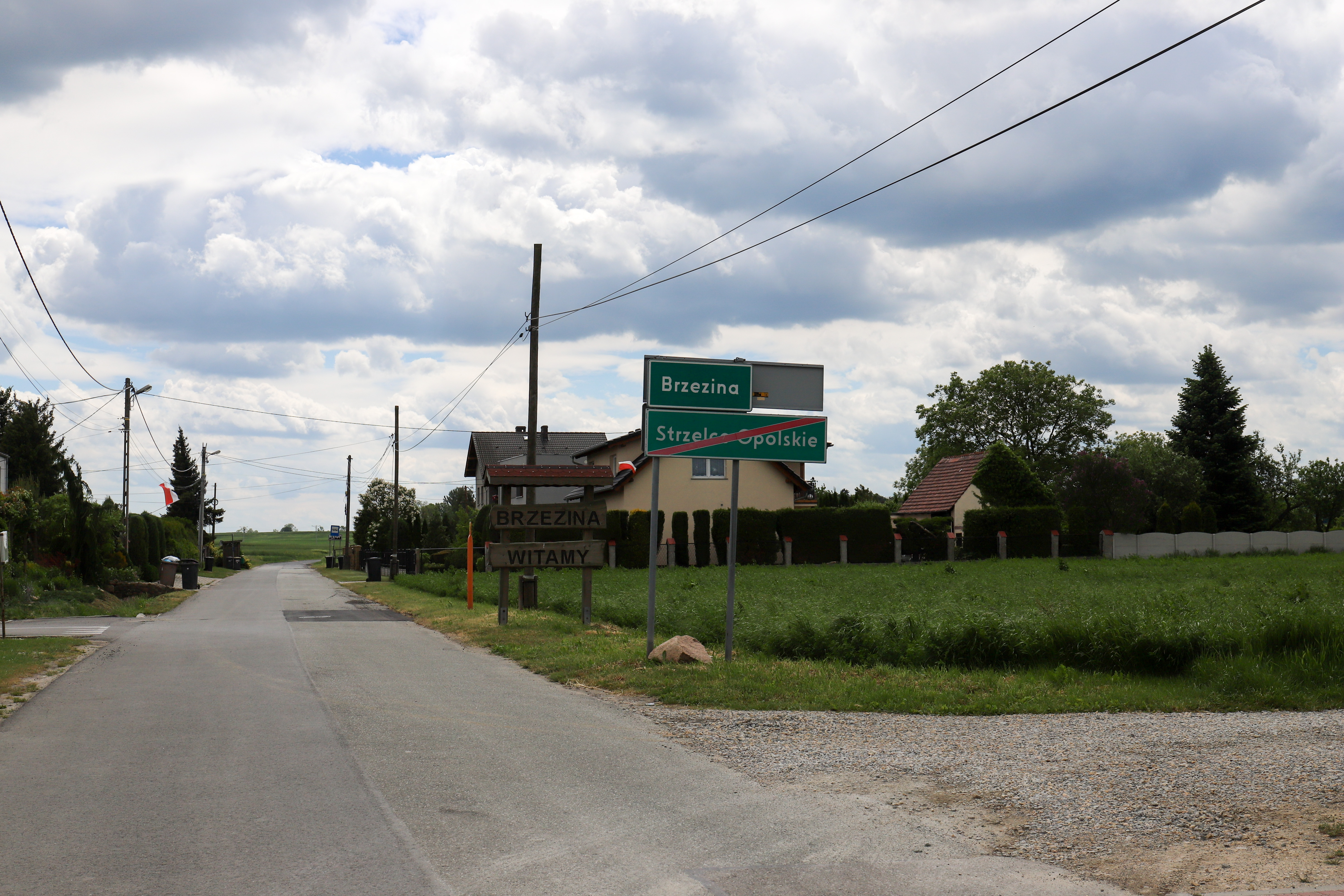

- Location within Poland
- Coordinates: 50°28′43″N 18°19′5″E
- Country: Poland
- Voivodeship: Opole
- County: Strzelce
- Gmina: Strzelce Opolskie

Brzezina [bʐɛˈʑina] (German: Bresina) is a village in the administrative district of Gmina Strzelce Opolskie, within Strzelce County, Opole Voivodeship, in south-western Poland.
