= Jędrynie =

- Village
- Location within Poland
- Coordinates: 50°34′N 18°17′E
- Country: Poland
- Voivodeship: Opole
- County: Strzelce
- Gmina: Strzelce Opolskie

Jędrynie [jɛnˈdrɨɲɛ] (German: Jendrin) is a village in the administrative district of Gmina Strzelce Opolskie, within Strzelce County, Opole Voivodeship, in south-western Poland.
