= Szczepanek, Opole Voivodeship =

Szczepanek
- Village
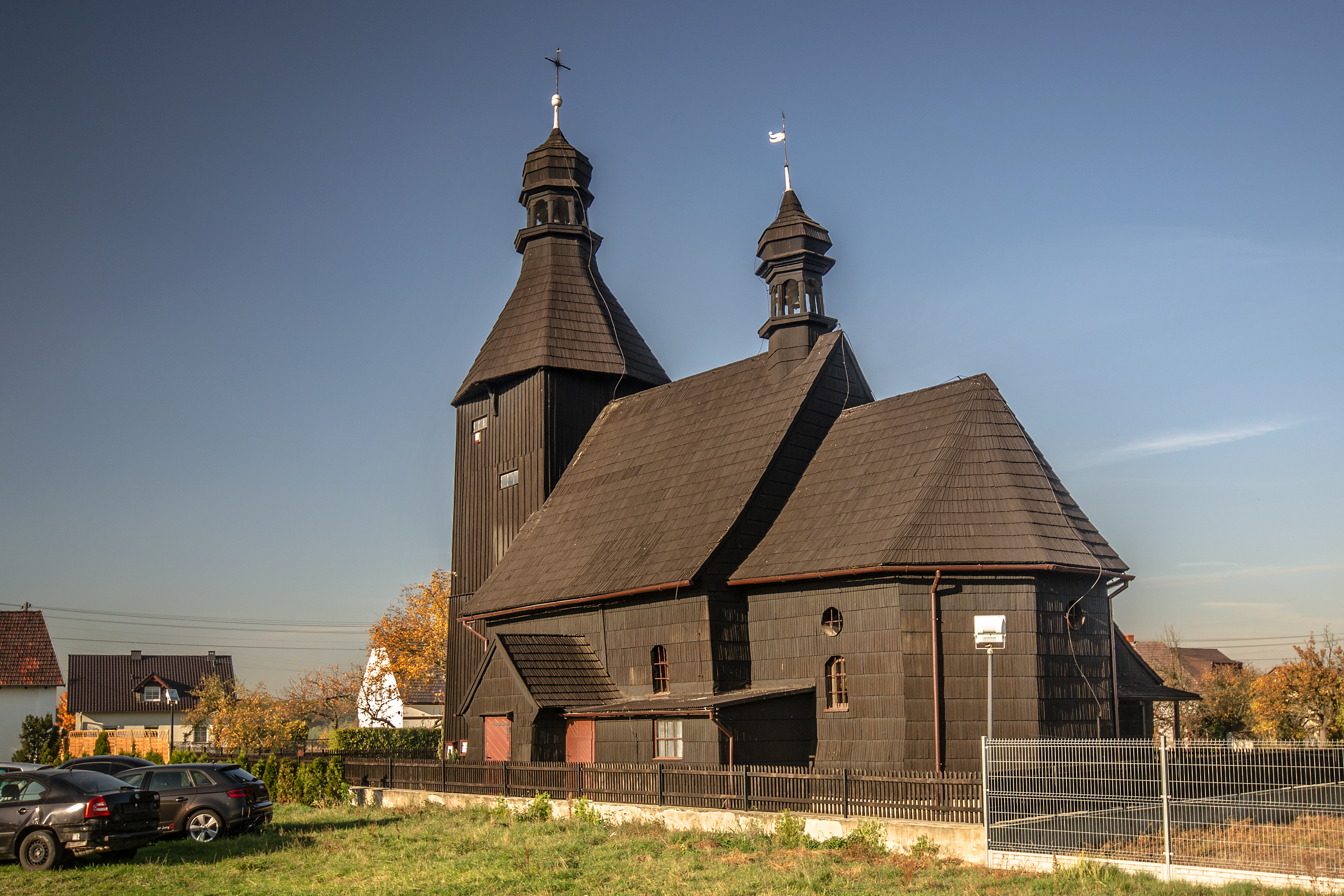
- Catholic church

- Location within Poland
- Coordinates: 50°32′03″N 18°20′20″E
- Country: Poland
- Voivodeship: Opole
- County: Strzelce
- Gmina: Strzelce Opolskie
- Population: 720

Szczepanek [ʂt͡ʂɛˈpanɛk] (German: Stephanshain) is a village in the administrative district of Gmina Strzelce Opolskie, within Strzelce County, Opole Voivodeship, in south-western Poland.
