= Osiek, Opole Voivodeship =

Osiek
- Village
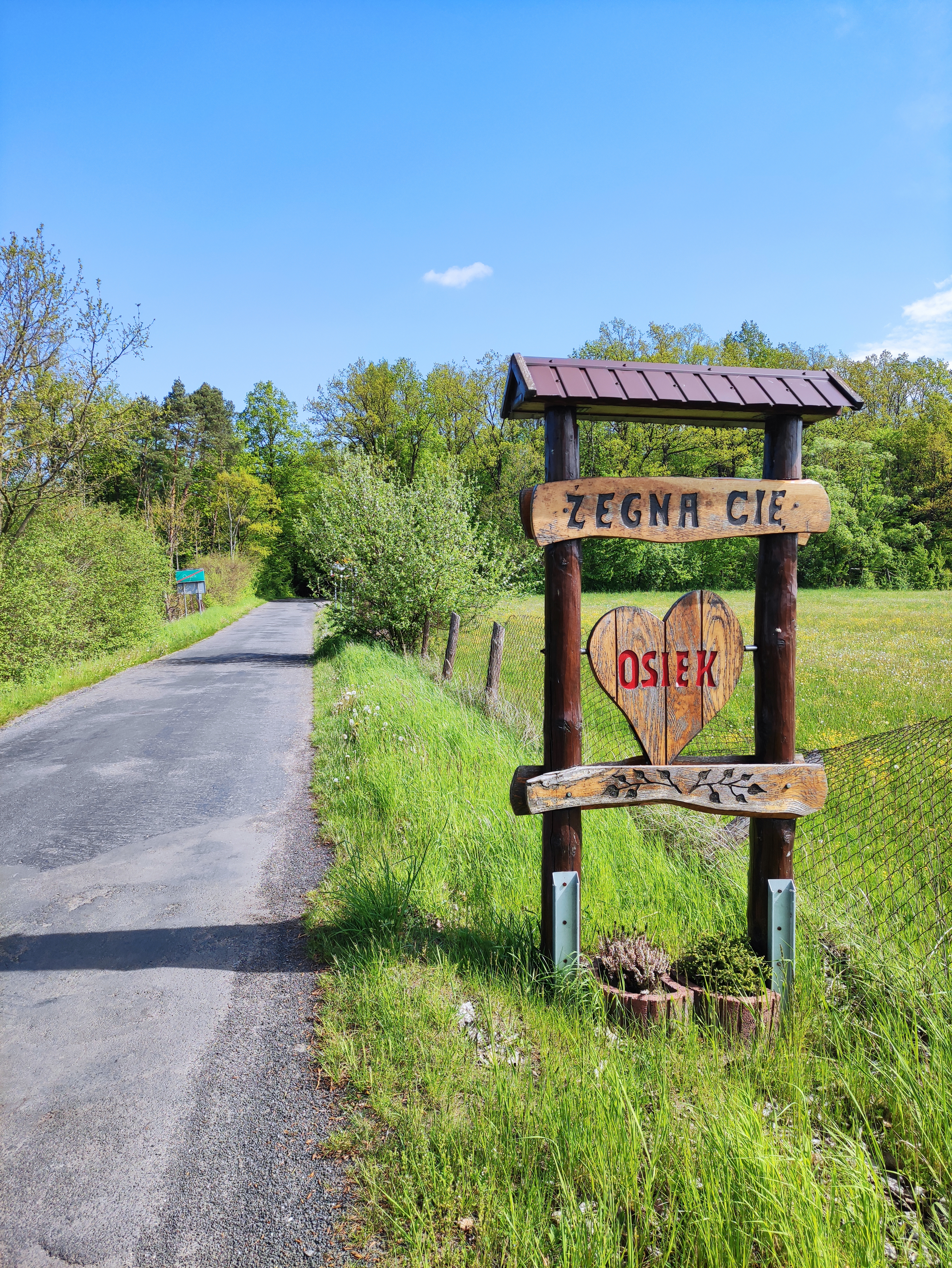

- Location within Poland
- Coordinates: 50°35′N 18°18′E
- Country: Poland
- Voivodeship: Opole
- County: Strzelce
- Gmina: Strzelce Opolskie

Osiek [ˈɔɕɛk] (German: Oschiek) is a village in the administrative district of Gmina Strzelce Opolskie, within Strzelce County, Opole Voivodeship, in south-western Poland.
