= Sucha, Opole Voivodeship =

Sucha
- Village
- Location within Poland
- Coordinates: 50°33′N 18°13′E
- Country: Poland
- Voivodeship: Opole
- County: Strzelce
- Gmina: Strzelce Opolskie
- Population (approx.): 685

Sucha [ˈsuxa] (German: Suchau) is a village in the administrative district of Gmina Strzelce Opolskie, within Strzelce County, Opole Voivodeship, in south-western Poland.
