= Ligota Dolna, Strzelce County =

Ligota Dolna
- Village
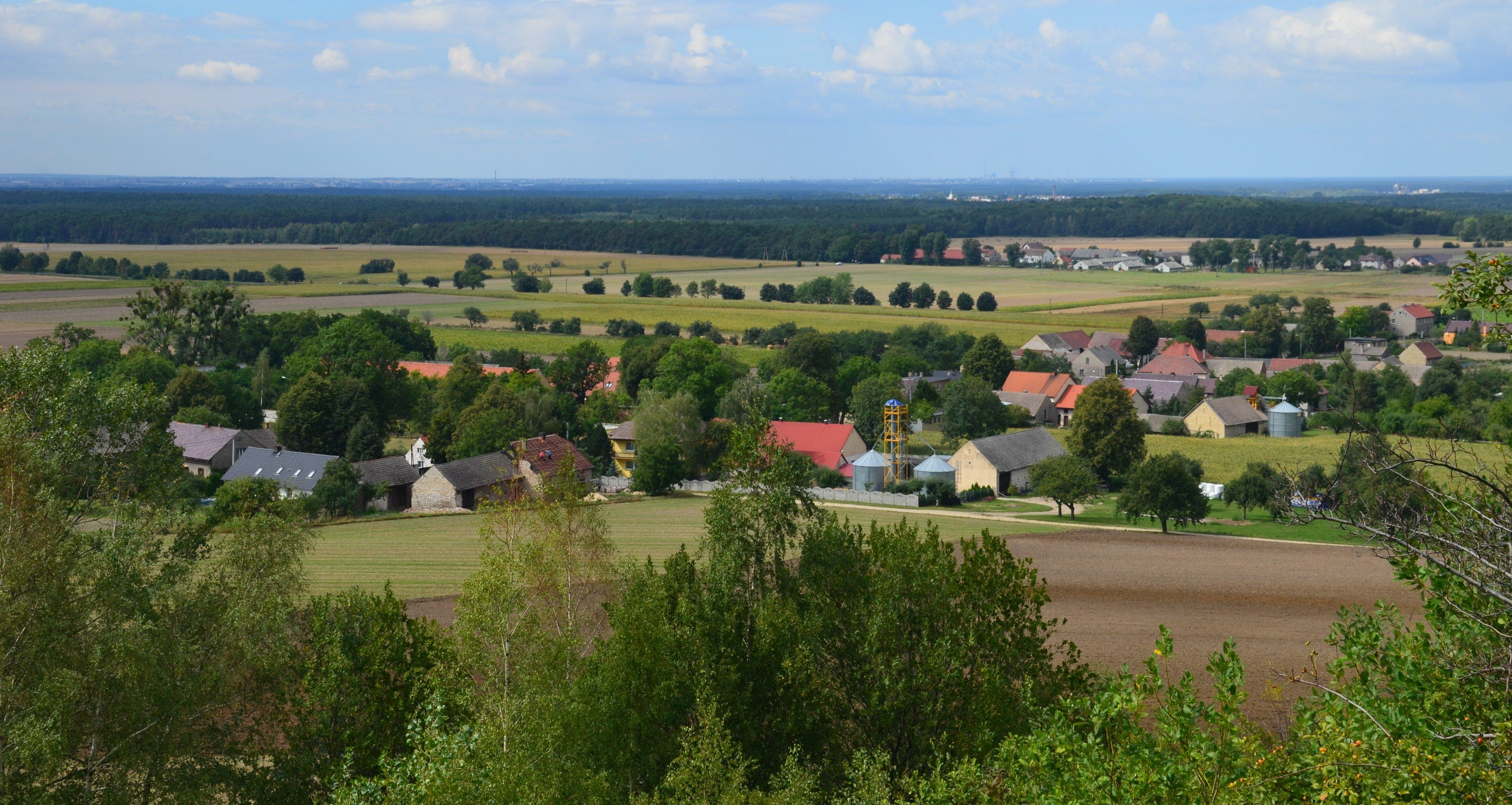

- Location within Poland
- Coordinates: 50°29′N 18°7′E
- Country: Poland
- Voivodeship: Opole
- County: Strzelce
- Gmina: Strzelce Opolskie

Ligota Dolna [liˈɡɔta ˈdɔlna] (German: Nieder Ellguth) is a village in the administrative district of Gmina Strzelce Opolskie, within Strzelce County, Opole Voivodeship, in south-western Poland.
