= Ligota Górna, Strzelce County =

Ligota Górna
- Village
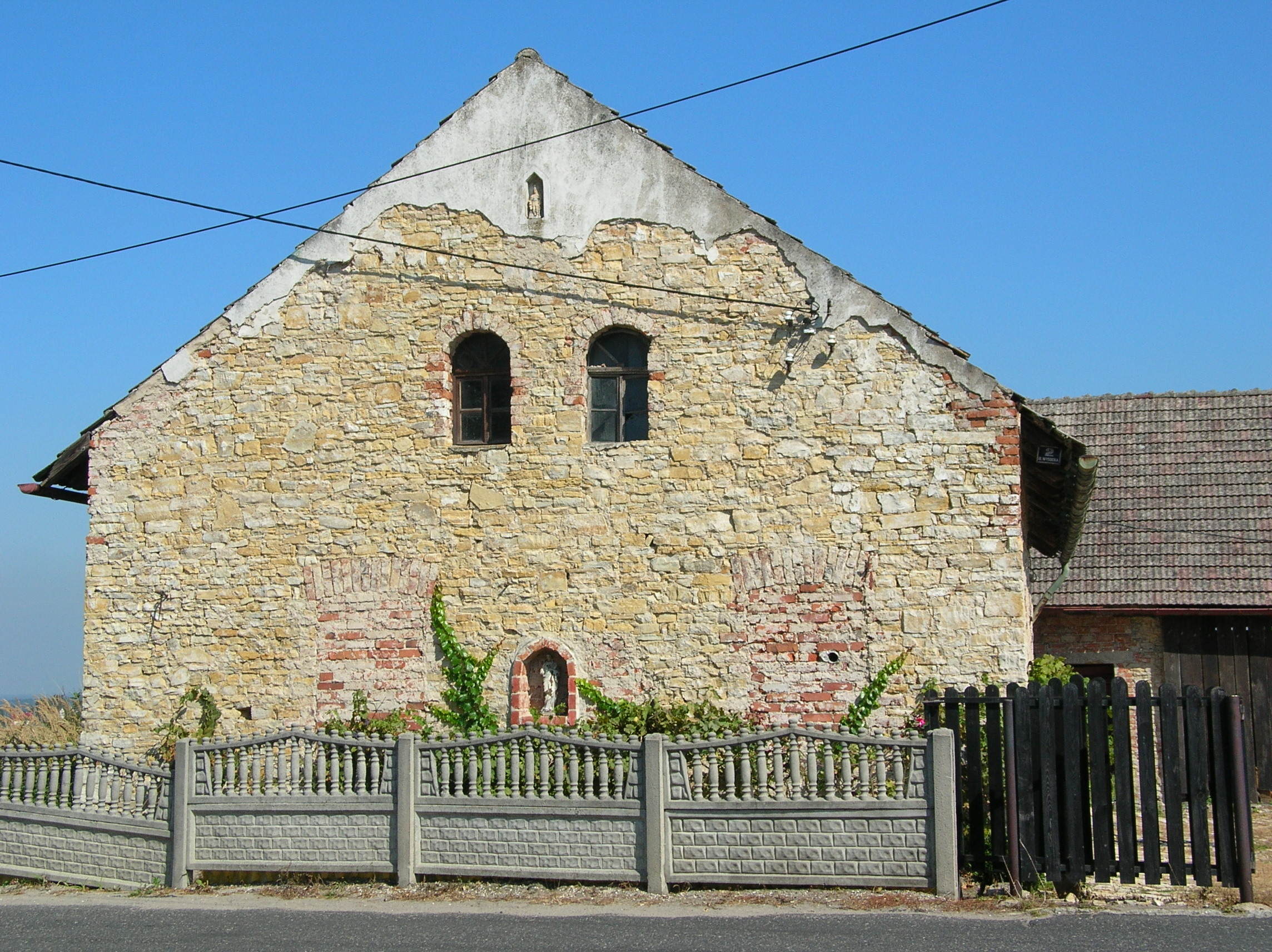
- Cottage built from the limestone blocks at Ligota Górna.

- Location within Poland
- Coordinates: 50°29′N 18°9′E
- Country: Poland
- Voivodeship: Opole
- County: Strzelce
- Gmina: Strzelce Opolskie
- Population: 120

Ligota Górna [liˈɡɔta ˈɡurna] (German: Ober Ellguth) is a village in the administrative district of Gmina Strzelce Opolskie, within Strzelce County, Opole Voivodeship, in south-western Poland.
