= Dziewkowice =

- Village
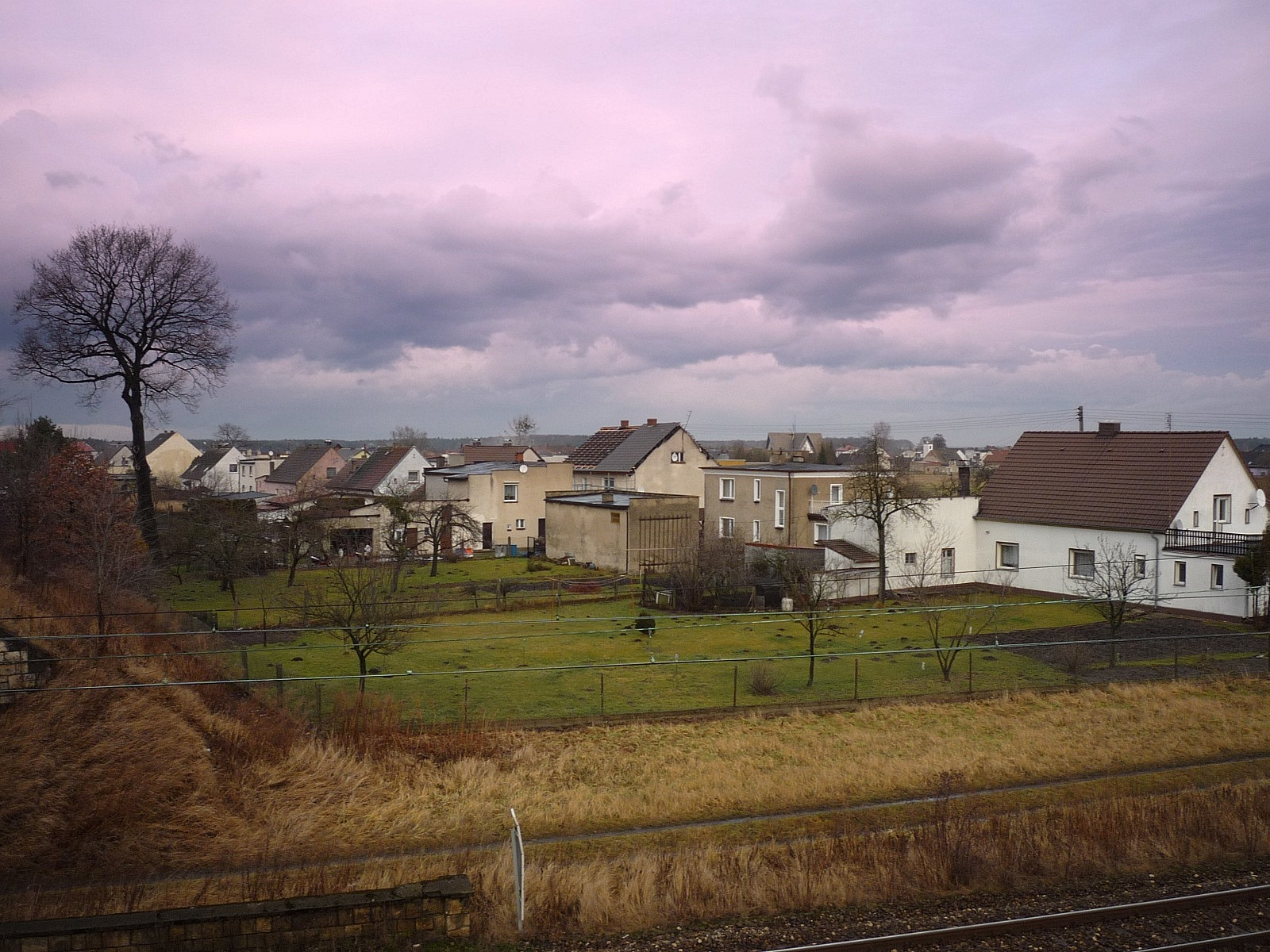

- Location within Poland
- Coordinates: 50°31′N 18°20′E
- Country: Poland
- Voivodeship: Opole
- County: Strzelce
- Gmina: Strzelce Opolskie

Dziewkowice [d͡ʑɛfkɔˈvit͡sɛ] (German: Schewkowitz) is a village in the administrative district of Gmina Strzelce Opolskie, within Strzelce County, Opole Voivodeship, in south-western Poland.
