= Grodzisko, Strzelce County =

Grodzisko
- Village
- Location within Poland
- Coordinates: 50°35′N 18°14′E
- Country: Poland
- Voivodeship: Opole
- County: Strzelce
- Gmina: Strzelce Opolskie
- Time zone: UTC+1 (CET)
  - Summer (DST): UTC+2 (CEST)
- Vehicle registration: OST

Grodzisko [ɡrɔˈd͡ʑiskɔ] (German: Grodisko) is a village in the administrative district of Gmina Strzelce Opolskie, within Strzelce County, Opole Voivodeship, in southern Poland.

The village was founded by 1429.
