= Rozmierz =

- Village
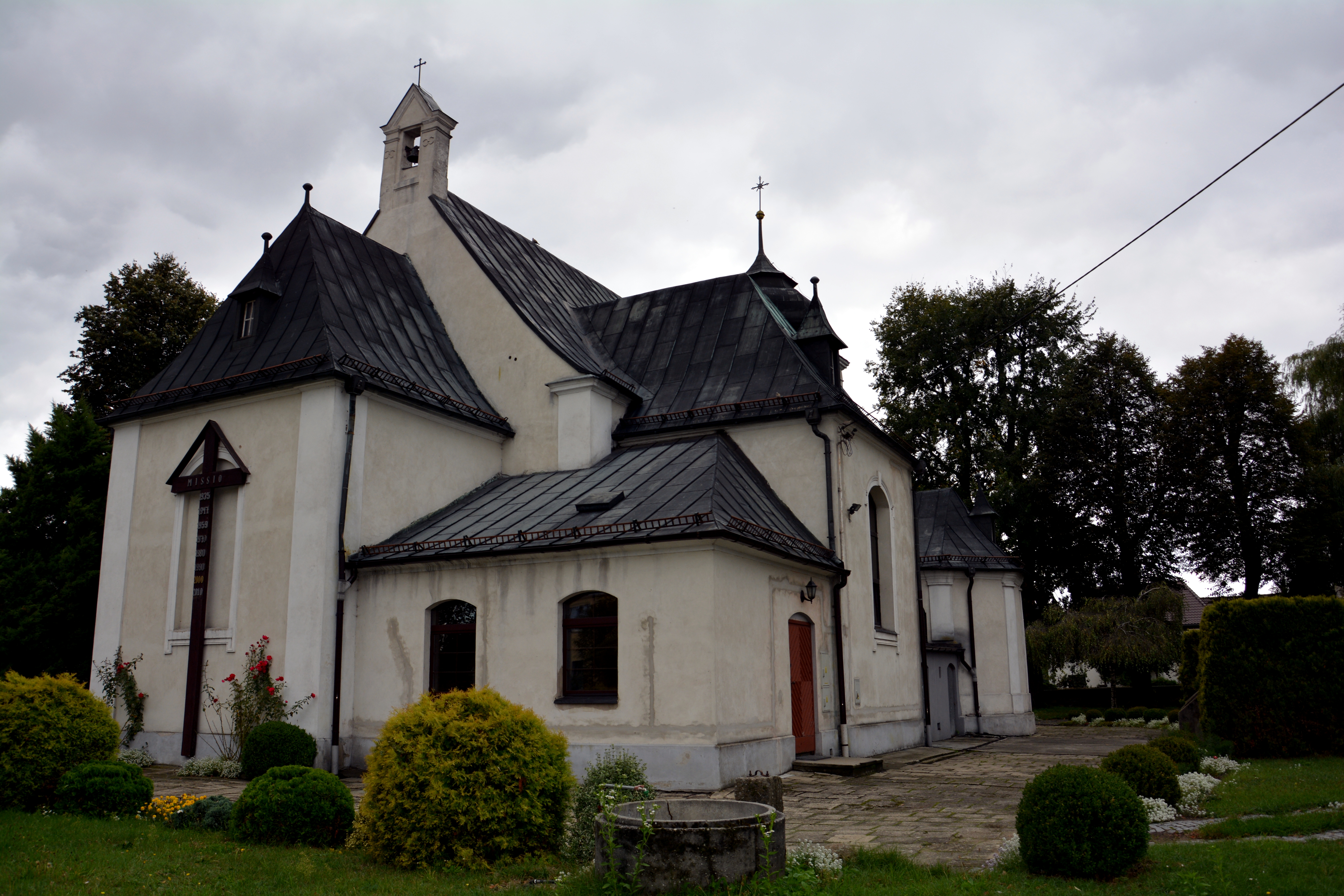
- Saint Michael church

- Location within Poland
- Coordinates: 50°33′N 18°14′E
- Country: Poland
- Voivodeship: Opole
- County: Strzelce
- Gmina: Strzelce Opolskie

Rozmierz [ˈrɔzmjɛʂ] (German: Rosmierz) is a village in the administrative district of Gmina Strzelce Opolskie, within Strzelce County, Opole Voivodeship, in south-western Poland.

== History ==
Rosmierz was first mentioned in a document in 1256. In 1742 most of Silesia was seized by Prussia. At the plebiscite in 1921 there were 139 votes in favour of Germany and 193 votes in favour of Poland. Rosmierz remained with Germany. In 1936 Rosmierz was named Angerbach/Oberschlesien. In 1945 it was named Rozmierz.
