= Kasztal =

- Village
- Location within Poland
- Coordinates: 50°36′9″N 18°18′35″E
- Country: Poland
- Voivodeship: Opole
- County: Strzelce
- Gmina: Strzelce Opolskie

Kasztal [ˈkaʂtal] is a village in the administrative district of Gmina Strzelce Opolskie, within Strzelce County, Opole Voivodeship, in south-western Poland.
