= Kadłub, Opole Voivodeship =

Kadłub
- Village
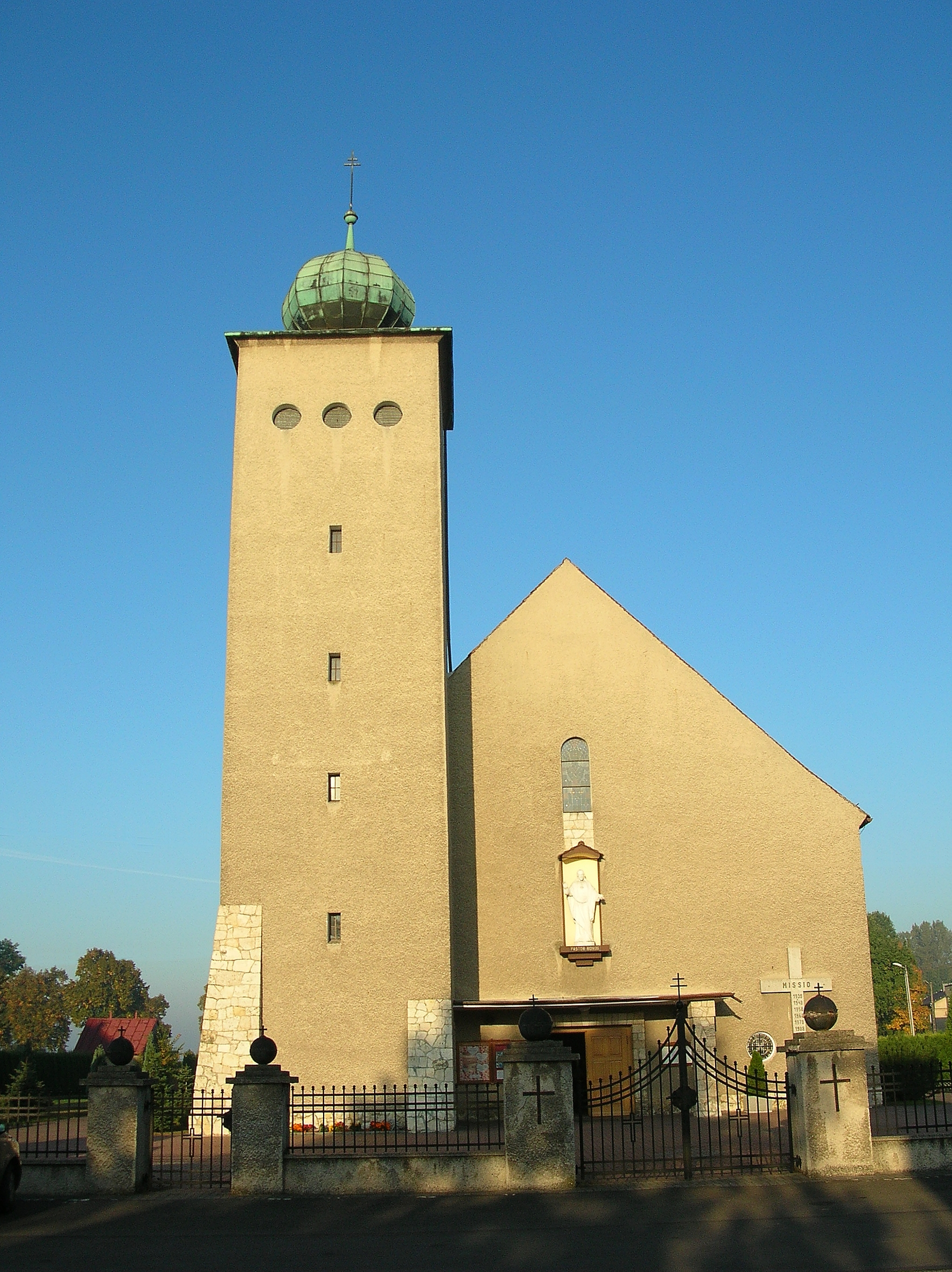
- Christ the King Church in Kadłub

- Location within Poland
- Coordinates: 50°36′N 18°16′E
- Country: Poland
- Voivodeship: Opole
- County: Strzelce
- Gmina: Strzelce Opolskie
- Time zone: UTC+1 (CET)
  - Summer (DST): UTC+2 (CEST)
- Vehicle registration: OST

Kadłub [ˈkadwup] (German: Kadlub) is a village in the administrative district of Gmina Strzelce Opolskie, within Strzelce County, Opole Voivodeship, in southern Poland.

== History ==
In the 10th century the area became part of the emerging Polish state. Over the centuries it was under the rule of Poland, the Czech Crown, the Kingdom of Prussia, and Germany. In 1936, during a Nazi campaign aimed at erasing traces of Polish origin, the village was renamed Starenheim. During World War II, the German authorities operated the E297 forced labour subcamp of the Stalag VIII-B/344 prisoner-of-war camp in the village.

Following Germany's defeat in 1945, Poland's border was moved westward and the village was reintegrated into Poland.

=== 2026 familicide ===
In 2026, Kadłub gained international attention when, on 26 February, a 17-year-old youth, named only as Łukasz G., allegedly recorded himself killing his 38-year-old stepfather and 92-year-old great-grandmother with an axe. The videos of the killings were posted on the Internet. The police found Łukasz, unarmed, hiding in a wooded area outside of town, where he was arrested without resistance. He has been placed in pre-trial detention and faces up to 30 years in prison.
