= Farska Kolonia =

- Neighbourhood of Strzelce Opolskie
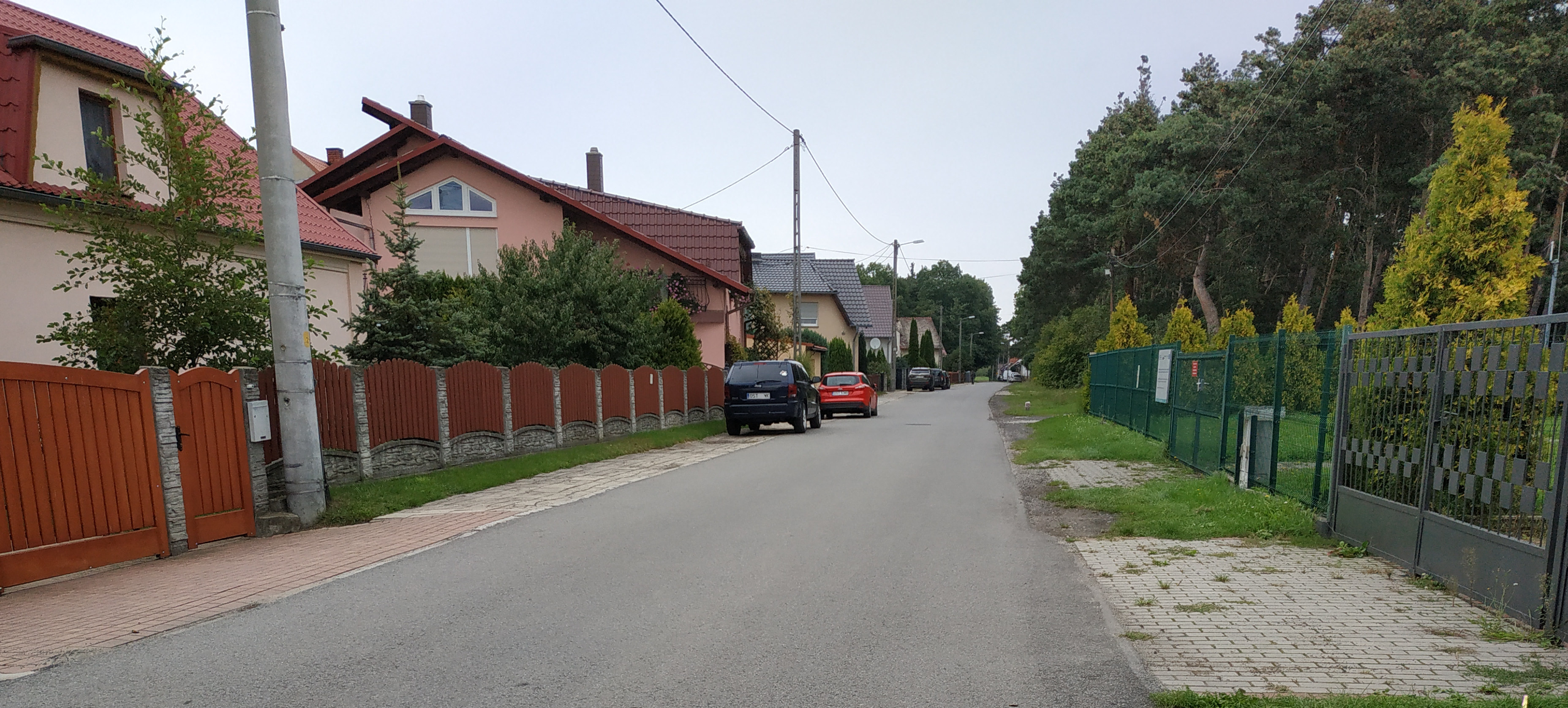

- Location within Poland
- Coordinates: 50°32′22″N 18°17′56″E
- Country: Poland
- Voivodeship: Opole
- County: Strzelce
- Gmina: Strzelce Opolskie
- Town: Strzelce Opolskie

Population
  - Total: 90
- Time zone: UTC+1 (CET)
  - Summer (DST): UTC+2 (CEST)
- Vehicle registration: OST

Farska Kolonia [ˈfarska kɔˈlɔɲa] is a neighbourhood of the town of Strzelce Opolskie, in southern Poland. Its population is estimated to be around 90 to 110 people.
