= Gmina Strzelce Opolskie =

Gmina Strzelce Opolskie Strzelce Opolskie Commune
- Gmina
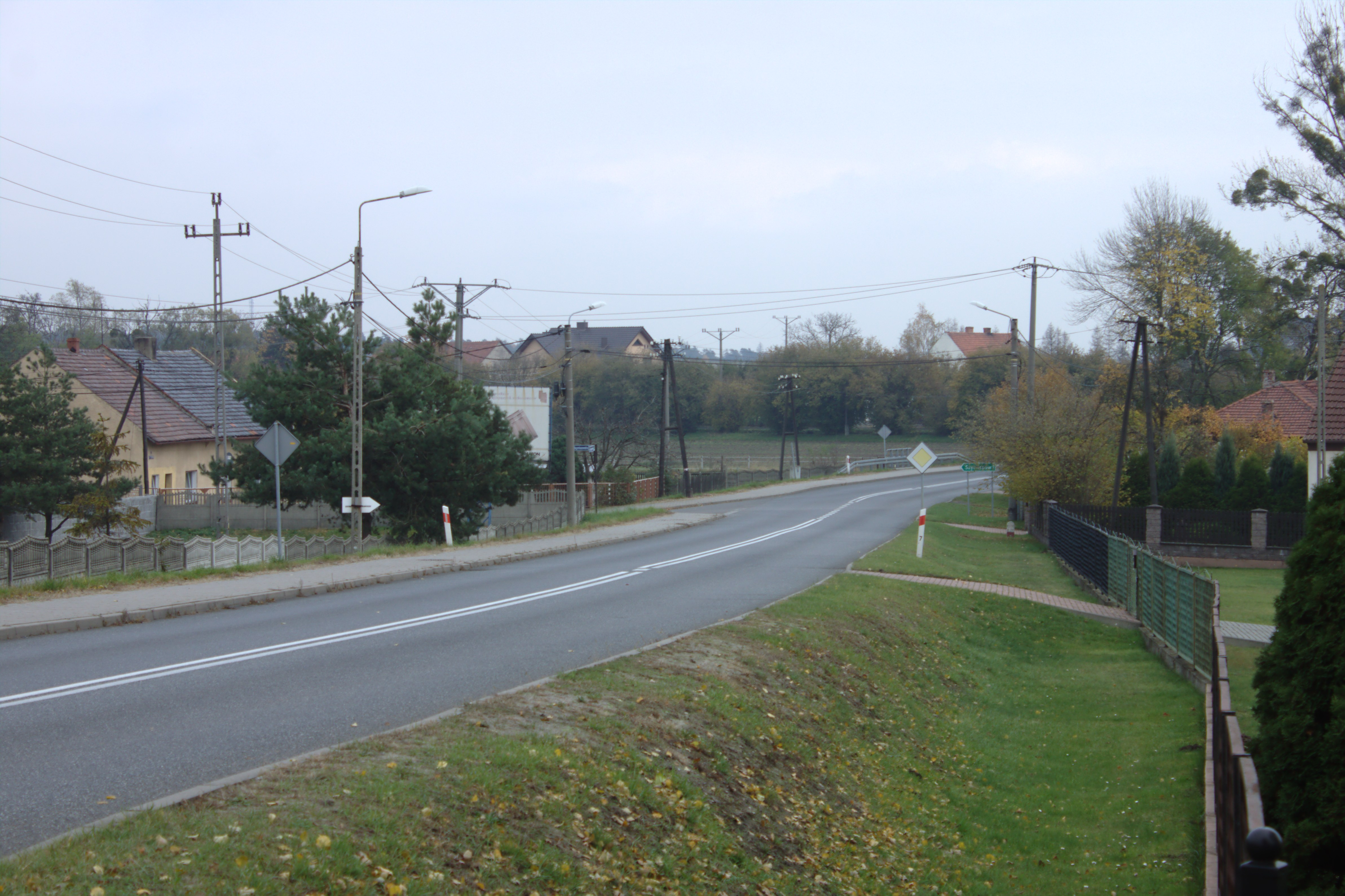
- Road in Rożniątów

- Flag Coat of arms

- Location within Poland
- Coordinates (Strzelce Opolskie): 50°30′N 18°17′E
- Country: Poland
- Voivodeship: Opole
- County: Strzelce
- Seat: Strzelce Opolskie

Area
  - Total: 202.35 km^{2} (78.13 sq mi)

Population (2019-06-30)
  - Total: 30,603
  - Density: 151.24/km^{2} (391.70/sq mi)
  - Urban: 17,900
  - Rural: 12,703
- Time zone: UTC+1 (CET)
  - Summer (DST): UTC+2 (CEST)
- Vehicle registration: OST
- Website: http://www.strzelceopolskie.pl

Gmina Strzelce Opolskie is an urban-rural gmina (administrative district) in Strzelce County, Opole Voivodeship, in southern Poland. Its seat is the town of Strzelce Opolskie, which lies approximately 31 kilometres (19 mi) south-east of the regional capital Opole.

The gmina covers an area of 202.35 square kilometres (78.1 sq mi). As of 2019, its total population was 30,603.

The gmina contains part of the protected area called Góra Świętej Anny Landscape Park.

== Villages ==
Apart from the town of Strzelce Opolskie, Gmina Strzelce Opolskie contains the villages and settlements of Adamowice, Banatki Duże, Banatki Małe, Błotnica Strzelecka, Breguła, Brzezina, Dołki, Doryszów, Dziewkowice, Farska Kolonia, Grodzisko, Groszów, Jędrynie, Kaczorownia, Kadłub, Kadłubski Piec, Kalinów, Kalinowice, Kasztal, Koszyce, Ligota Dolna, Ligota Górna, Mokre Łany, Niwki, Nowa Wieś, Osiek, Pakoszyn, Płużnica Wielka, Poręba, Rozmierka, Rozmierz, Rożniątów, Ściegna, Sucha, Suche Łany, Szczepanek, Szymiszów, Szymiszów-Osiedle, Warmątowice.

== Neighbouring gminas ==
Gmina Strzelce Opolskie is bordered by the gminas of Gogolin, Izbicko, Jemielnica, Kolonowskie, Leśnica, Ozimek, Toszek, Ujazd, Wielowieś and Zdzieszowice.

== Twin towns – sister cities ==
Gmina Strzelce Opolskie is twinned with:

- Bandera, United States
- Druskininkai, Lithuania
- Holice, Czech Republic
- Soest, Germany
- Tysmenytsia, Ukraine

== Gallery ==
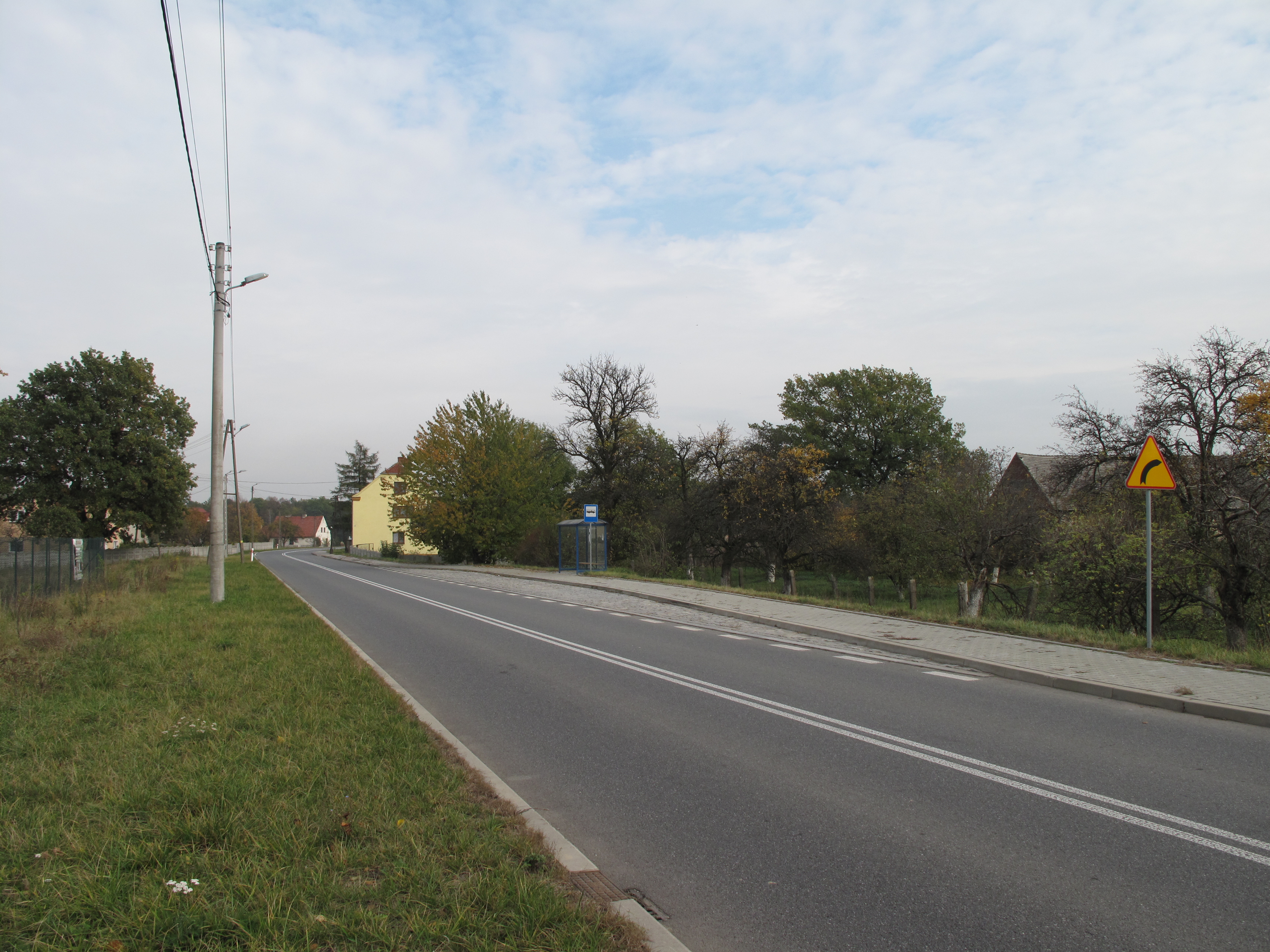
Road in Niwki

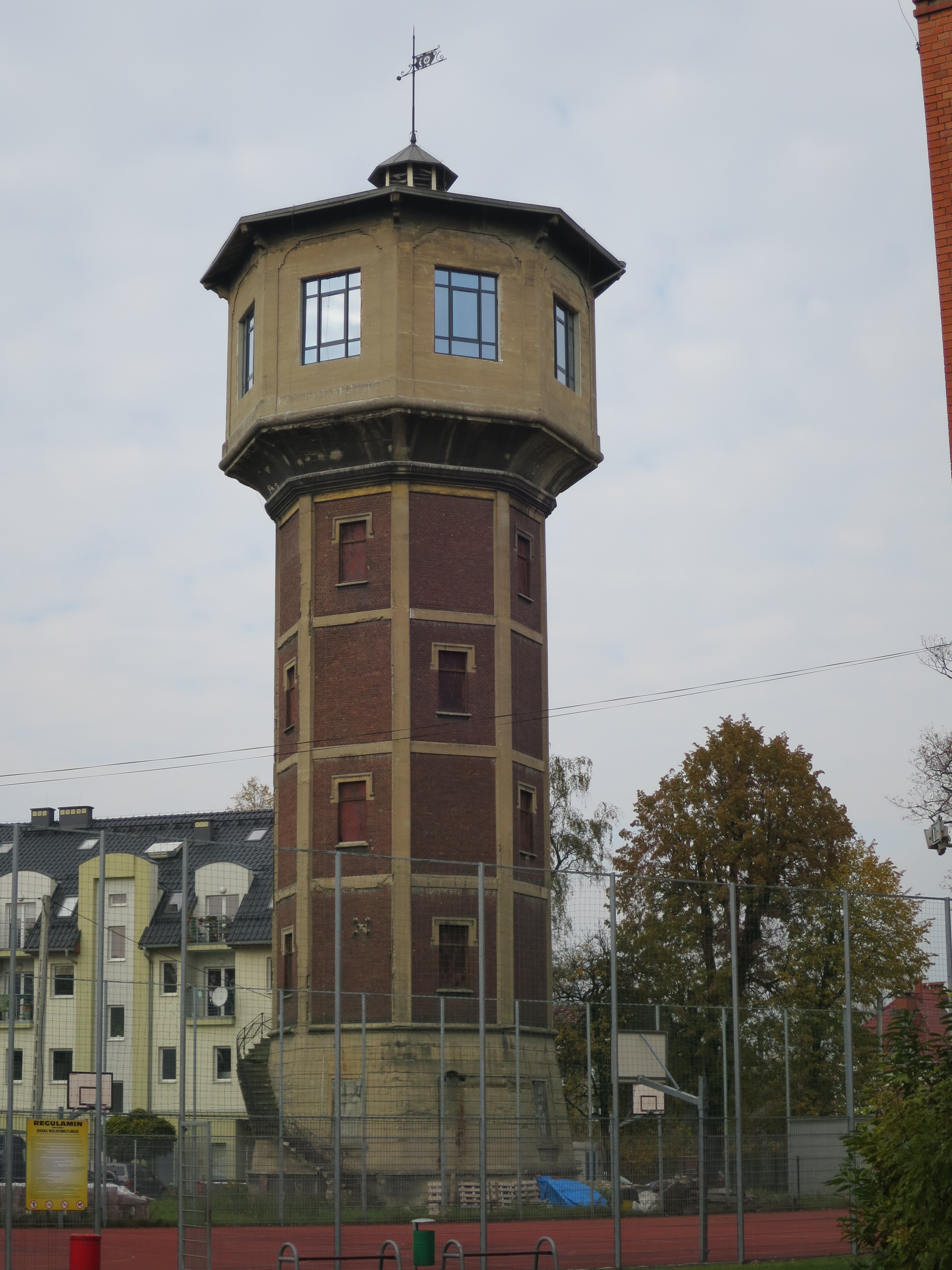
Water tower in Strzelce Opolskie
