= Adamowice, Opole Voivodeship =

Adamowice
- Neighborhood
- Location within Poland
- Coordinates: 50°31′33″N 18°17′21″E
- Country: Poland
- Voivodeship: Opole
- County: Strzelce
- Gmina: Strzelce Opolskie
- Town: Strzelce Opolskie

Population
  - Total: 411
- Time zone: UTC+1 (CET)
  - Summer (DST): UTC+2 (CEST)
- Vehicle registration: OST

Adamowice [adamɔˈvit͡sɛ] is a neighborhood of the town of Strzelce Opolskie, in southern Poland.
