= Strzelce County =

Strzelce County Powiat strzelecki
- County
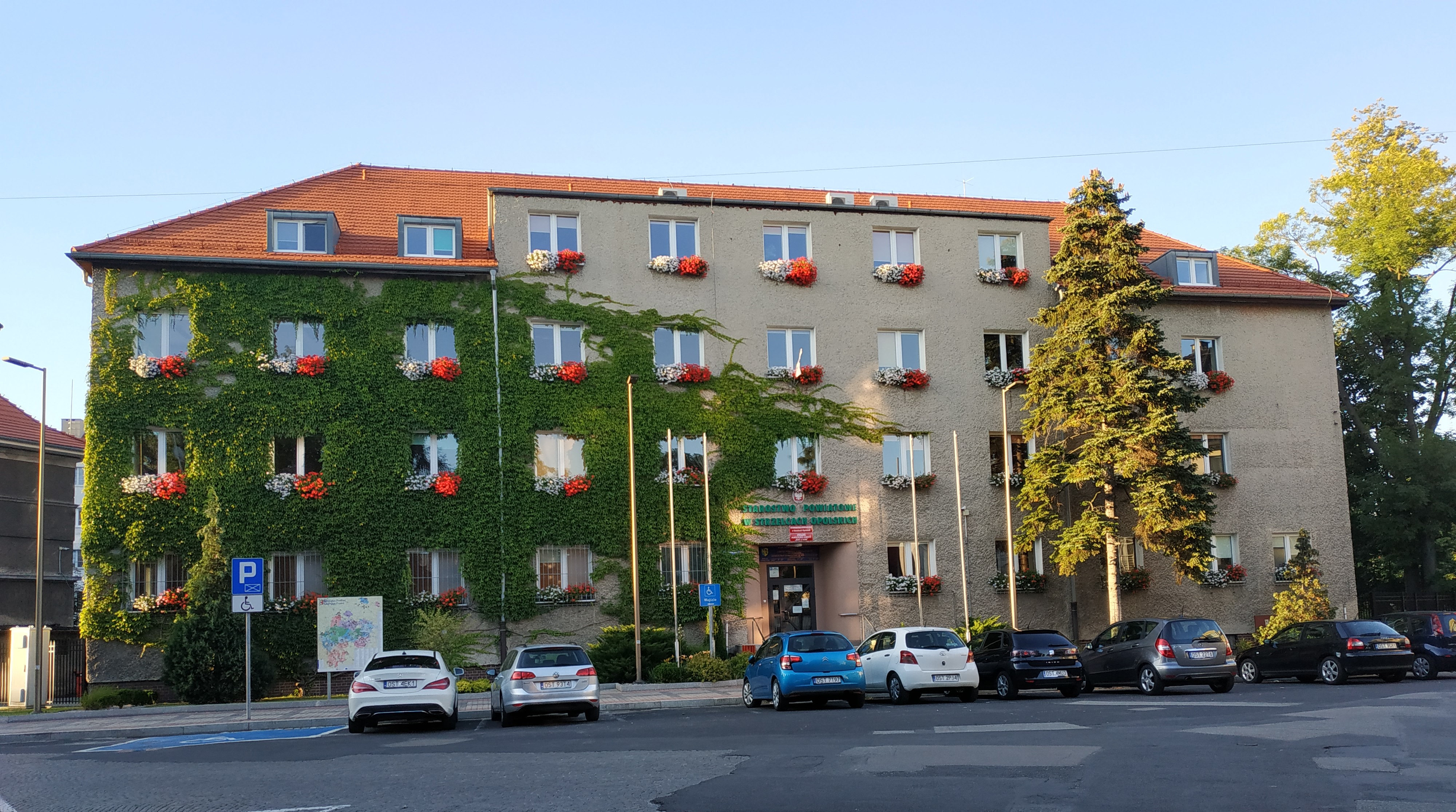
- The county's office in Strzelce Opolskie

- Flag Coat of arms

- Location within the voivodeship
- Coordinates (Strzelce Opolskie): 50°30′N 18°17′E
- Country: Poland
- Voivodeship: Opole
- Seat: Strzelce Opolskie
- Gminas: Total 7: Gmina Izbicko; Gmina Jemielnica; Gmina Kolonowskie; Gmina Leśnica; Gmina Strzelce Opolskie; Gmina Ujazd; Gmina Zawadzkie

Area
  - Total: 744.28 km^{2} (287.37 sq mi)

Population (2019-06-30)
  - Total: 74,460
  - Density: 100.0/km^{2} (259.1/sq mi)
  - Urban: 32,663
  - Rural: 41,797
- Car plates: OST
- Website: powiatstrzelecki.pl

Strzelce County (Polish: powiat strzelecki) is a unit of territorial administration and local government (powiat) in Opole Voivodeship, south-western Poland. It came into being on January 1, 1999, as a result of the Polish local government reforms passed in 1998. Its administrative seat and largest town is Strzelce Opolskie, which lies 31 kilometres (19 mi) south-east of the regional capital Opole. The county contains four other towns: Zawadzkie, 19 km (12 mi) north-east of Strzelce Opolskie, Kolonowskie, 19 km (12 mi) north-east of Strzelce Opolskie, Leśnica, 11 km (7 mi) south-west of Strzelce Opolskie, and Ujazd, 14 km (9 mi) south-east of Strzelce Opolskie.

The county covers an area of 744.28 square kilometres (287.4 sq mi). As of 2019 its total population is 74,460. The most populated towns are Strzelce Opolskie with 17,900 inhabitants, and Zawadzkie with 7,135 inhabitants.

== Neighbouring counties ==
Strzelce County is bordered by Olesno County to the north, Lubliniec County to the north-east, Tarnowskie Góry County to the east, Gliwice County to the south-east, Kędzierzyn-Koźle County to the south, Krapkowice County to the west and Opole County to the north-west.

== Administrative division ==
The county is subdivided into seven gminas (five urban-rural and two rural). These are listed in the following table, in descending order of population.

| Gmina | Type | Area (km^{2}) | Population (2019) | Seat |
|---|---|---|---|---|
| Gmina Strzelce Opolskie | urban-rural | 202.4 | 30,603 | Strzelce Opolskie |
| Gmina Zawadzkie | urban-rural | 82.2 | 11,341 | Zawadzkie |
| Gmina Leśnica | urban-rural | 94.6 | 7,569 | Leśnica |
| Gmina Jemielnica | rural | 113.2 | 7,219 | Jemielnica |
| Gmina Ujazd | urban-rural | 83.3 | 6,418 | Ujazd |
| Gmina Kolonowskie | urban-rural | 83.6 | 5,895 | Kolonowskie |
| Gmina Izbicko | rural | 84.9 | 5,415 | Izbicko |
