= Opolski =

Opolski (feminine Opolska, neuter Opolskie, plural Opolscy) may refer to:

- Uniwersytet Opolski
- Politechnika Opolska
- Powiat opolski (disambiguation)
- Opole Voivodeship (Province) (Polish: województwo opolskie)
- Góry Opolskie
- Kąty Opolskie
- Rogów Opolski
- Strzelce Opolskie
  - Gmina Strzelce Opolskie
  - Strzelce Opolskie County
- Tarnów Opolski
  - Gmina Tarnów Opolski

Family name

- Jarosław Opolski (means "Jarosław, Duke of Opole")
- Nicholas Opolski, an Australian actor
- Władysław Opolski (means "Władysław of Opole")

== See also ==
- Władysław Opolczyk
- Oppolzer
