= Granitsa =

Granitsa may refer to the following places:

== Bulgaria ==
- Granitsa, Kyustendil Province

== Greece ==
- Granitsa, Evrytania
- Granitsa, Ioannina
- Diakopi, formerly known as Granitsa, Phocis
- Nymfasia, formerly known as Granitsa, Arcadia

== See also ==
- Stefanos Granitsas (1881–1915), Greek writer
- Granica (disambiguation)
- Granice (disambiguation)
- Granita (disambiguation)
- Hranice (disambiguation)
