= Raszowa =

Raszowa may refer to the following places in Poland:

- Raszowa, Lower Silesian Voivodeship (south-west Poland)
- Raszowa, Gmina Tarnów Opolski, Opole County in Opole Voivodeship (south-west Poland)
- Raszowa, Strzelce County in Opole Voivodeship (south-west Poland)
