= Granitz (disambiguation) =

Granitz may refer to:

- The Granitz a region and nature reserve on Germany's largest island, Rügen, in the state of Mecklenburg-Western Pomerania, which has given its name to:
  - Granitz Hunting Lodge, a former hunting lodge and now a tourist attraction on Rügen
  - Granitz House, a former forester's lodge and inn which is today the information centre for the Southeast Rügen Biosphere Reserve
  - Mönchgut-Granitz, a subdistrict or Amt on Rügen
  - Lancken-Granitz, a municipality in the above subdistrict
  - Granitzer Ort, a headland on the east coast of Rügen

- Granitz, a common geographic and family name in Austria and Bavaria. It is derived from the Old Slavic word Granica = border.
  - Granitz (Eichendorf), village in the market borough of Eichendorf, Dingolfing-Landau district, Bavaria
  - Granitz (Reisbach), village in the market borough of Reisbach, Dingolfing-Landau district, Bavaria
  - Granitz (Bach) in Carinthia, Austria
  - Granitz (hill), wooded heights höhe south of the Lavanttal valley
  - Granitzen, a former independent municipality on the border of Styria and Carinthia in Austria
  - Granitzenbach, a roughly 40 km long waterbody in the west of Styria, Austria
- Surname
  - Ignjat Granitz (1845–1908), known Croatian industrialist, philanthropist and publisher

== See also ==
- Granica (disambiguation)
