= Kupferberg (disambiguation) =

Kupferberg is a municipality in the district of Kulmbach, in Bavaria, Germany.

Kupferberg may also refer to:

- The German name for Miedzianka, Lower Silesian Voivodeship, Poland
- The German name for Měděnec, Ústí nad Labem Region, Czech Republic
- The German name for Miedziana, Opole Voivodeship, Poland
- The Kupferberg Center for the Arts, at Queens College, City University of New York

== People ==
- Herbert Kupferberg (1918–2001), American music critic and editor
- Tuli Kupferberg (1923–2010), American counterculture poet, author and publisher
- Dr. Eliot Kupferberg, a character from the television series The Sopranos

== See also ==
- Kuperberg, a surname
- Kupperberg, a surname
