= Dolna =

Dolna may refer to:

- Dolna, Strzelce County, a village in Gmina Leśnica, Poland
- Dolna, Strășeni, a commune in Strășeni District, Moldova
- Dolna (film), a 1990 Bangladeshi film
