= Kuperberg =

Kuperberg is a surname. Notable people with the surname include:

- Włodzimierz Kuperberg (born 1941), professor of mathematics
- Krystyna Kuperberg (born 1944), Polish-American mathematician
- Greg Kuperberg (born 1967), Polish-American mathematician

== See also ==
- Kupperberg (disambiguation)
- Kupferberg (disambiguation)
