= Granica =

Granica may refer to:

== Places ==
=== Poland ===
- Granica, Lower Silesian Voivodeship (south-west Poland)
- Granica, Podkarpackie Voivodeship (south-east Poland)
- Granica, Warsaw West County in Masovian Voivodeship (east-central Poland)
- Granica, Opole Voivodeship (south-west Poland)
- Granica, West Pomeranian Voivodeship (north-west Poland)

=== Serbia ===
- Granica, Bojnik

== Other uses ==
- Granica (film), a 1938 Polish film directed by Joseph Lejtes
- Granica (grape), another name for the Italian wine grape Aglianico
- Granica, or The Frontier, a novel by the Polish writer Zofia Nałkowska

== See also ==
- Granitsa (disambiguation)
- Granice (disambiguation)
- Hranice (disambiguation)
