= Nakło, Opole Voivodeship =

Nakło
- Village
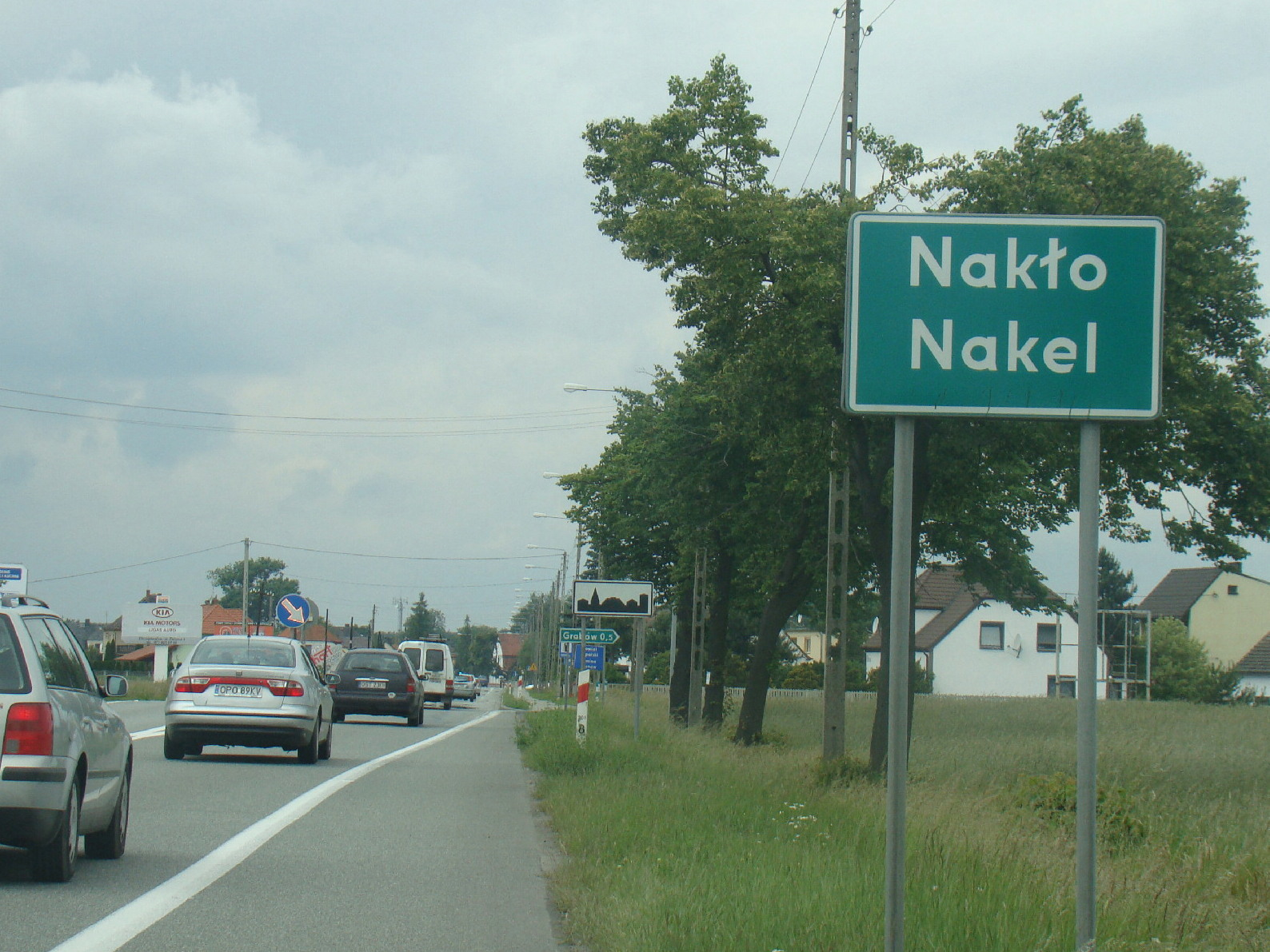

- Location within Poland
- Coordinates: 50°35′N 18°7′E
- Country: Poland
- Voivodeship: Opole
- County: Opole
- Gmina: Tarnów Opolski
- Population: 1,500

Nakło [ˈnakwɔ] is a village in the administrative district of Gmina Tarnów Opolski, within Opole County, Opole Voivodeship, in south-western Poland. It is approximately 3 km (2 mi) east of Tarnów Opolski and 16 km (10 mi) south-east of the regional capital Opole.
