= Popice =

Popice may refer to places:

- Popice, Czech Republic, a municipality in the South Moravian Region
- Popice, a village and part of Znojmo in the South Moravian Region
- Popice, Poland, a village
