= Kurzawka =

- Village
- Location within Poland
- Coordinates: 50°23′41″N 18°11′22″E
- Country: Poland
- Voivodeship: Opole
- County: Strzelce
- Gmina: Leśnica

Kurzawka [kuˈʐafka] (German Kuschofka, Kuschowka, 1939–1945 Kuschhofen; Silesian Kuszówka) is a settlement belonging to the sołectwo of Raszowa in the administrative district of Gmina Leśnica, within Strzelce County, Opole Voivodeship, in south-western Poland.
