= Granice =

Granice may refer to:

- Granice, Łódź Voivodeship (central Poland)
- Granice, Lublin Voivodeship (east Poland)
- Granice, Masovian Voivodeship (east-central Poland)
- Granice, Gmina Trzcinica in Greater Poland Voivodeship (west-central Poland)
- Granice, Lubusz Voivodeship (west Poland)
- Dyminy-Granice, Poland
- Granice, Busovača, Bosnia and Herzegovina
- Granice (Mladenovac), Serbia

== See also ==
- Granica (disambiguation)
- Granitsa (disambiguation)
