= Lichynia =

Lichynia Lichinia
- Village
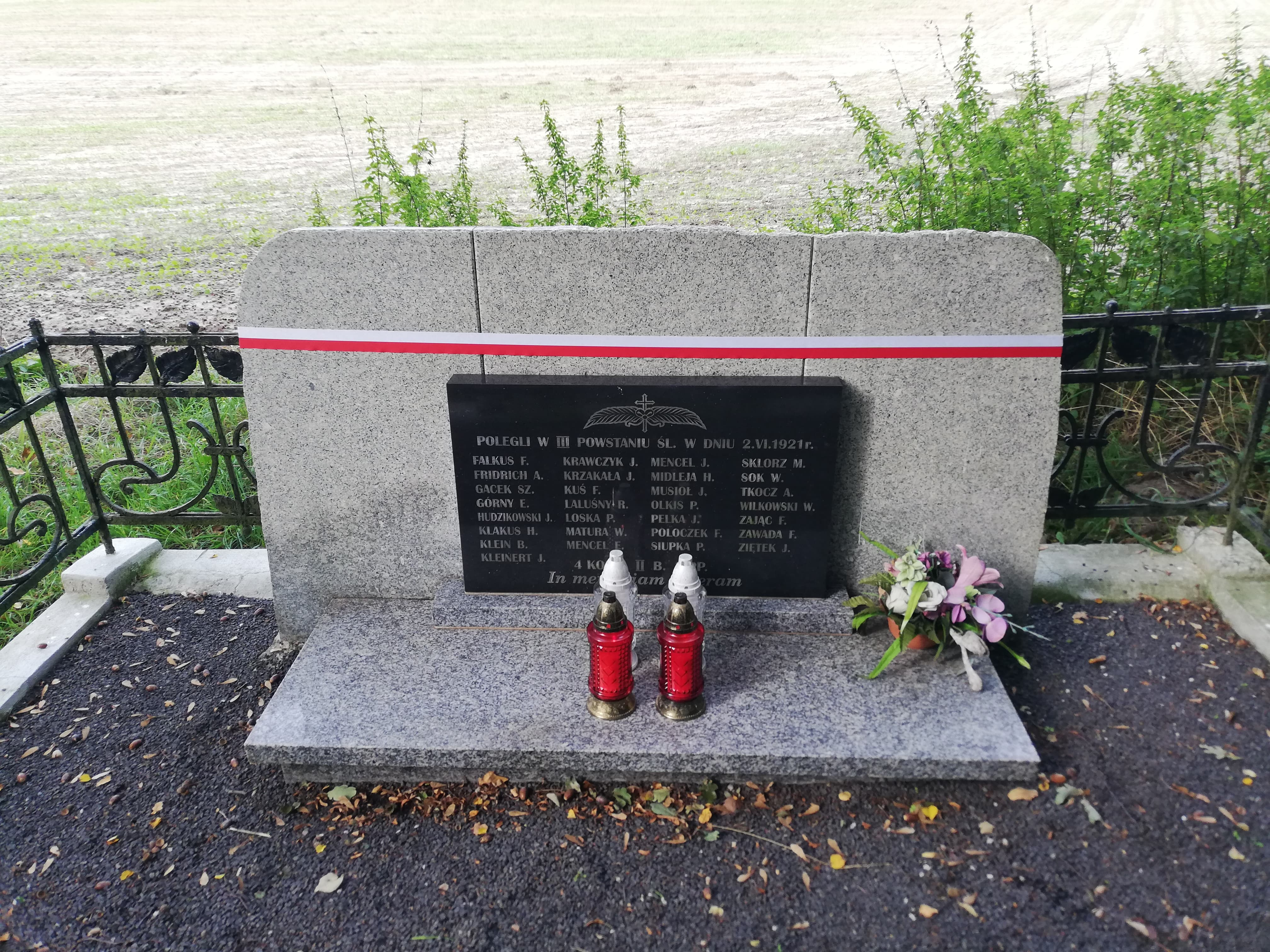
- Mass grave of Polish insurgents murdered by the Germans in 1921

- Location within Poland
- Coordinates: 50°25′N 18°13′E
- Country: Poland
- Voivodeship: Opole
- County: Strzelce
- Gmina: Leśnica
- First mentioned: 1223
- Time zone: UTC+1 (CET)
  - Summer (DST): UTC+2 (CEST)
- Postal code: 47-150
- Vehicle registration: OST
- Website: https://web.archive.org/web/20090328093909/http://lichynia.info/

Lichynia ([liˈxɨɲa], additional name in German: Lichinia) is a village in the administrative district of Gmina Leśnica, within Strzelce County, Opole Voivodeship, in southern Poland.

== History ==
The oldest known mention of the village comes from 1223, when it was part of Piast-ruled Poland.

In the 18th century, the village was annexed by Prussia, and from 1871 it was also part of Germany. In the late 19th century, it had a population of 728. During the Third Silesian Uprising, in 1921, the village was the site of a German massacre of captured Polish insurgents. In 1936, the German administration renamed the village Lichtenforst to erase traces of Polish origin. The village became again part of Poland following Germany's defeat in World War II, and its historic name was restored.
