= Przywory, Opole Voivodeship =

Przywory
- Village
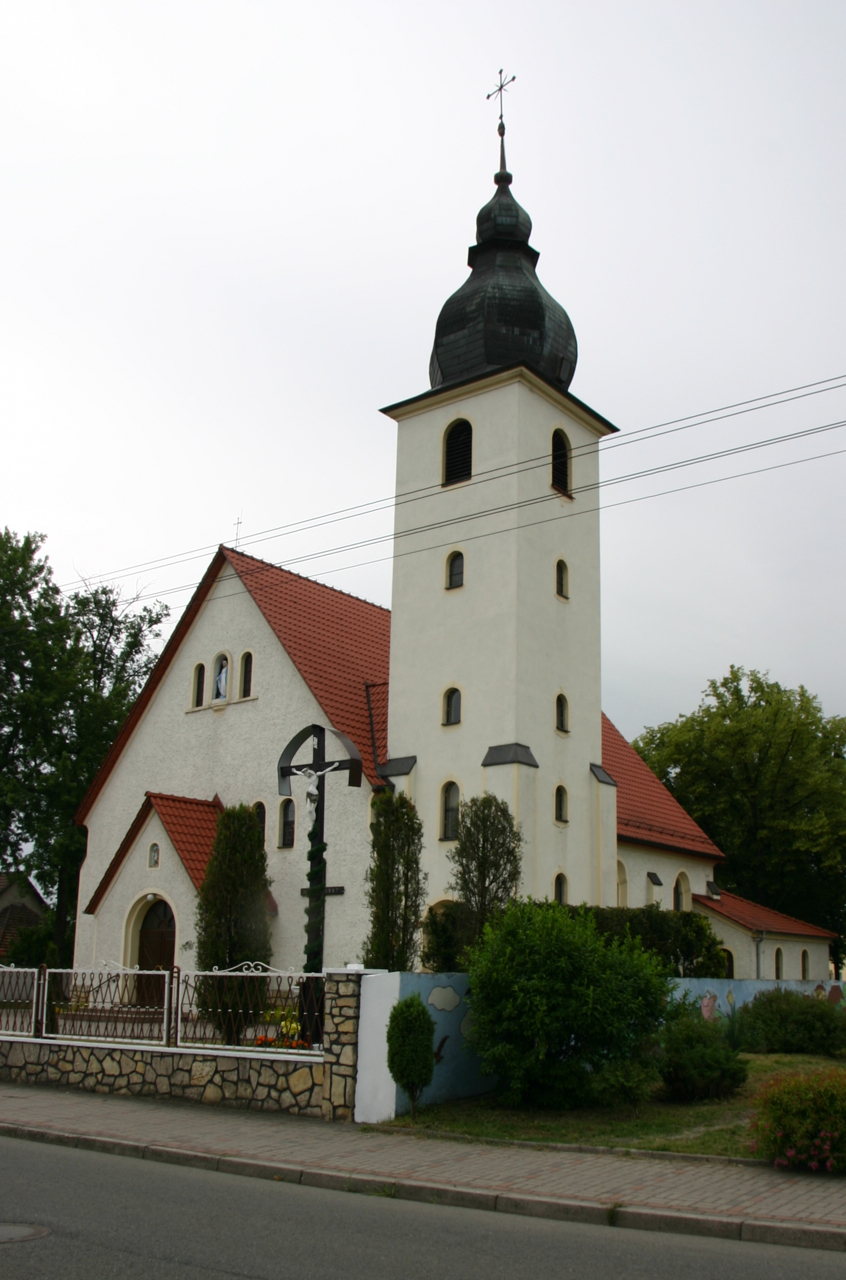
- Our Lady of the Angels church in Przywory

- Location within Poland
- Coordinates: 50°35′N 18°0′E
- Country: Poland
- Voivodeship: Opole
- County: Opole
- Gmina: Tarnów Opolski
- Population: 1,174
- Time zone: UTC+1 (CET)
  - Summer (DST): UTC+2 (CEST)
- Vehicle registration: OPO

Przywory [pʂɨˈvɔrɨ] is a village in the administrative district of Gmina Tarnów Opolski, within Opole County, Opole Voivodeship, in southern Poland.

== History ==
In the 10th century the area became part of the emerging Polish state, and later on, it was part of Poland, Bohemia (Czechia) under the Holy Roman Empire, and Kingdom of Prussia. In 1936, during a massive Nazi campaign of renaming of placenames, the village was renamed to Oderfest to erase traces of Polish origin. During World War II, the German administration operated the E150 forced labour subcamp of the Stalag VIII-B/344 prisoner-of-war camp in the village. After the defeat of Germany in the war, in 1945, the village became again part of Poland and its historic name was restored.

== Transport ==
The Voivodeship road 423 passes through the village, and the A4 motorway runs nearby, south of the village. The village also has a train station.
