= Granita (disambiguation) =

Granita is an Italian frozen dessert.

Granita may also refer to:

- Granita Pact, a political agreement between Tony Blair and Gordon Brown in 1994
- Granița River, a tributary of the Neagra River in Romania

== See also ==
- Granitsa (disambiguation)
