= Wysoka, Strzelce County =

Wysoka Wyssoka
- Village
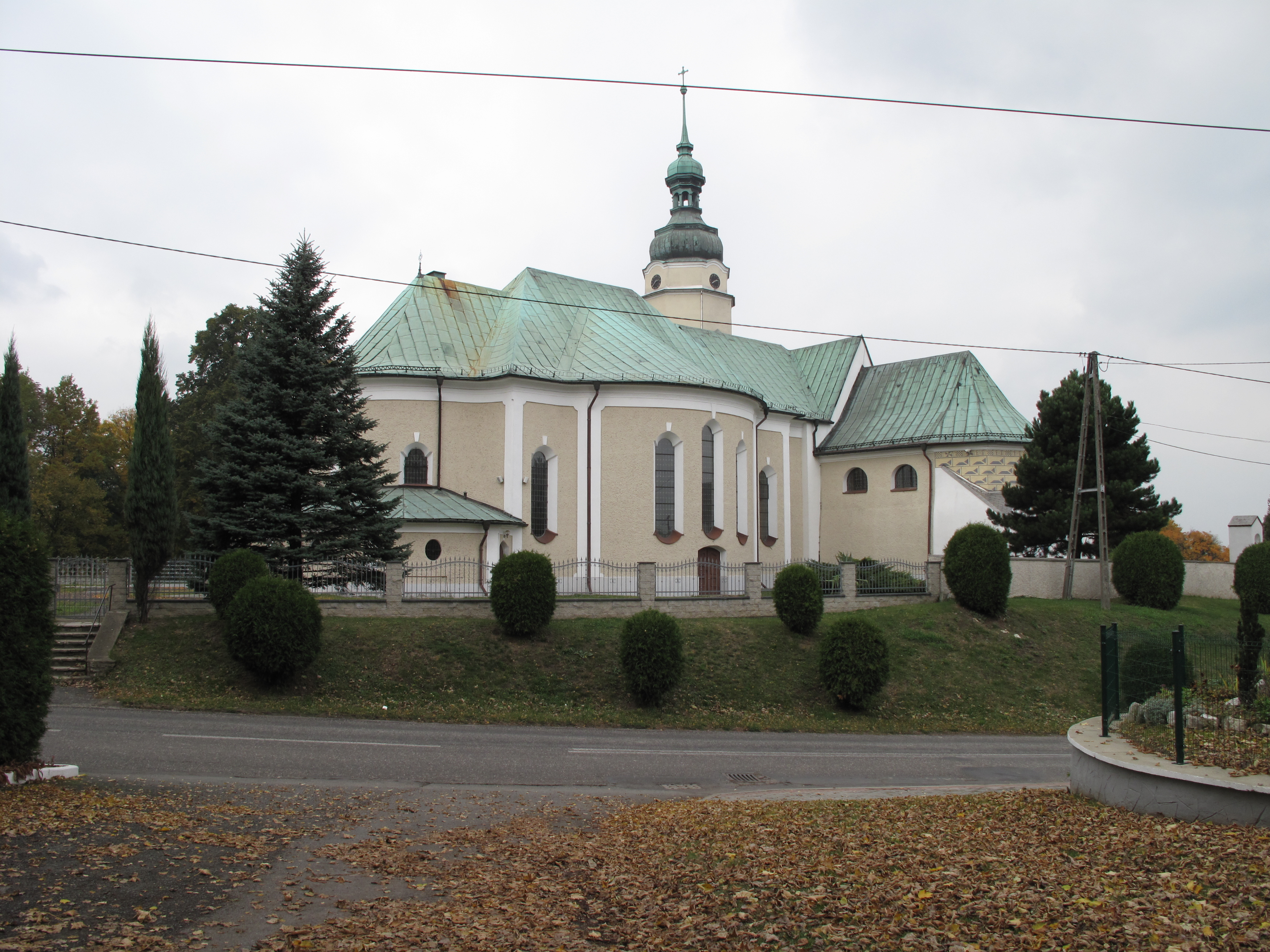
- Church of St. Florian

- Location within Poland
- Coordinates: 50°28′N 18°10′E
- Country: Poland
- Voivodeship: Opole
- County: Strzelce
- Gmina: Leśnica
- Time zone: UTC+1 (CET)
  - Summer (DST): UTC+2 (CEST)
- Postal code: 47-154
- Vehicle registration: OST

Wysoka ([vɨˈsɔka], additional name in German: Wyssoka) is a village in the administrative district of Gmina Leśnica, within Strzelce County, Opole Voivodeship, in southern Poland.

The name of the village is of Polish origin and comes from the word wysoka, which means "high", referring to the elevation of the village.
