= Walidrogi =

- Village
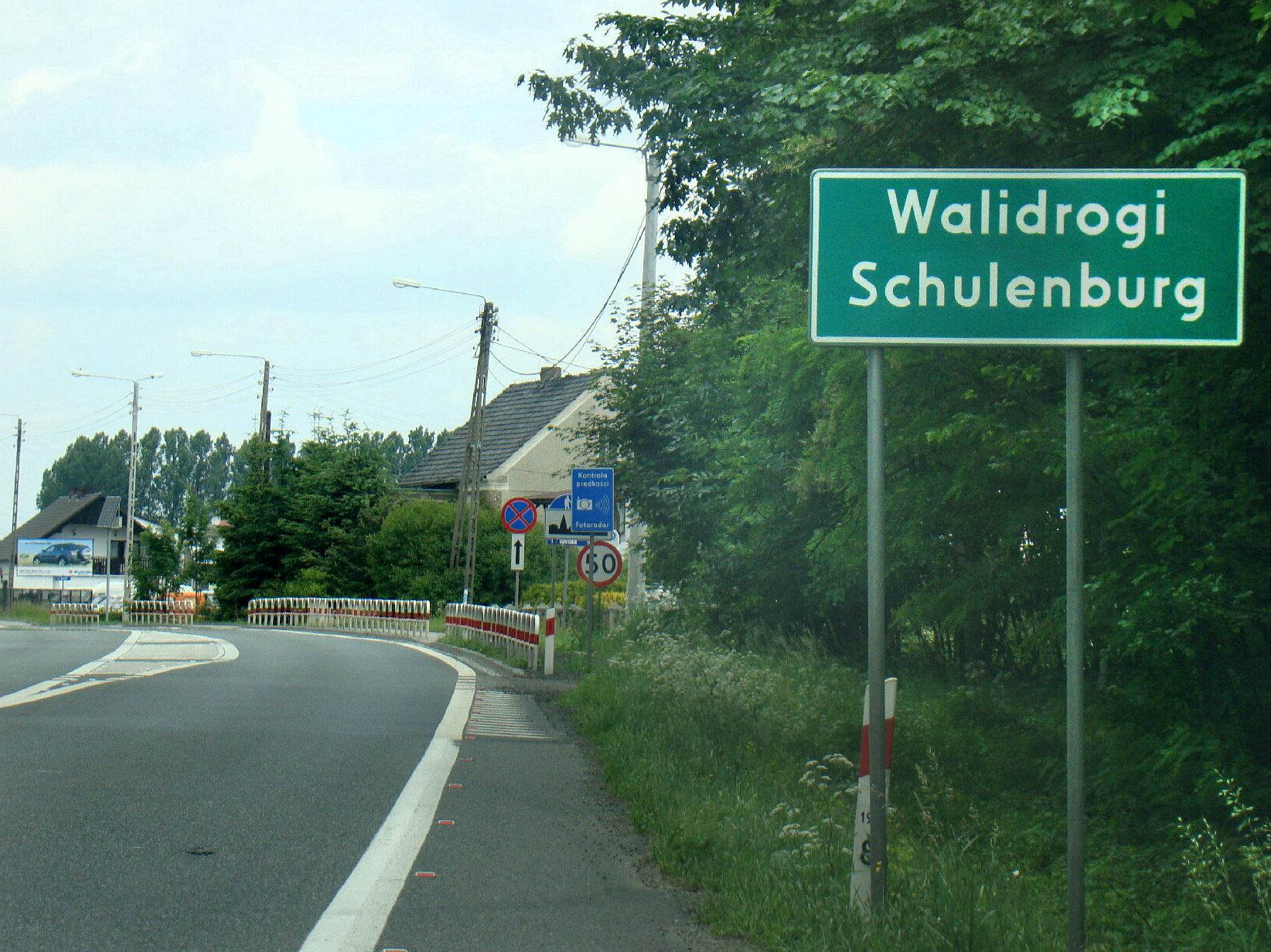

- Location within Poland
- Coordinates: 50°36′N 18°4′E
- Country: Poland
- Voivodeship: Opole
- County: Opole
- Gmina: Tarnów Opolski

Walidrogi [valiˈdrɔɡi] is a village in the administrative district of Gmina Tarnów Opolski, within Opole County, Opole Voivodeship, in south-western Poland.

The settlement was established in 1773 at the behest of the Prussian government under King Frederick the Great, who had conquered the lands in the First Silesian War of 1740–42. It was named after the Prussian minister von der Schulenburg. Like several other townships around Opole, it is officially bilingual in Polish and German.
