= Czarnocin, Opole Voivodeship =

Czarnocin Scharnosin
- Village
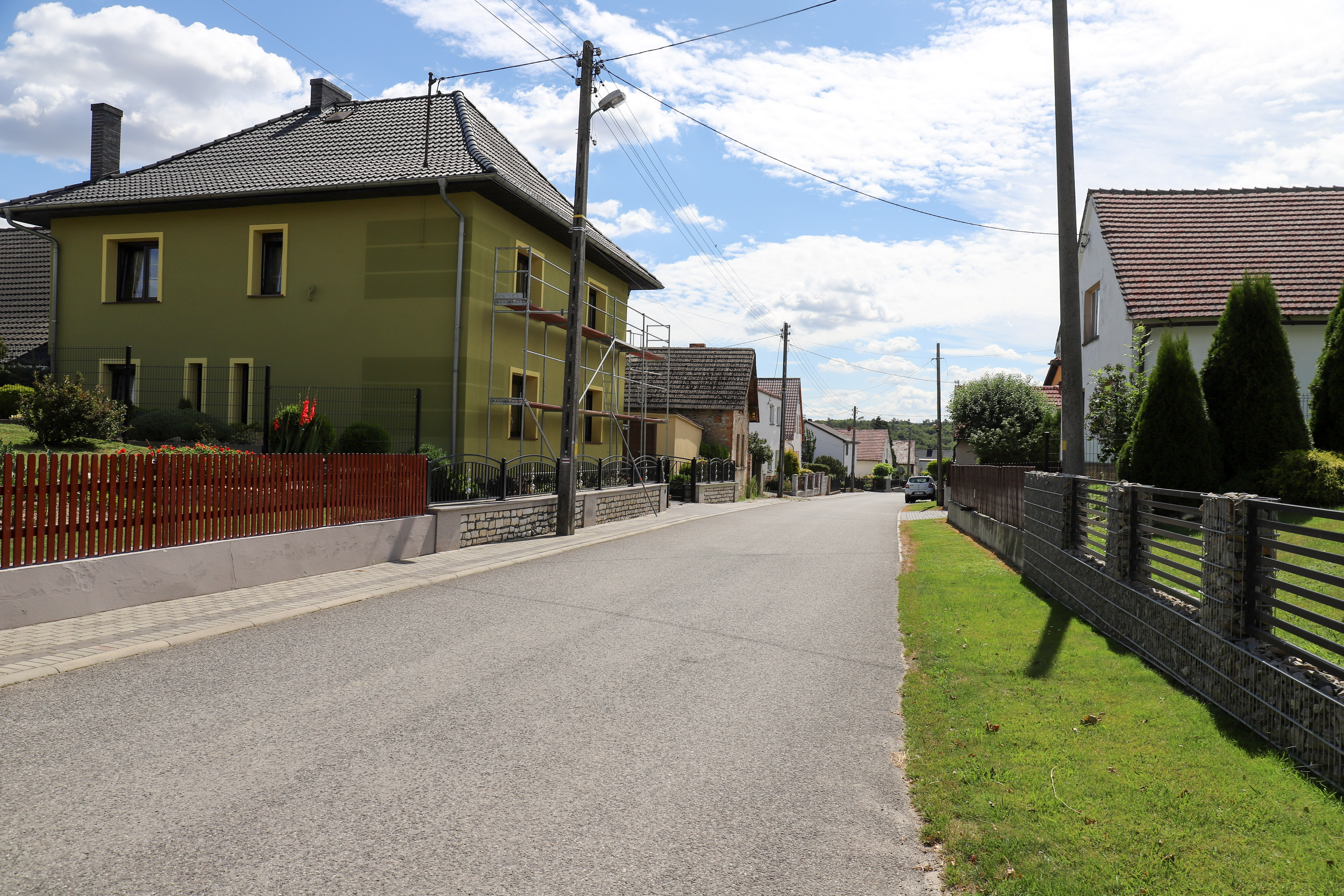

- Location within Poland
- Coordinates: 50°26′N 18°14′E
- Country: Poland
- Voivodeship: Opole
- County: Strzelce
- Gmina: Leśnica

Population
  - Total: 170
- Postal code: 47-150

Czarnocin ([t͡ʂarˈnɔt͡ɕin], additional name in German: Scharnosin) is a village in the administrative district of Gmina Leśnica, within Strzelce County, Opole Voivodeship, in southern Poland.
