= Poręba, Gmina Leśnica =

Poręba Poremba
- Village
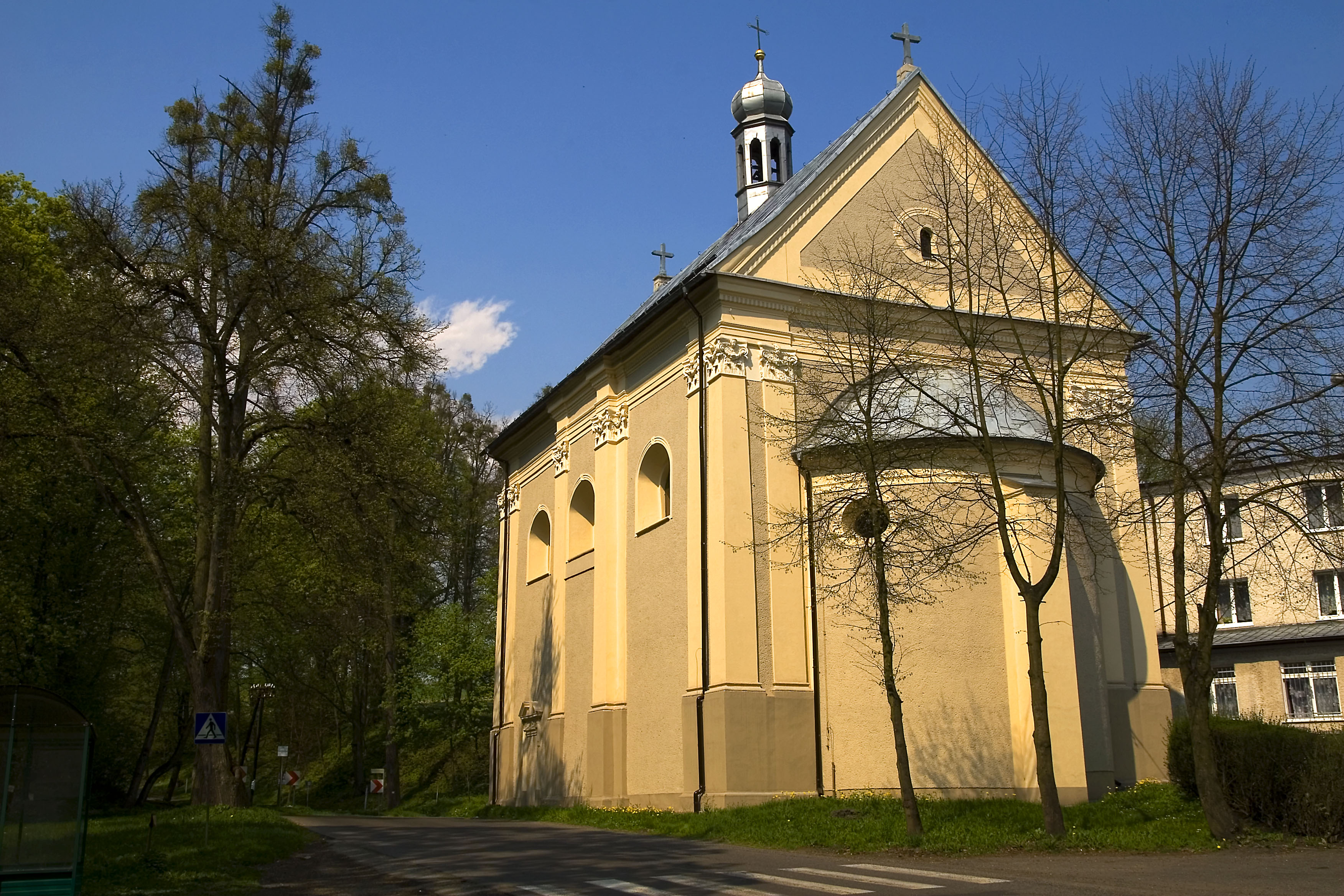
- Church of the Assumption of Mary in Poręba

- Location within Poland
- Coordinates: 50°27′N 18°11′E
- Country: Poland
- Voivodeship: Opole
- County: Strzelce
- Gmina: Leśnica
- Time zone: UTC+1 (CET)
  - Summer (DST): UTC+2 (CEST)
- Postal code: 47-150
- Vehicle registration: OST

Poręba (Polish pronunciation: ['pɔˈrɛmba]), additional name in German: Poremba) is a village in the administrative district of Gmina Leśnica, within Strzelce County, Opole Voivodeship, in southern Poland.

== History ==
Poręba was first mentioned 1485 as Poramba. The village belonged to Strela family throughout the 15th and 16th centuries, the founders of the first church on the St Anna Mountain (Góra Świętej Anny). Since 1637 the settlement belonged to Melchior Ferdynand Gaszyn.
