= Gmina Leśnica =

Gmina Leśnica Gemeinde Leschnitz Leśnica Commune
- Gmina
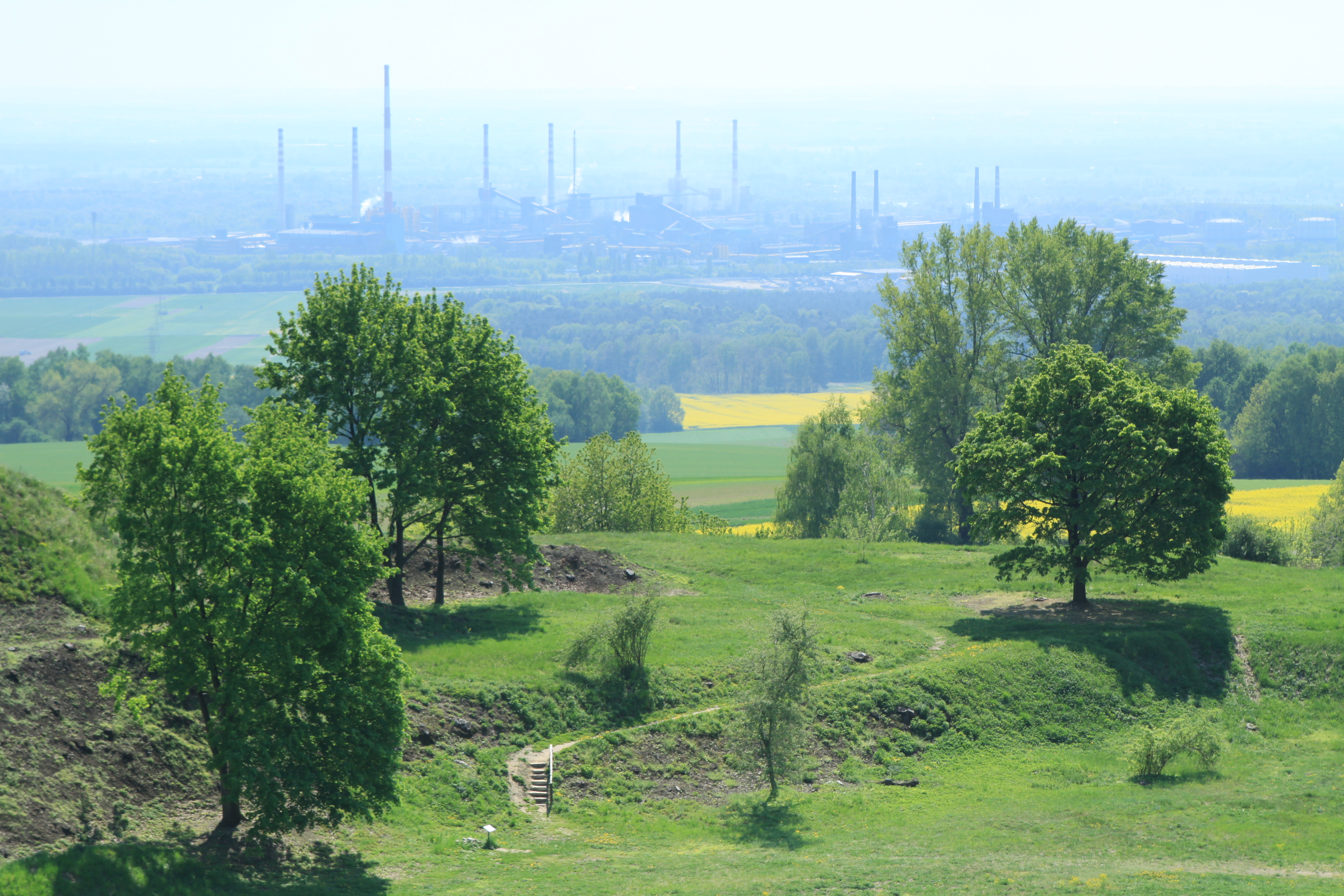
- Nature and factory

- Flag Coat of arms
- Interactive map of Gmina Leśnica
- Coordinates (Leśnica): 50°25′45″N 18°10′52″E
- Country: Poland
- Voivodeship: Opole
- County: Strzelce
- Seat: Leśnica

Area
  - Total: 94.63 km^{2} (36.54 sq mi)

Population (2019-06-30)
  - Total: 7,569
  - Density: 79.99/km^{2} (207.2/sq mi)
  - Urban: 2,556
  - Rural: 5,013
- Time zone: UTC+1 (CET)
  - Summer (DST): UTC+2 (CEST)
- Vehicle registration: OST
- Website: http://www.lesnica.pl

Gmina Leśnica (German: Gemeinde Leschnitz) is an urban-rural gmina (administrative district) in Strzelce County, Opole Voivodeship, in Upper Silesia in southern Poland. Its seat is the town of Leśnica, which lies approximately 11 kilometres (7 mi) south-west of Strzelce Opolskie and 32 km (20 mi) south-east of the regional capital Opole.

The gmina covers an area of 94.63 square kilometres (36.5 sq mi). As of 2019, its total population was 7,569. Since 2006, the commune has been bilingual in Polish and German, with a substantial German population remaining in the area after World War II.

The gmina contains part of the protected area called Góra Świętej Anny Landscape Park.

== Villages ==
The commune contains the towns and villages of:

- Leśnica
- Czarnocin
- Dolna
- Góra Świętej Anny
- Granica
- Kadłubiec
- Krasowa
- Kurzawka
- Łąki Kozielskie
- Lichynia
- Popice
- Poręba
- Raszowa
- Wysoka
- Zalesie Śląskie

== Neighbouring districts ==
Gmina Leśnica is bordered by the town of Kędzierzyn-Koźle and by the communes of Strzelce Opolskie, Ujazd and Zdzieszowice.

== Twin towns – sister cities ==
Gmina Leśnica is twinned with:

- Černošice, Czech Republic
- Crostwitz, Germany
- Gerbrunn, Germany
- Hirschaid, Germany
- Karnes County, United States
- Voitsberg, Austria

== Gallery ==
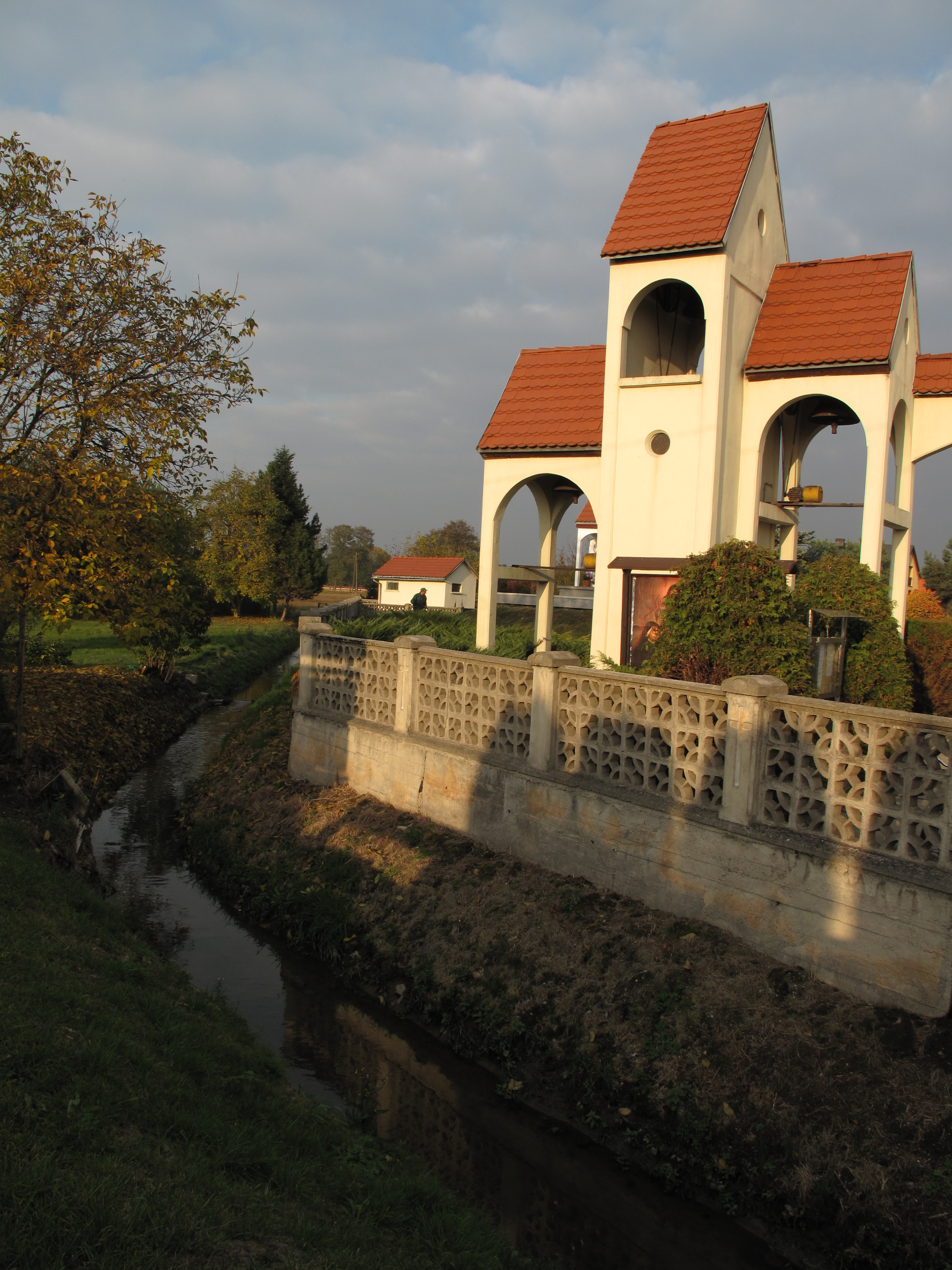
Bell tower in Łąki Kozielskie

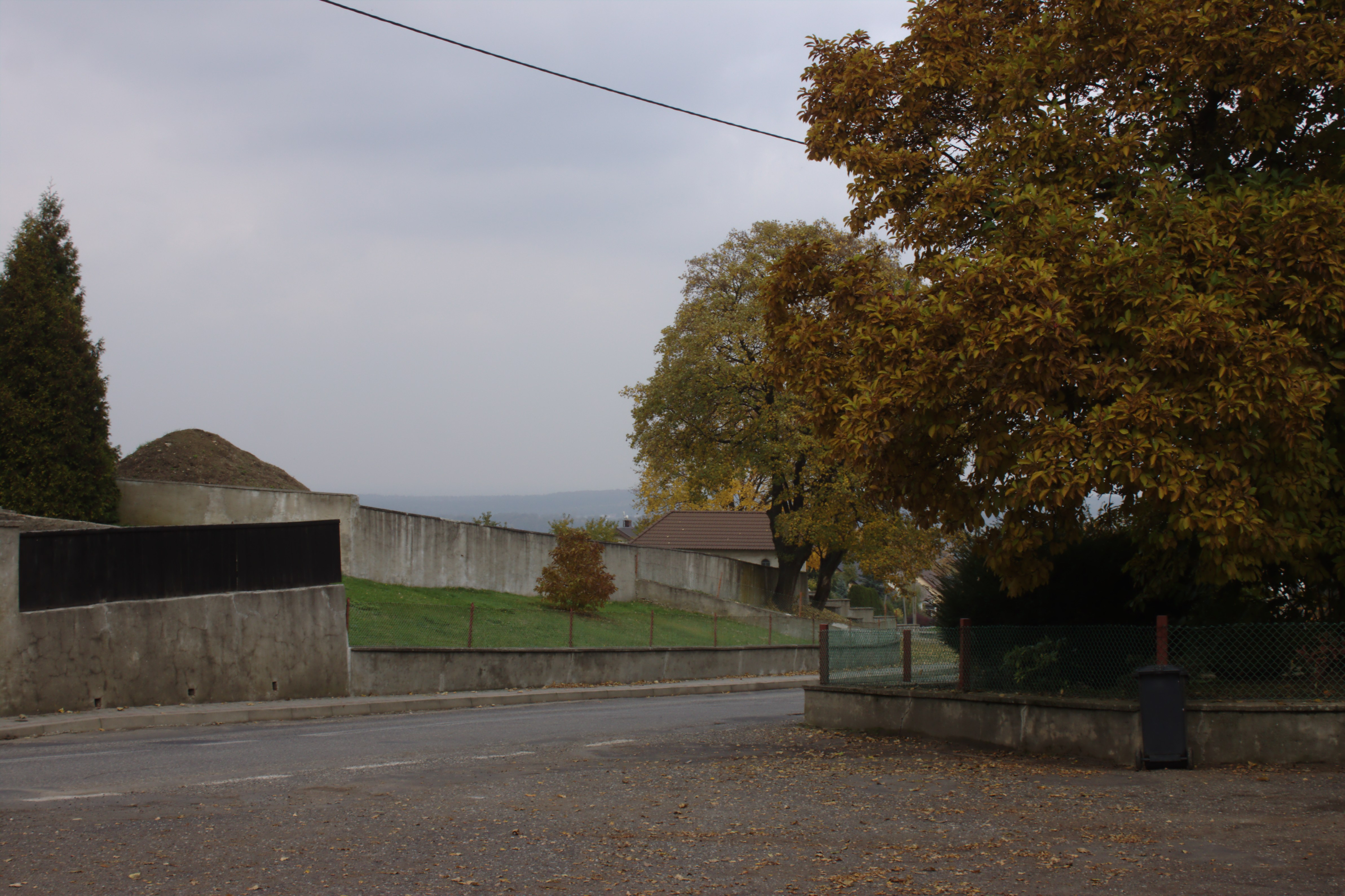
Trees in Wysoka

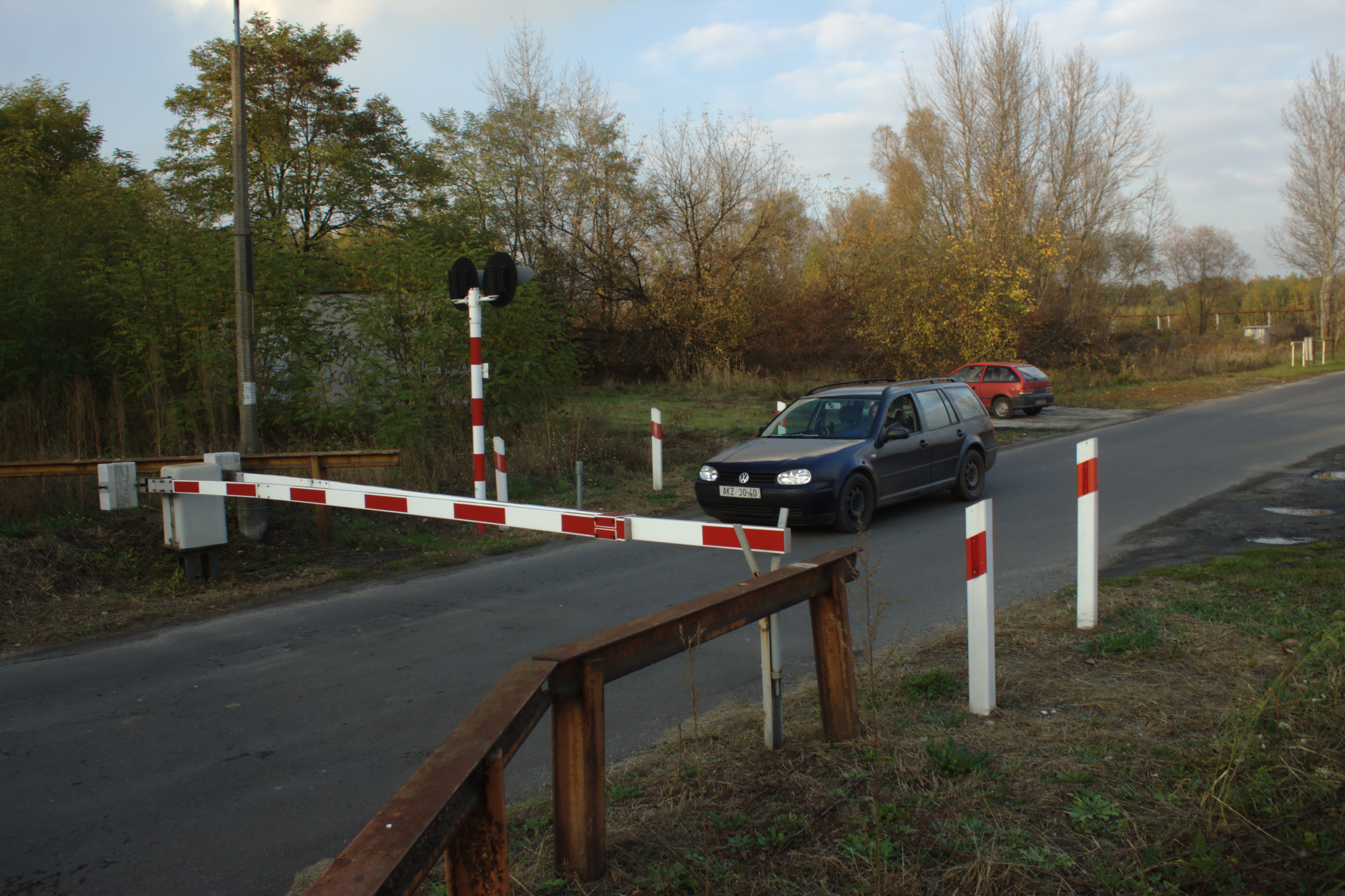
Railroad crossing
