= Krasowa =

Krasowa Krassowa
- Village
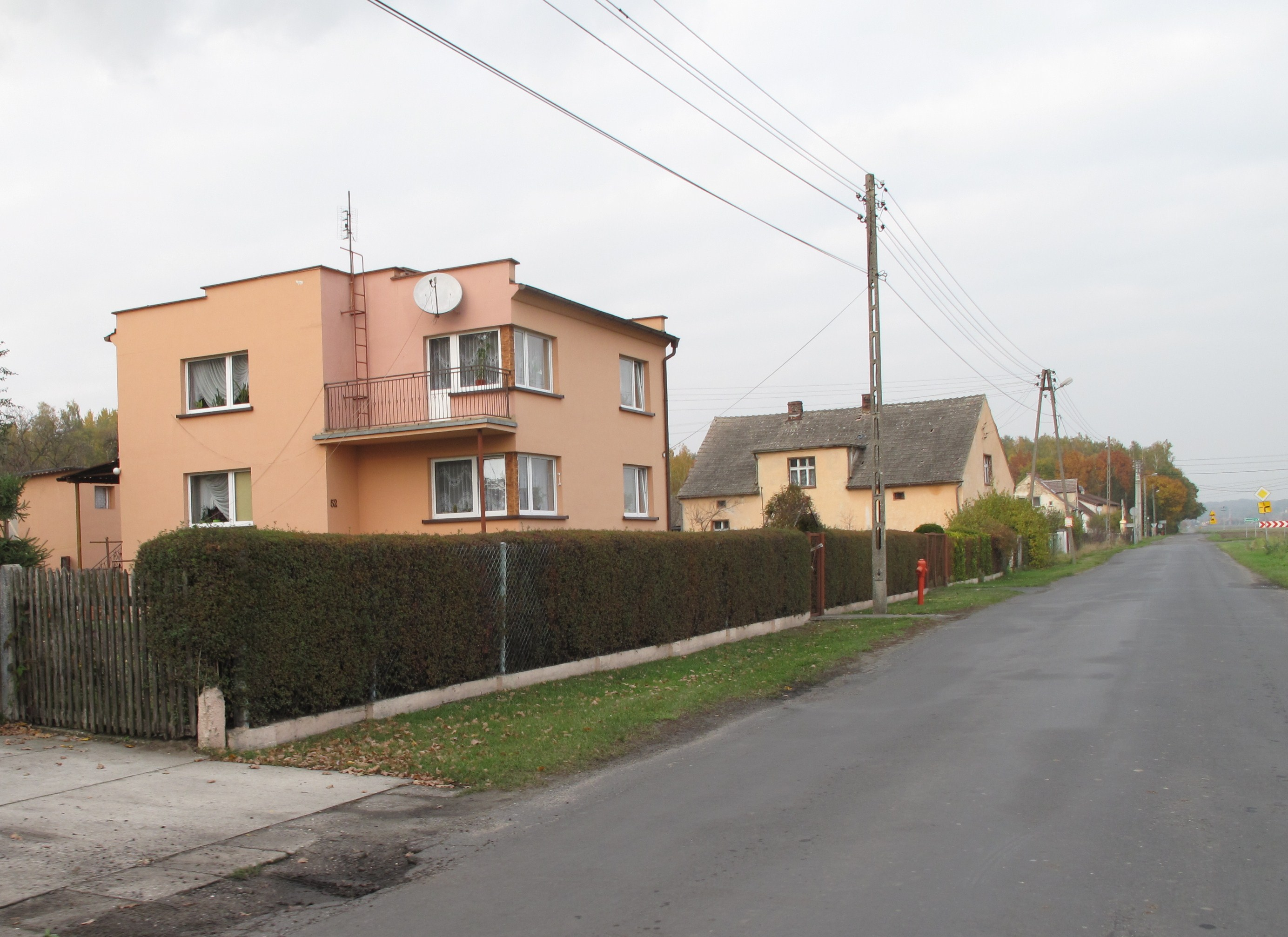
- Street

- Location within Poland
- Coordinates: 50°24′N 18°9′E
- Country: Poland
- Voivodeship: Opole
- County: Strzelce
- Gmina: Leśnica
- Postal code: 47-150

Krasowa ([kraˈsɔva], additional name in German: Krassowa) is a village in the administrative district of Gmina Leśnica, within Strzelce County, Opole Voivodeship, in southern Poland.
