= Zalesie Śląskie =

Zalesie Śląskie Salesche
- Village
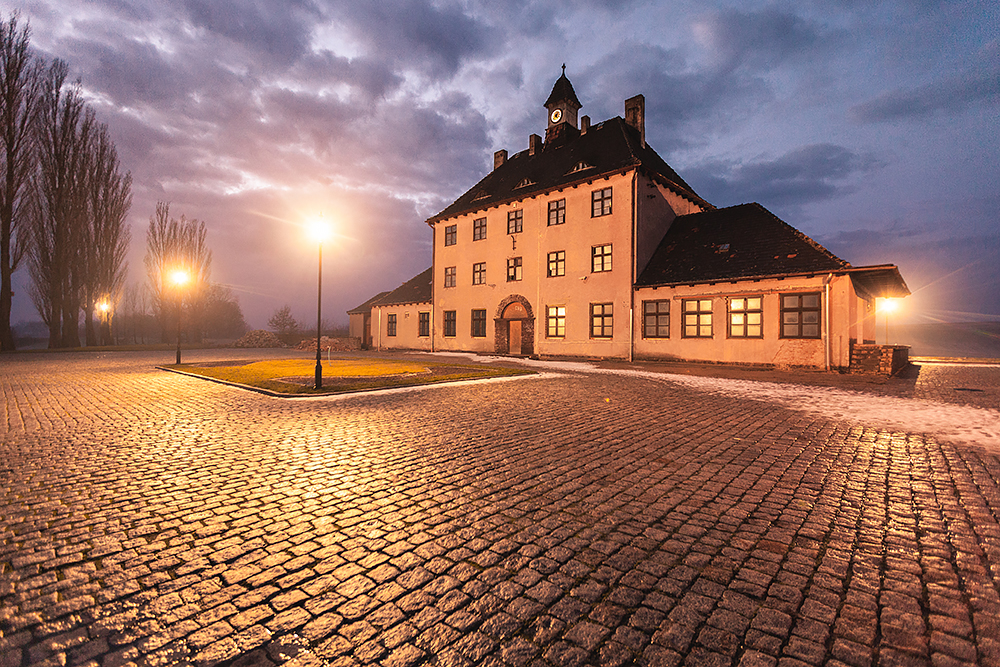
- Railway station in Zalesie Śląskie

- Location within Poland
- Coordinates: 50°25′N 18°16′E
- Country: Poland
- Voivodeship: Opole
- County: Strzelce
- Gmina: Leśnica
- First mentioned: 1223

Population
  - Total: 1,468
- Time zone: UTC+1 (CET)
  - Summer (DST): UTC+2 (CEST)
- Postal code: 47-150
- Vehicle registration: OST
- Website: http://www.zalesieslaskie.pl

Zalesie Śląskie ([zaˈlɛɕɛ ˈɕlɔ̃skʲɛ], additional name in German: Salesche) is a village in the administrative district of Gmina Leśnica, within Strzelce County, Opole Voivodeship, in southern Poland.

Its flower carpets during the Corpus Christi procession is along with other villages listed in the Representative List of the Intangible Cultural Heritage of Humanity maintained by UNESCO.

== History ==
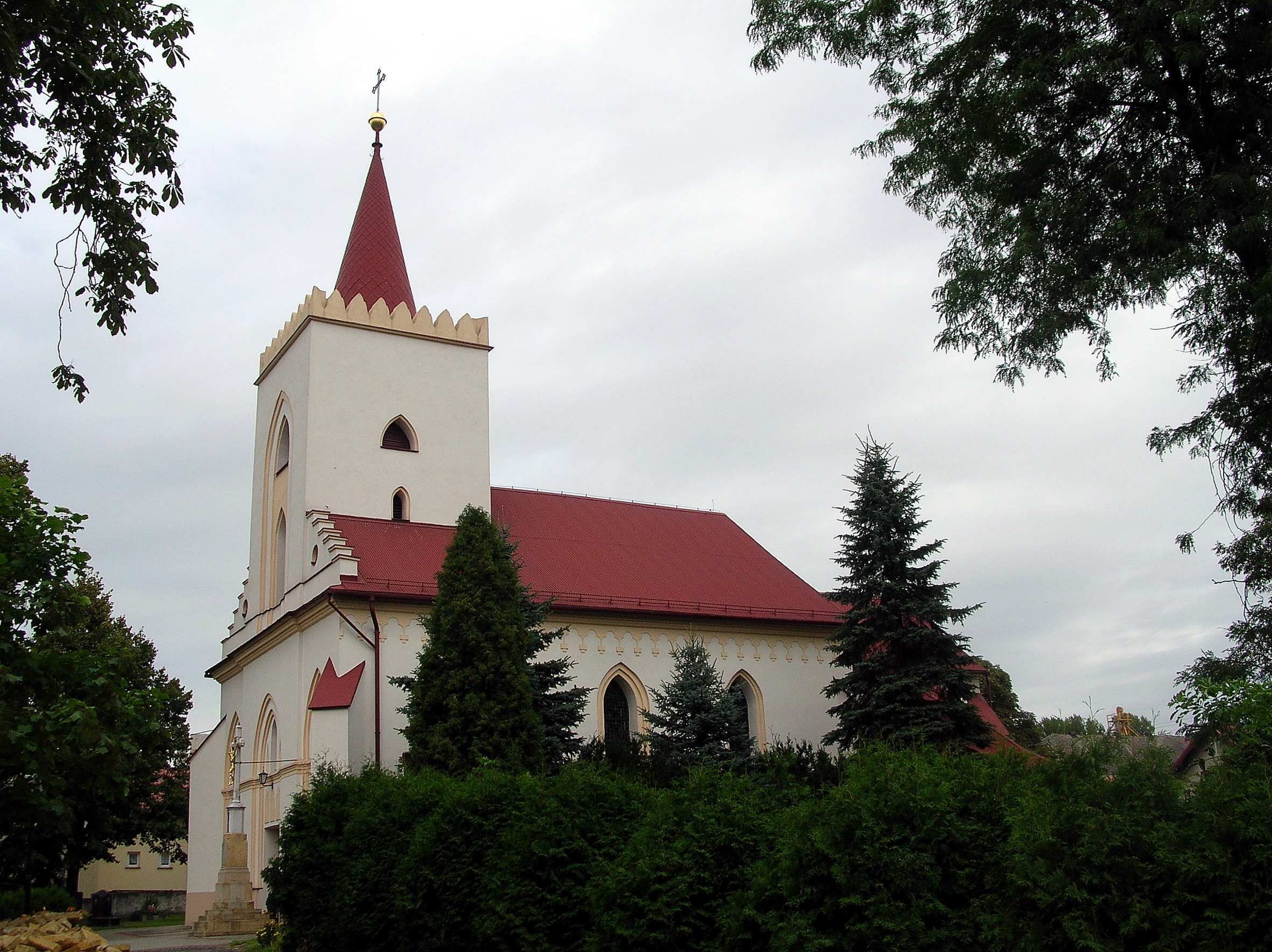
Saint Hedwig church

The village was first mentioned under its Old Polish name Zalese in 1223, when it was part of fragmented Piast-ruled Poland. Its name comes from the Polish word las, which means "forest", and is typical of the area. In the 18th century it was annexed by Kingdom of Prussia, and from 1871 to 1945 it was part of Germany. The Germanized name Salesche appeared in 1845, and in 1935, the German administration renamed the village to Gross Walden to erase traces of Polish origin.

In the final stages of World War II, in May 1945, a group of Polish and Soviet prisoners of war from the German Stalag VIII-A prisoner-of-war camp was liberated in the village by the advancing Soviet troops. Afterwards the village became again part of Poland, and its historic name was restored, with the addition of the adjective Śląskie after the region of Silesia within which it is located, for distinction from other settlements with the same name.
