= Kosorowice =

- Village
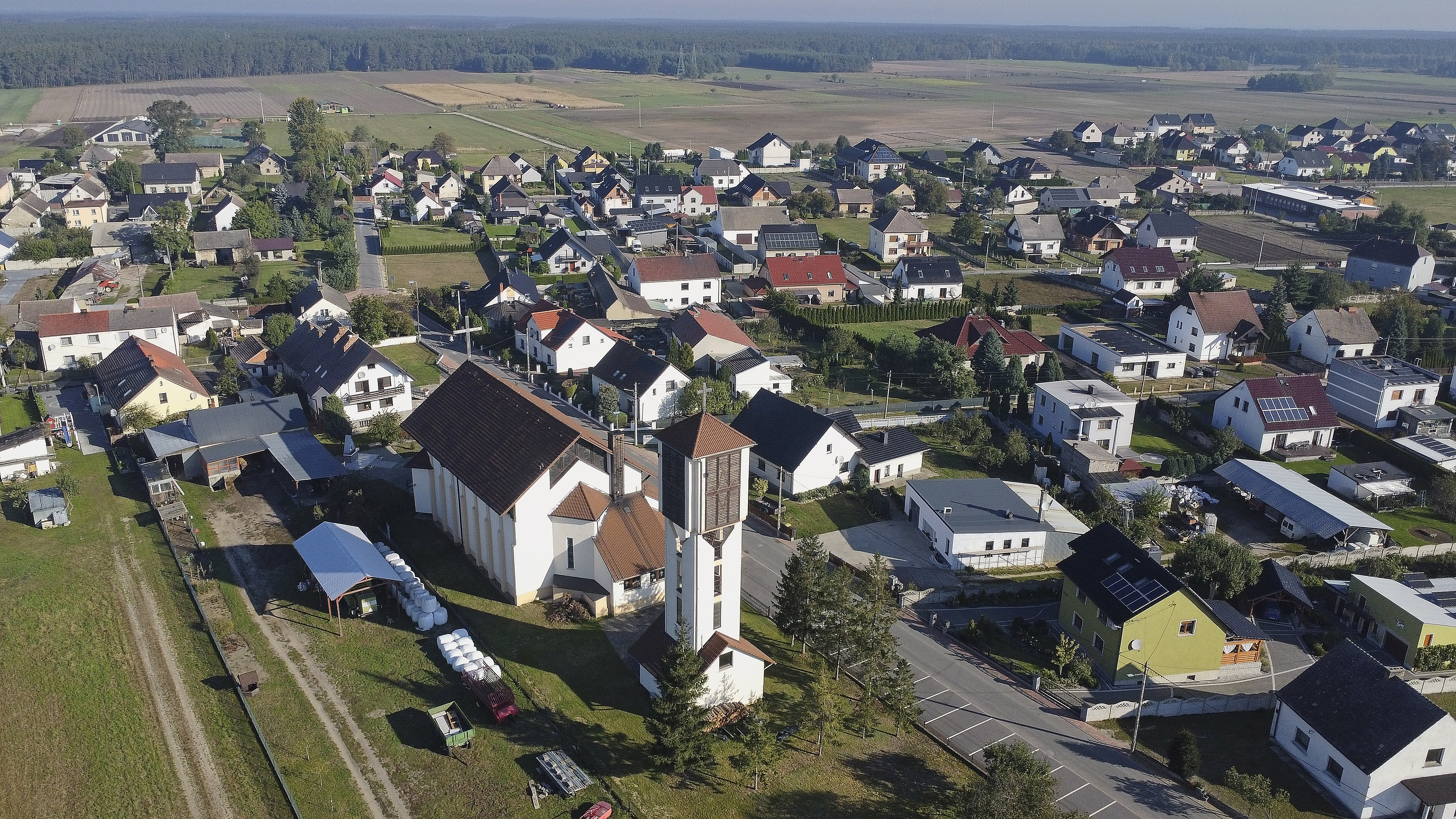

- Location within Poland
- Coordinates: 50°35′N 18°3′E
- Country: Poland
- Voivodeship: Opole
- County: Opole
- Gmina: Tarnów Opolski
- Population (approx.): 800

Kosorowice [kɔsɔrɔˈvit͡sɛ] (German: Kossorowitz) is a village in the administrative district of Gmina Tarnów Opolski, within Opole County, Opole Voivodeship, in south-western Poland.
