= Kadłubiec =

Kadłubiec Kadlubietz
- Village
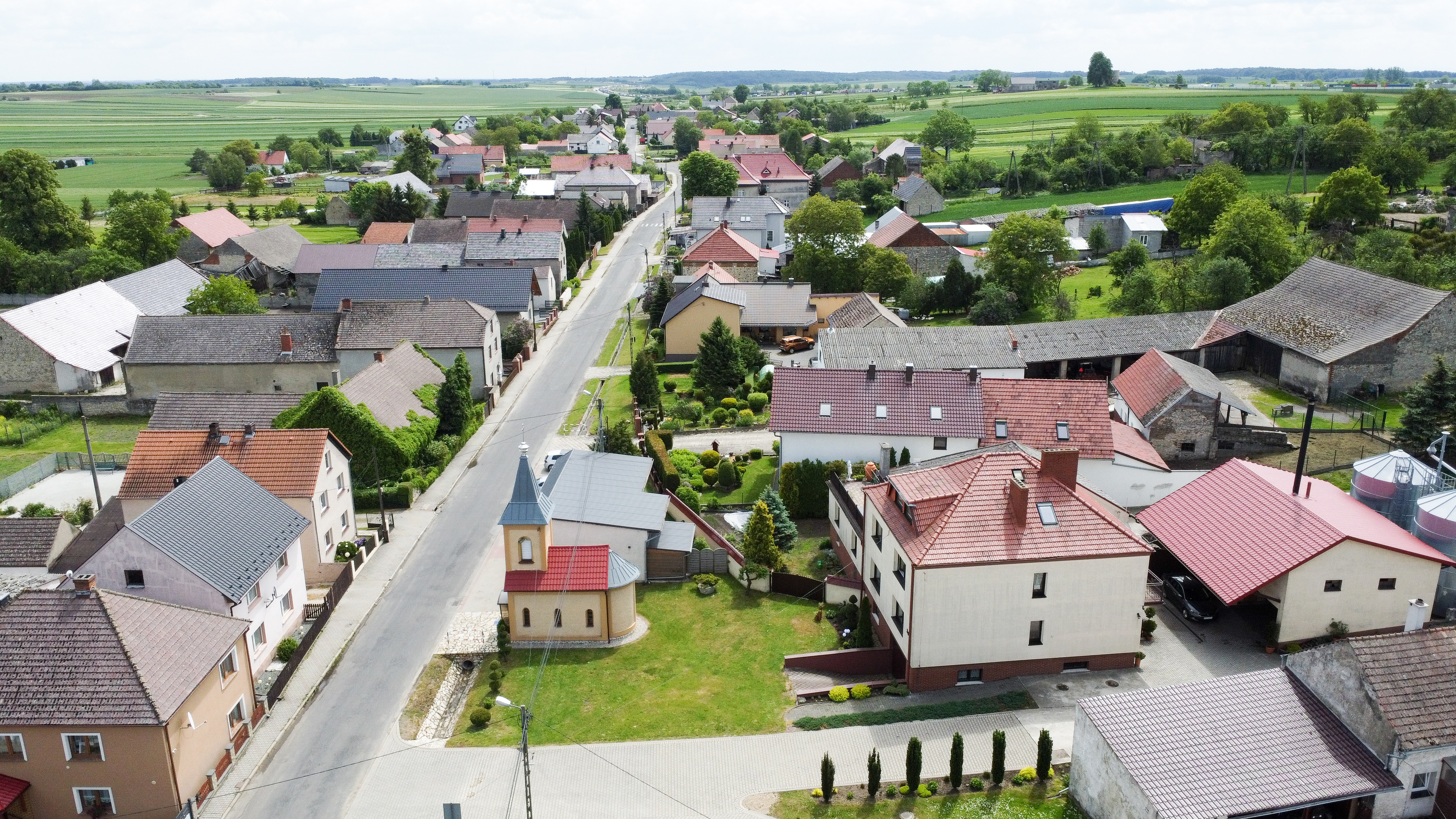

- Location within Poland
- Coordinates: 50°28′N 18°11′E
- Country: Poland
- Voivodeship: Opole
- County: Strzelce
- Gmina: Leśnica
- Postal code: 47-154

Kadłubiec ([kaˈdwubjɛt͡s], additional name in German: Kadlubietz) is a village in the administrative district of Gmina Leśnica, within Strzelce County, Opole Voivodeship, in southern Poland.
