= Łąki Kozielskie =

Łąki Kozielskie Lenkau
- Village
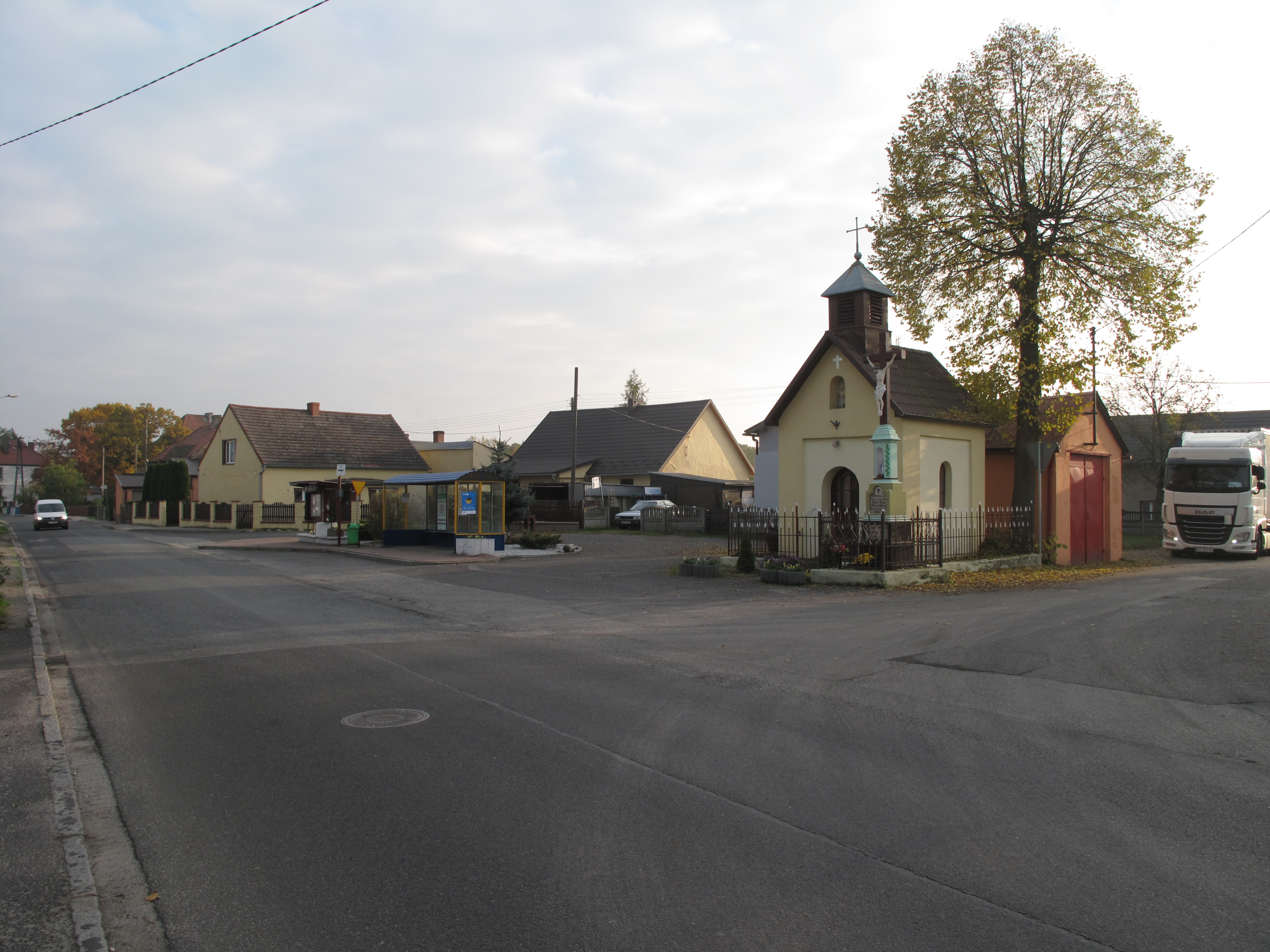
- Village square

- Location within Poland
- Coordinates: 50°24′N 18°12′E
- Country: Poland
- Voivodeship: Opole
- County: Strzelce
- Gmina: Leśnica
- Postal code: 47-150

Łąki Kozielskie (Polish pronunciation: [ˈwɔŋkʲi kɔˈʑɛlskʲɛ], additional name in German: Lenkau) is a village in the administrative district of Gmina Leśnica, within Strzelce County, Opole Voivodeship, in southern Poland.
