= Kąty Opolskie =

- Village
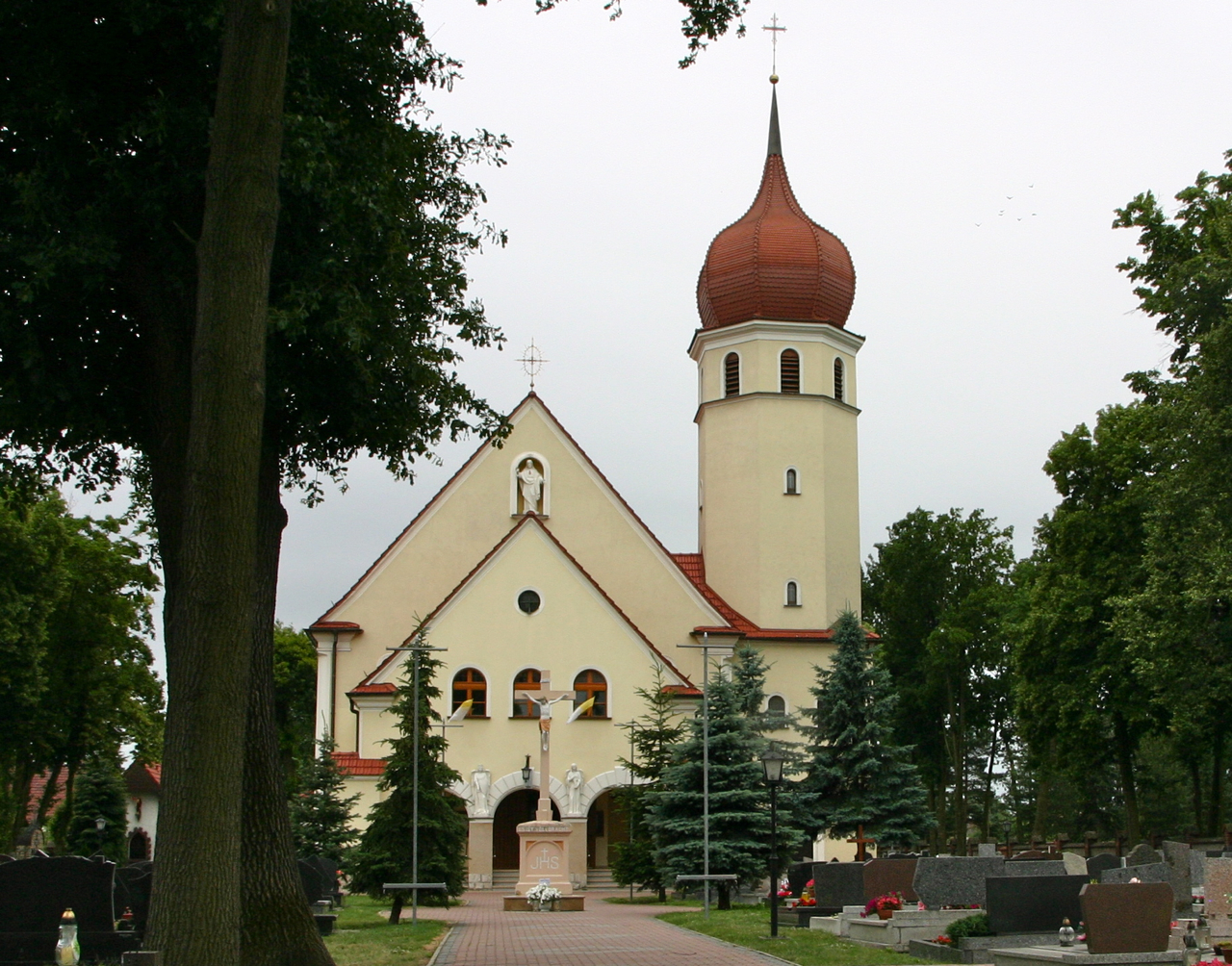
- Church of the Sacred Heart of Jesus

- Location within Poland
- Coordinates: 50°33′N 17°58′E
- Country: Poland
- Voivodeship: Opole
- County: Opole
- Gmina: Tarnów Opolski

Population
  - Total: 952

Kąty Opolskie [ˈkɔntɨ ɔˈpɔlskʲɛ] is a village in the administrative district of Gmina Tarnów Opolski, within Opole County, Opole Voivodeship, in south-western Poland.
