= Gmina Tarnów Opolski =

Gmina Tarnów Opolski Gemeinde Tarnau Tarnów Opolski Commune
- Gmina
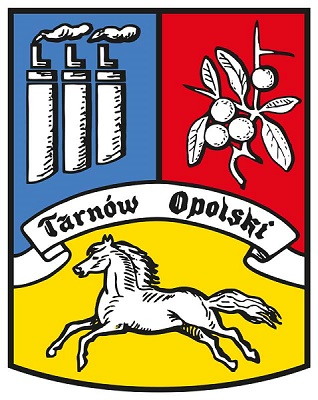
- Flag Coat of arms
- Interactive map of Gmina Tarnów Opolski
- Coordinates (Tarnów Opolski): 50°35′N 18°5′E
- Country: Poland
- Voivodeship: Opole
- County: Opole
- Seat: Tarnów Opolski

Area
  - Total: 81.6 km^{2} (31.5 sq mi)

Population (2019-06-30)
  - Total: 9,580
  - Density: 117/km^{2} (304/sq mi)
- Time zone: UTC+1 (CET)
  - Summer (DST): UTC+2 (CEST)
- Postal code: 46-050
- Vehicle registration: OPO
- Website: http://www.tarnowopolski.pl

Gmina Tarnów Opolski (German: Gemeinde Tarnau) is a rural gmina (administrative district) in Opole County, Opole Voivodeship, in south-western Poland. Its seat is the village of Tarnów Opolski, which lies approximately 15 kilometres (9 mi) south-east of the regional capital Opole.

The gmina covers an area of 81.6 square kilometres (31.5 sq mi), and as of 2019, its total population was 9,580. Since 2007, the commune, like much of the area, has been officially bilingual in Polish and German, as a large German population remained in the area after it was transferred to Polish control following World War II.

== Administrative divisions ==
The commune contains the villages and settlements of Tarnów Opolski, Kąty Opolskie, Kosorowice, Miedziana, Nakło, Przywory, Raszowa and Walidrogi.

== Neighbouring gminas ==
Gmina Tarnów Opolski is bordered by the city of Opole and by the gminas of Chrząstowice, Gogolin, Izbicko and Prószków.

== Twin towns – sister cities ==
Gmina Tarnów Opolski is twinned with:

- Bad Blankenburg, Germany
- Brück, Germany
