= Popice, Poland =

Popice
- Village
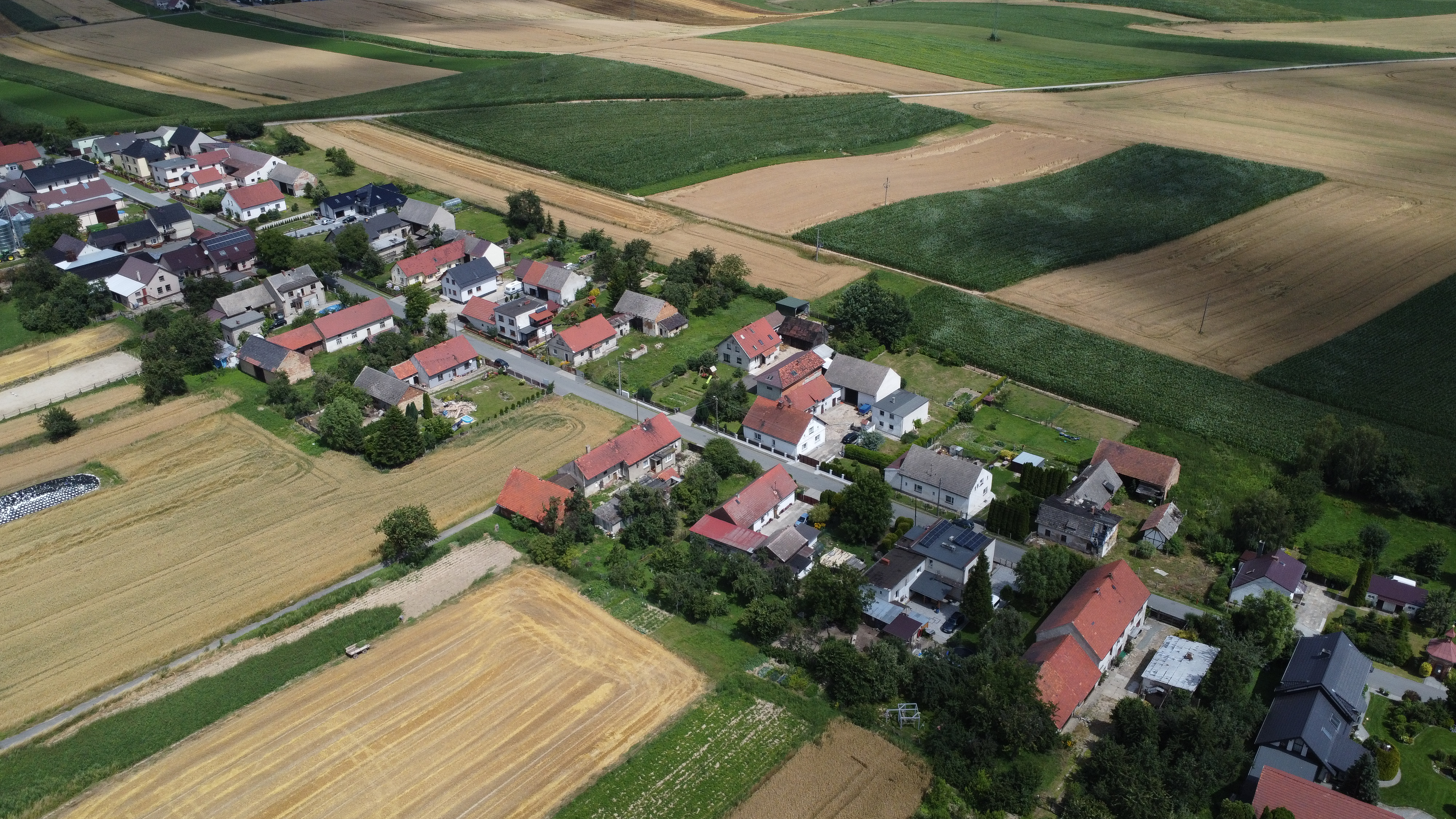

- Location within Poland
- Coordinates: 50°25′49″N 18°16′8″E
- Country: Poland
- Voivodeship: Opole
- County: Strzelce
- Gmina: Leśnica

Popice [pɔˈpit͡sɛ] (German: Poppitz) is a village in the administrative district of Gmina Leśnica, within Strzelce County, Opole Voivodeship, in south-western Poland.
