= Oppolzer =

Oppolzer is a surname of Austrian origin. Most people with the surname Oppolzer have their ancestors in a small region in Southern Bohemia, which was Austrian in former times, but belongs to the Czech Republic today. There is also a small village with an old fort called Oppolz (Czech name Tycha) in this region.

Famous Oppolzers are

- Johann Ritter von Oppolzer, Austrian physician, father of Theodor, born in Nove Hrady, Southern Bohemia
- Theodor von Oppolzer, Austrian astronomer, born in Prague

Both Johann and Theodor lived and worked in Vienna most of the time of their lives.

There is a lunar crater called Oppolzer, and an asteroid. Both are named after Theodor.
