= Raszowa, Gmina Tarnów Opolski =

Raszowa
- Village
- Coat of arms

- Location within Poland
- Coordinates: 50°35′55″N 18°7′50″E
- Country: Poland
- Voivodeship: Opole
- County: Opole
- Gmina: Tarnów Opolski
- Time zone: UTC+1 (CET)
  - Summer (DST): UTC+2 (CEST)
- Vehicle registration: OPO

Raszowa [raˈʂɔva] (German: Raschau) is a village in the administrative district of Gmina Tarnów Opolski, within Opole County, Opole Voivodeship, in southern Poland.

The name of the village is of Polish origin and comes from the word raszka, which means "robin".

The village has a significant German minority and has been officially bilingual (Polish and German) since 2007.
