= Kupperberg =

Kupperberg is a surname. Notable people with the surname include:

- Alan Kupperberg (1953–2015), American comics artist and writer
- Paul Kupperberg (born 1955), American comics writer and editor, brother of Alan

== See also ==
- Kupferberg (disambiguation)
