= Granice, Bosnia and Herzegovina =

Granice
- Village
- Location within Bosnia and Herzegovina
- Coordinates: 44.1251181°N 17.8594991°E
- Country: Bosnia and Herzegovina
- Entity: Federation of Bosnia and Herzegovina
- Canton: Central Bosnia
- Municipality: Busovača

Area
  - Total: 0.88 sq mi (2.29 km^{2})

Population (2013)
  - Total: 126
  - Density: 143/sq mi (55.0/km^{2})
- Time zone: UTC+1 (CET)
  - Summer (DST): UTC+2 (CEST)

Granice is a village in the municipality of Busovača, Bosnia and Herzegovina.

== Demographics ==
According to the 2013 census, its population was 126.

Ethnicity in 2013
Ethnicity	Number	Percentage
Croats	103	81.7%
Bosniaks	9	7.1%
Serbs	14	11.1%
Total	126	100%
