= Granica, Opole Voivodeship =

Granica
- Village
- Location within Poland
- Coordinates: 50°26′2″N 18°14′34″E
- Country: Poland
- Voivodeship: Opole
- County: Strzelce
- Gmina: Leśnica

Granica [ɡraˈnit͡sa] (German: Grenzhäuser) is a village in the administrative district of Gmina Leśnica, within Strzelce County, Opole Voivodeship, in south-western Poland.
