= Miedziana, Opole Voivodeship =

Miedziana
- Village
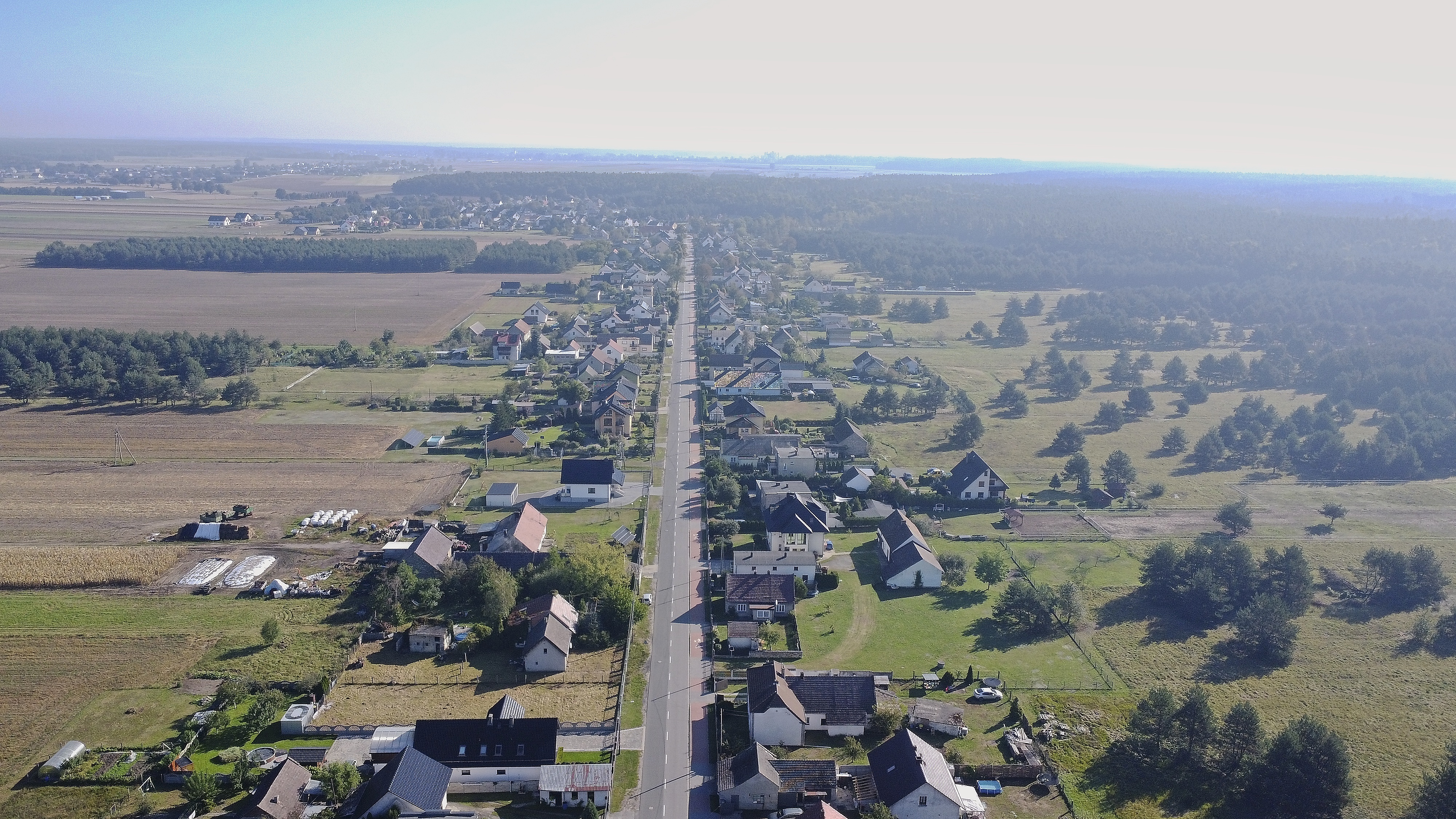

- Location within Poland
- Coordinates: 50°33′N 18°1′E
- Country: Poland
- Voivodeship: Opole
- County: Opole
- Gmina: Tarnów Opolski

Miedziana [mjɛˈd͡ʑana] is a village in the administrative district of Gmina Tarnów Opolski, within Opole County, Opole Voivodeship, in south-western Poland.
