= Dolna, Strzelce County =

Dolna Dollna
- Village
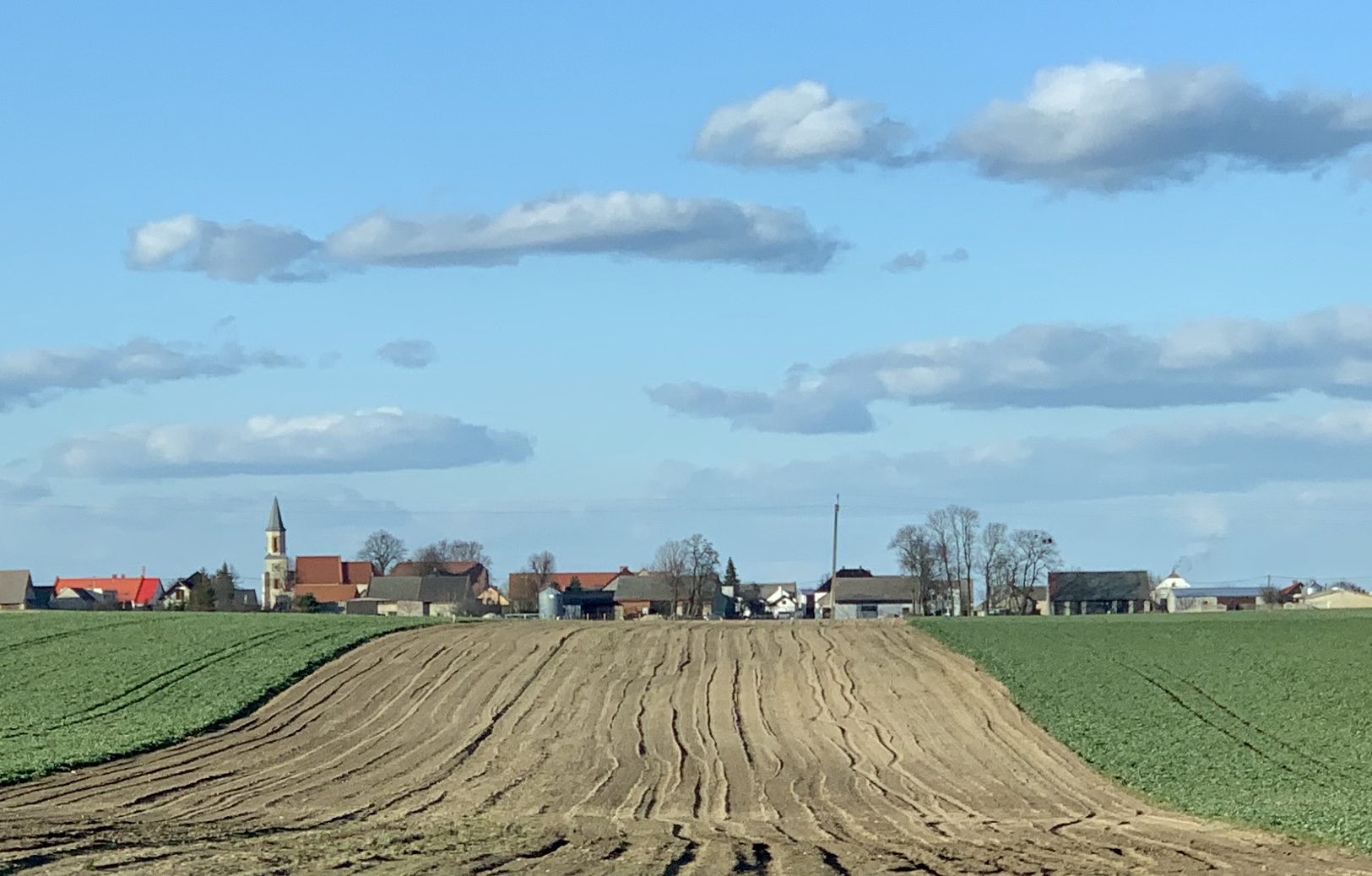

- Location within Poland
- Coordinates: 50°28′N 18°14′E
- Country: Poland
- Voivodeship: Opole
- County: Strzelce
- Gmina: Leśnica
- Time zone: UTC+1 (CET)
  - Summer (DST): UTC+2 (CEST)
- Postal code: 47-100

Dolna ([ˈdɔlna], additional name in German: Dollna) is a village in the administrative district of Gmina Leśnica, within Strzelce County, Opole Voivodeship, in southern Poland.

== History ==
The oldest known mention of the village comes from 1302, when it was part of fragmented Piast-ruled Poland. From 1871 to 1945 it was part of Germany. In 1936, during a massive campaign of renaming of placenames, the Nazis changed its name to Niederkirch to remove traces of Polish origin, and from 1940 to 1943 they operated a forced labour camp for Jews in the village.

== Sights ==
There is a Gothic church of Saints Peter and Paul and a mass grave of Polish insurgents from 1921 in the village.
