= Powiat opolski =

Powiat opolski may refer to either of two counties (powiats) in Poland:

- Opole County, Opole Voivodeship (SW Poland)
- Opole County, Lublin Voivodeship (E Poland)
