= Granitsa, Kyustendil Province =

Granitsa Граница
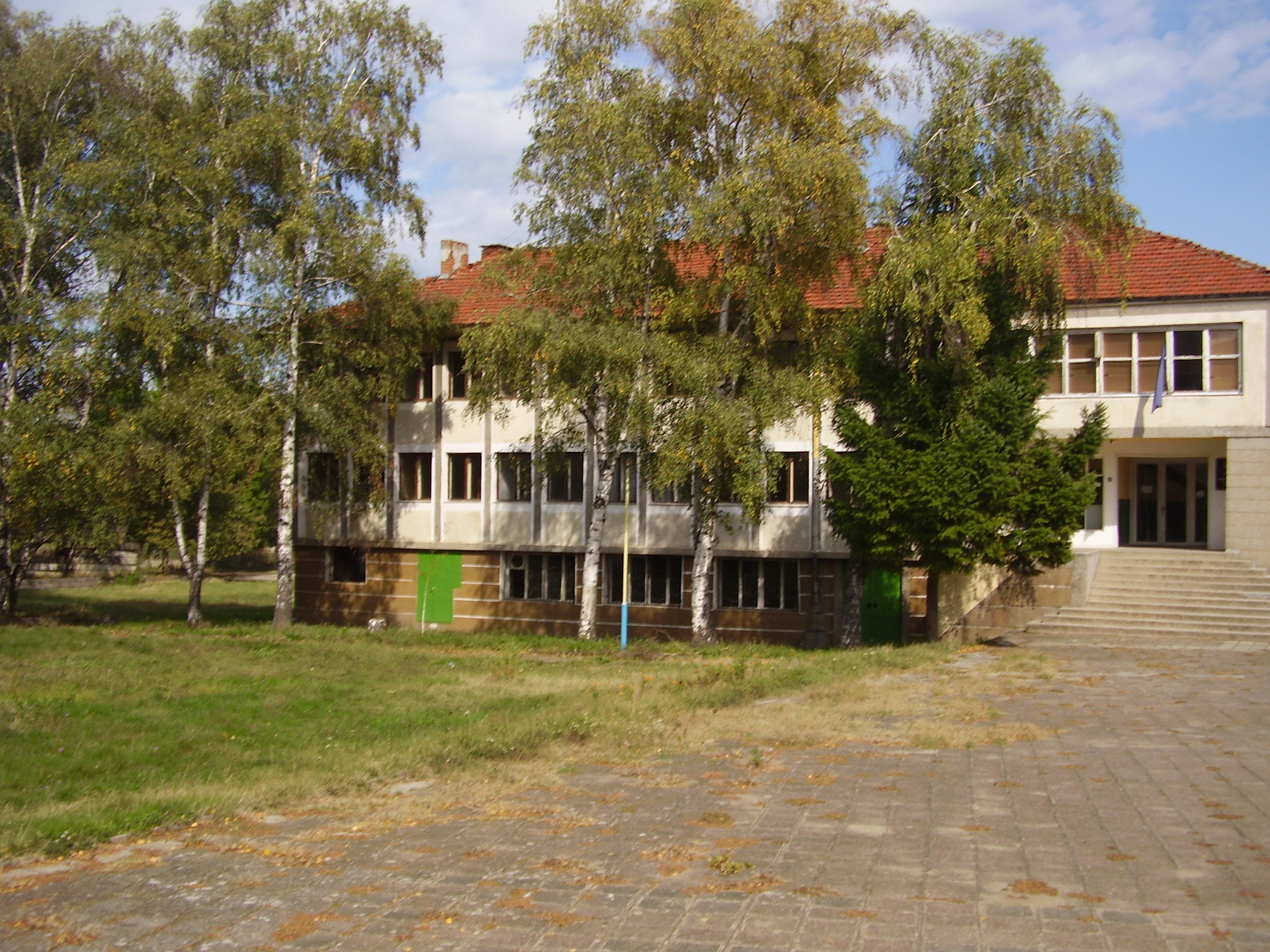
- The mayor's office

- Location of Granitsa
- Coordinates: 42°15′N 22°44′E
- Country: Bulgaria
- Province (Oblast): Kyustendil

Government
  - Mayor: Kamen Shukerov
- Elevation: 584 m (1,916 ft)

Population (2008)
  - Total: 567
- Time zone: UTC+2 (EET)
  - Summer (DST): UTC+3 (EEST)
- Postal Code: 2589
- Area code: 07911

Granitsa (Bulgarian: Граница, pronounced [ɡrɐˈnit͡sɐ]; also transliterated Granica or Granitza) is a village in southwestern Bulgaria, part of Kyustendil Municipality, Kyustendil Province.

Granitsa lies in a hilly valley in the eastern Osogovo mountains. It is bisected by a ravine, the bed of a rivulet which goes almost dry in the summer and autumn. Granitsa includes several neighbourhoods: Yakimova, Dzhoneva, Gorchovska, Efendiyska and Antova. The village was first mentioned in Vladislav the Grammarian's account of 1448:. At the time, the sons of the local Bulgarian noble (bolyarin) and later monk Jacob (Yakov) from Krupnik settled in Saint Luke's Monastery above Granitsa. The three brothers Joasaph (Yoasaf), David and Theophanes (Teofan) reconstructed the deserted and plundered Rila Monastery in 1453–1466. In 1469, they initiated the return of Saint John of Rila's remains from Veliko Tarnovo to the monastery. The village's name is derived from the dialectal word granítsa, "a sort of branched oak", from the Bulgarian word granka, "offshoot, offset".

Granitsa was also mentioned in Ottoman tax registers of 1576 as Graniçe. In the 19th century, most of the land in the village was the property of Turkish (Liman Ağa, Daut Beg) and Jewish (Sari Bohor) farm owners from Kyustendil. Landmarks in and around the village include the Bulgarian National Revival-time Church of Saint Elijah (1856–1857) and the residential defensive tower known as the Granitski House (1856), both built by Master Milenko. The Granitsa Monastery of Saint Luke lies to the southwest and may date to the 10th century; reconstructed in 1948, it is a fully active Bulgarian Orthodox monastery. Also southwest of Granitsa are the ruins of the eponymous medieval fortress from the Second Bulgarian Empire, probably a defensive station on the Velbazhd-Štip road. Another landmark is the Venerable Beech Forest, a protected area established in 1995 and covering 1.30 hectares (13,000 m^{2}).

== Gallery ==
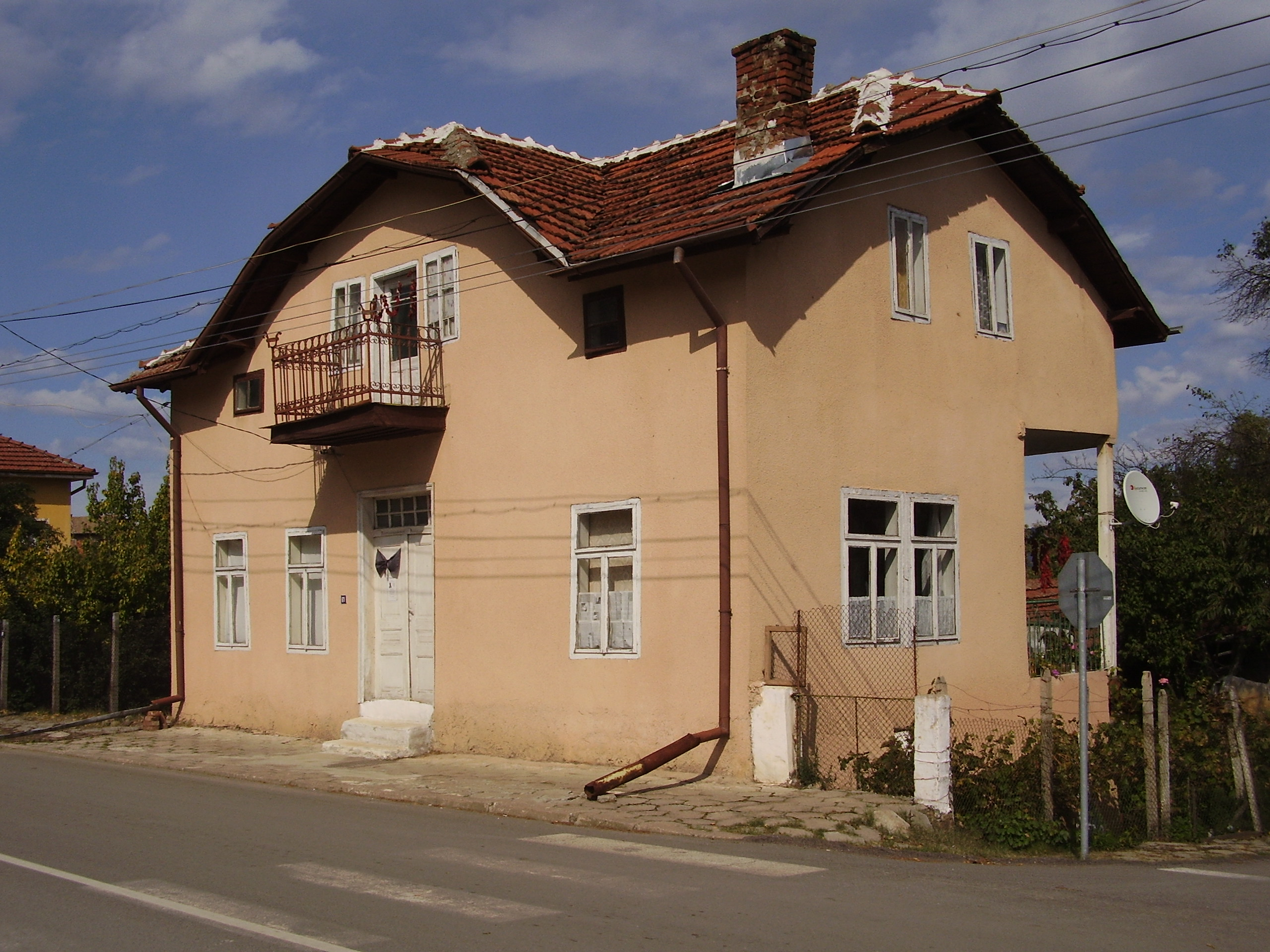
Typical house in the village centre

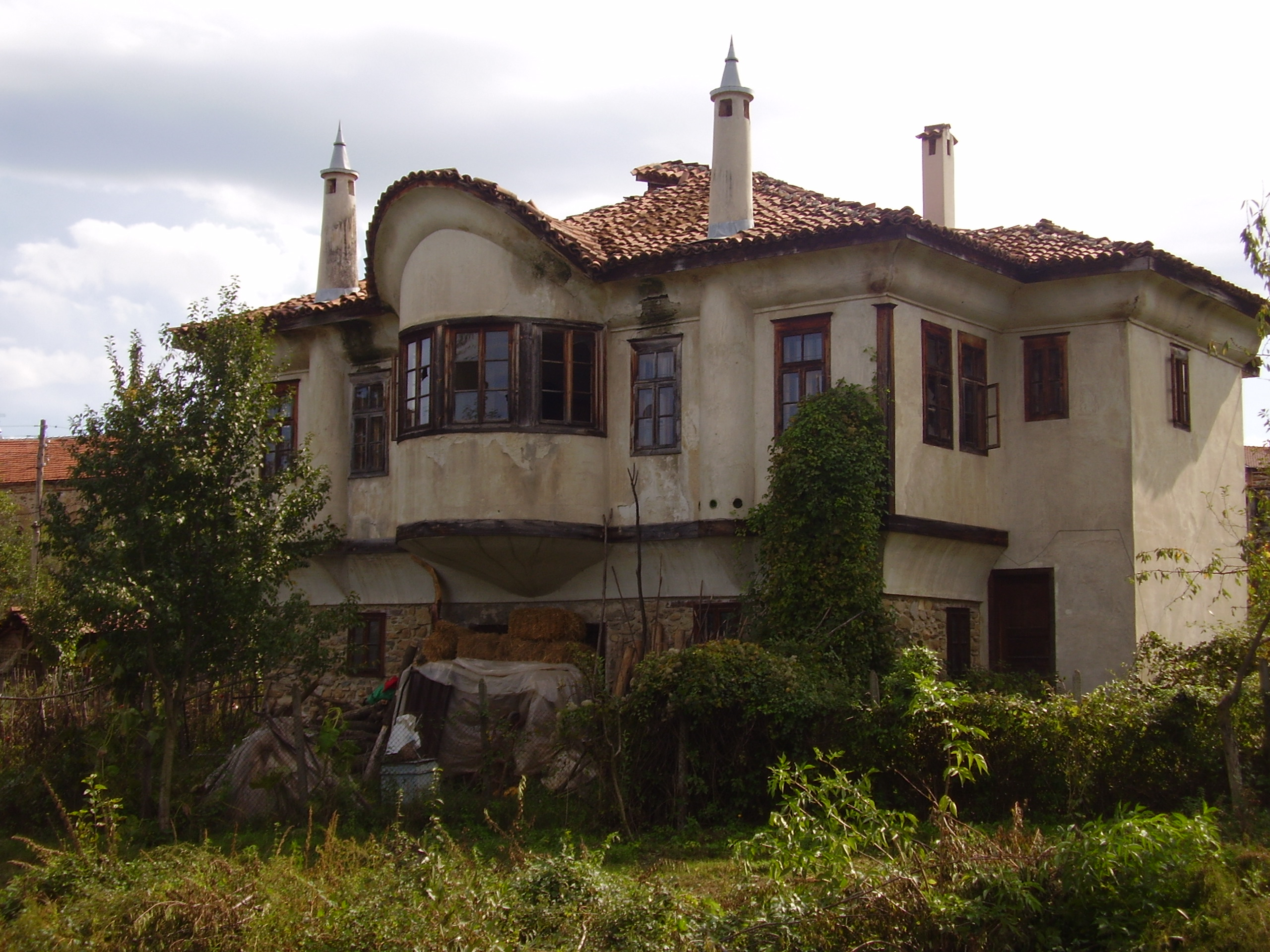
Granitski House or Tower (1856)

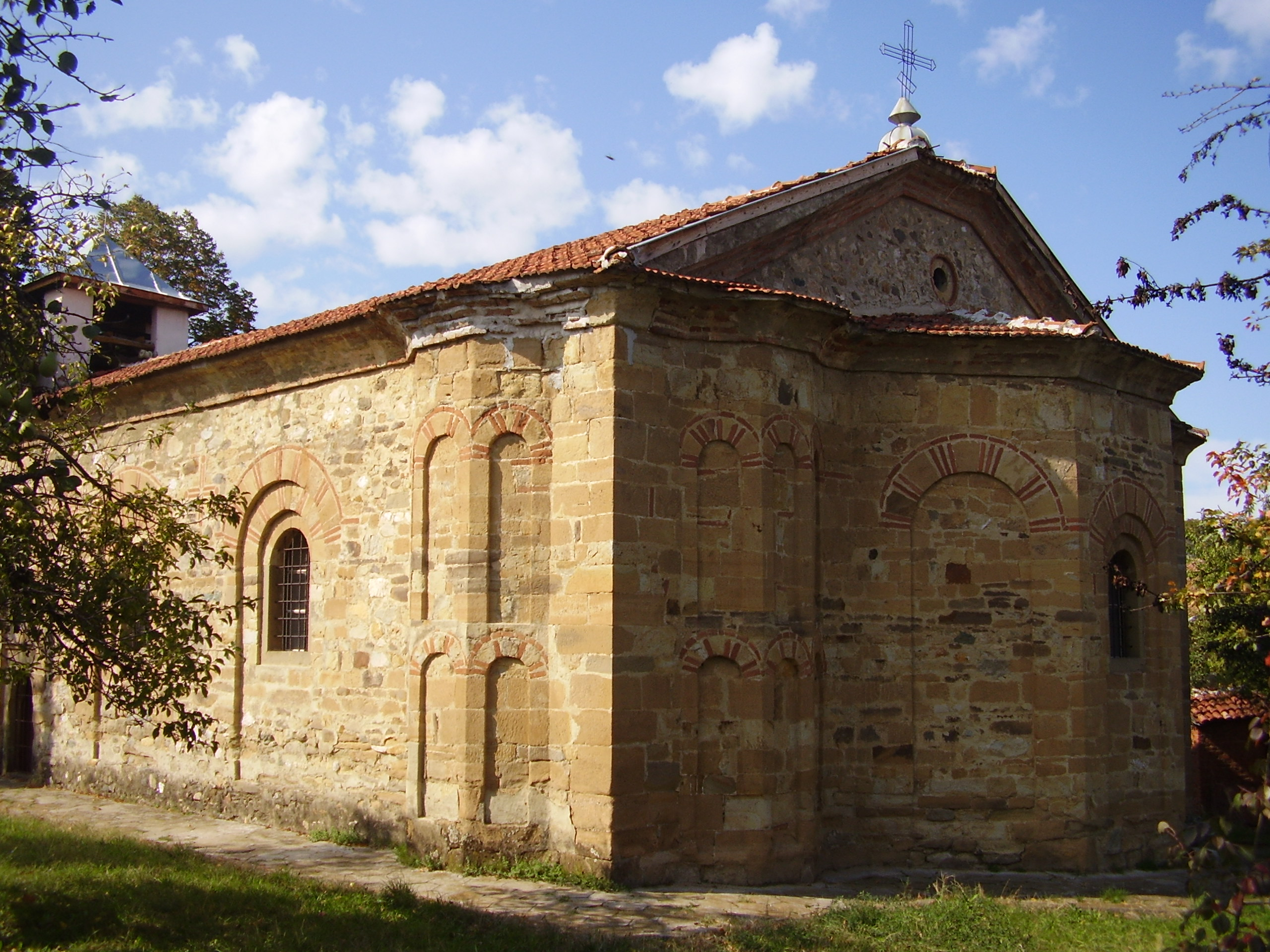
Church of Saint Elijah (1856–1857)

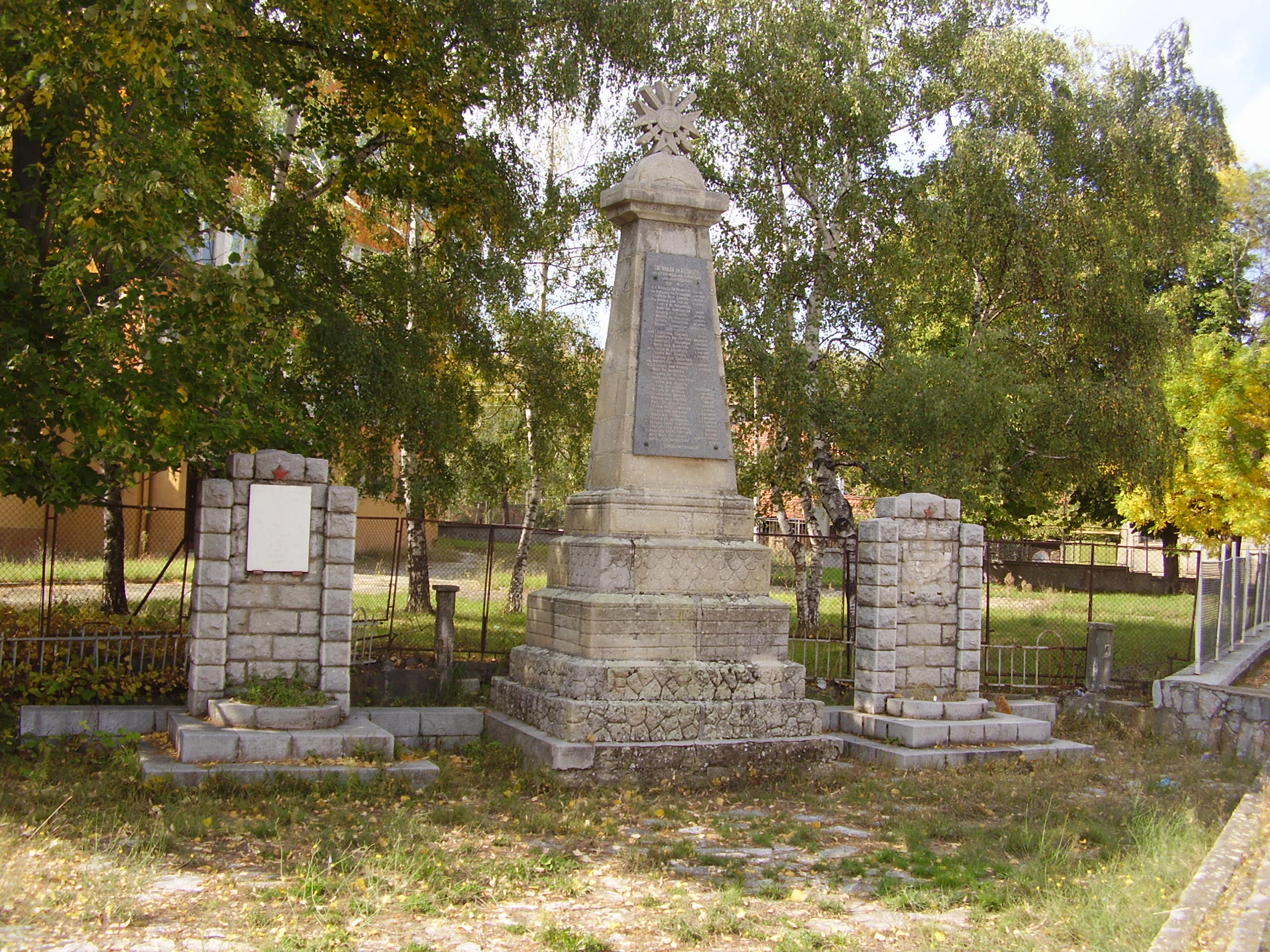
Monuments to the war victims
