= Raszowa, Strzelce County =

Raszowa Raschowa
- Village
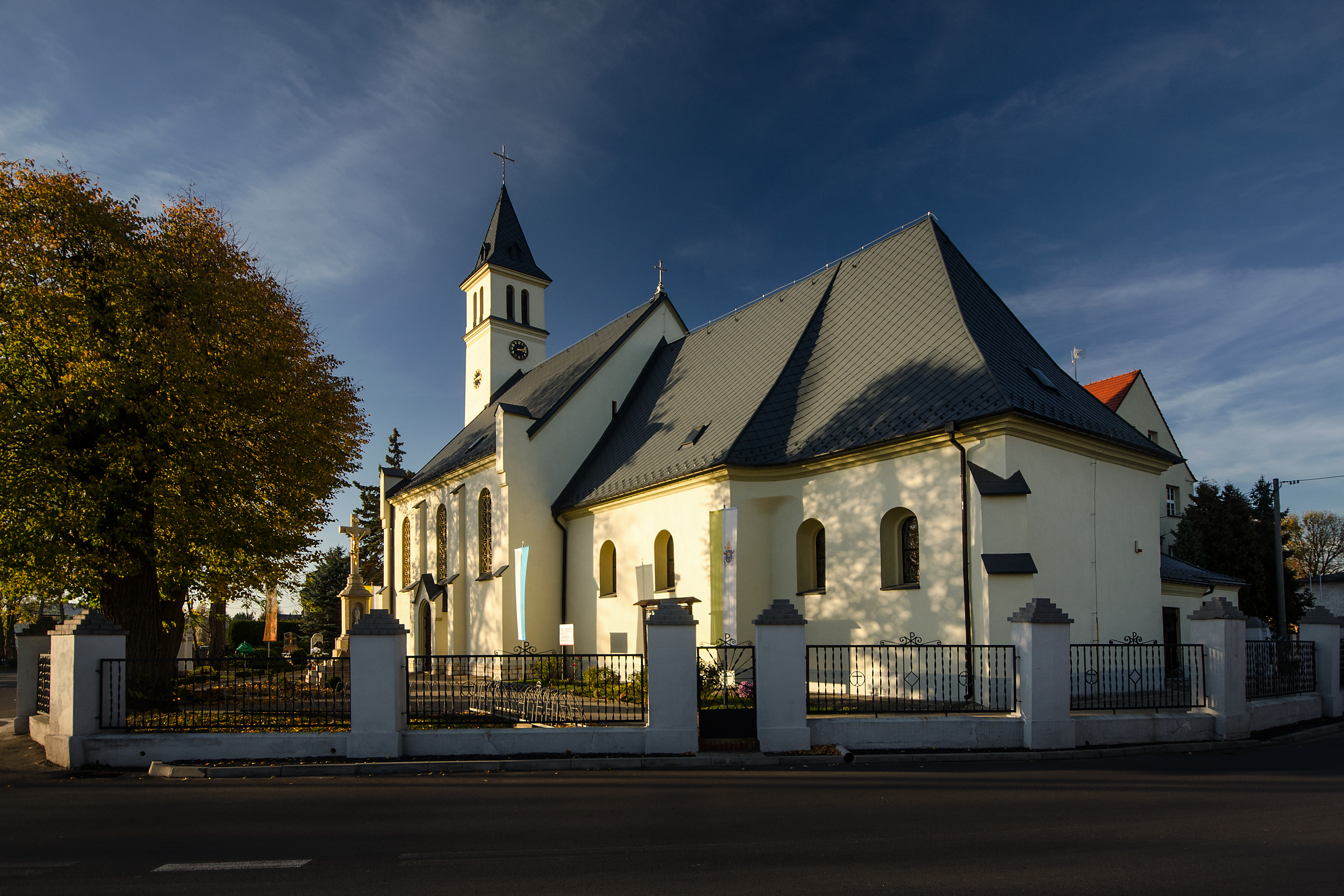
- All Saints church in Raszowa

- Location within Poland
- Coordinates: 50°23′N 18°10′E
- Country: Poland
- Voivodeship: Opole
- County: Strzelce
- Gmina: Leśnica
- Postal code: 47-150

Raszowa ([raˈʂɔva], additional name in German: Raschowa) is a village in the administrative district of Gmina Leśnica, within Strzelce County, Opole Voivodeship, in southern Poland.
