= Tarnów Opolski =

- Village
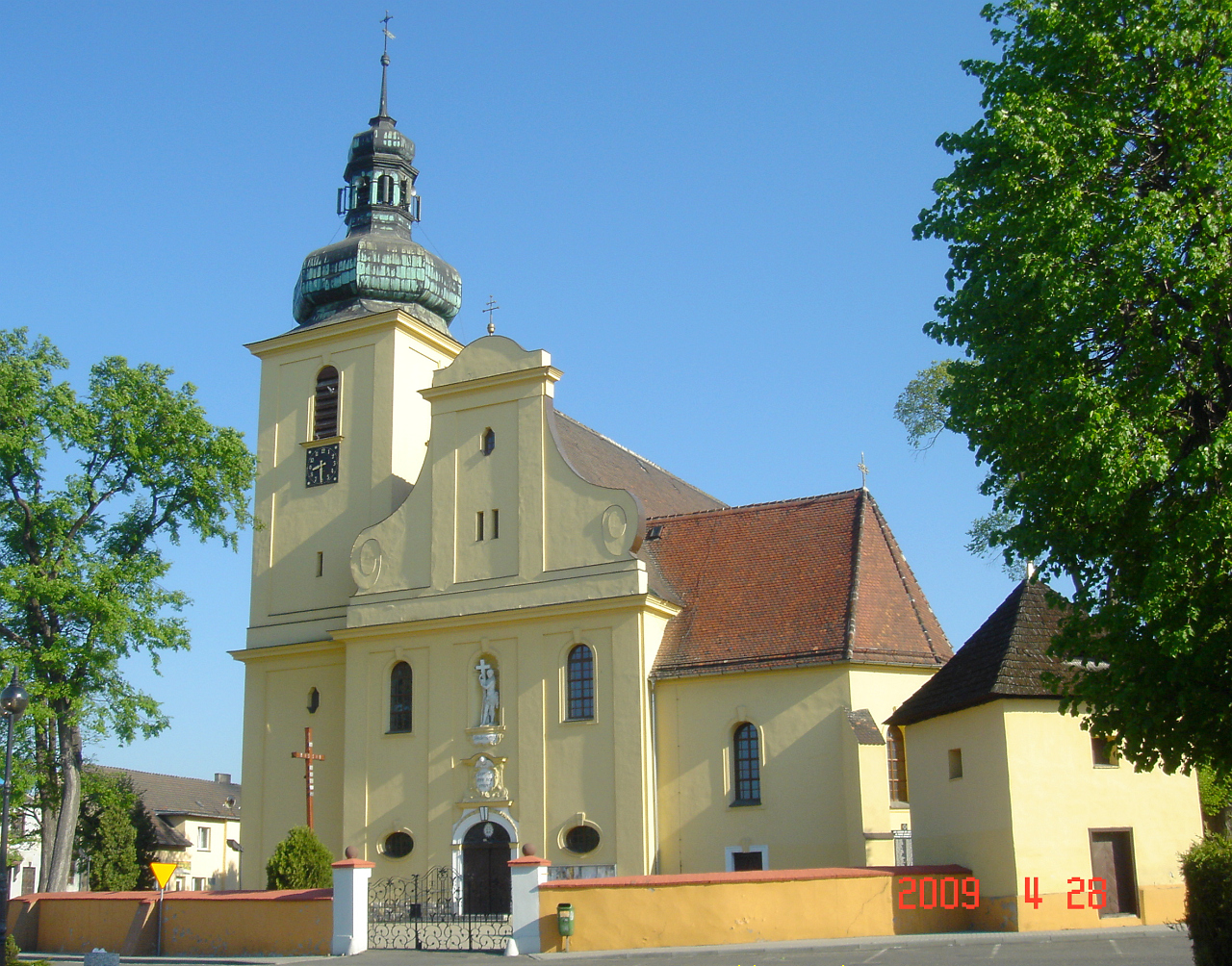
- Church of Saint Martin

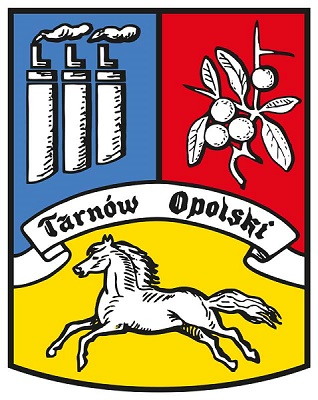
- Coat of arms

- Location within Poland
- Coordinates: 50°35′N 18°5′E
- Country: Poland
- Voivodeship: Opole
- County: Opole
- Gmina: Tarnów Opolski
- First mentioned: 1293

Population
  - Total: 3,800
- Time zone: UTC+1 (CET)
  - Summer (DST): UTC+2 (CEST)
- Vehicle registration: OPO
- Website: http://www.tarnowopolski.pl

Tarnów Opolski [ˈtarnuf ɔˈpɔlski] is a village in Opole County, Opole Voivodeship, in southern Poland. It is the seat of the gmina (administrative district) called Gmina Tarnów Opolski.

== Name ==
The name Tarnów probably comes from the Old Polish word tarnina, which means "blackthorn", or from tarnie which defines a place where this plant grows. Originally it was called Tarnów Wielki ("Great Tarnów") to distinguish it from the nearby town of Tarnowiec.

Polish Tarnów and the Germanized name Tarnau were listed in 1896 by writer Konstanty Damrot in a book about the names of places in Silesia. Damrot in his book also mentions the Latinized name Tarnov taken from the Latin documents from the years 1335 and 1369. Geographical Dictionary of the Polish Kingdom released at the end of the nineteenth century, given the Polish name of Tarnów Polski and German name Polnisch Tarnau.

Today the name is Tarnów Opolski to distinguish it from other places in Poland with that name.

== History ==
The village was first mentioned in 1293, when it was part of fragmented Piast-ruled Poland. Later on, it was also part of Bohemia (Czechia), Prussia, and Germany. During World War II, the Germans operated the E100 forced labour subcamp of the Stalag VIII-B/344 prisoner-of-war camp in the village. After Germany's defeat in the war, in 1945, the village became again part of Poland.

== Heritage ==
According to the Register of the National Institute of Heritage sites inscribed on the list is: the parish church of St. Martin, whose origins date back to the first half of the fifteenth century; in the seventeenth century the nave and the tower were built, and the church was further expanded in 1853–1864 and 1913. It has a Baroque altar with statues of saints Michael, Joseph and Hedwig, and a Roccoco baptismal font from the second half of the eighteenth century. There is an ossuary from the eighteenth-nineteenth centuries by the church.
