= Hranice =

Hranice may refer to places in the Czech Republic:

- Hranice (České Budějovice District), a municipality in the South Bohemian Region
- Hranice (Cheb District), a town in the Karlovy Vary Region
- Hranice (Přerov District), a town in the Olomouc Region
  - Hranice Abyss, an abyss in Hranice
  - SK Hranice, a football club in Hranice
