= German minority in Poland =

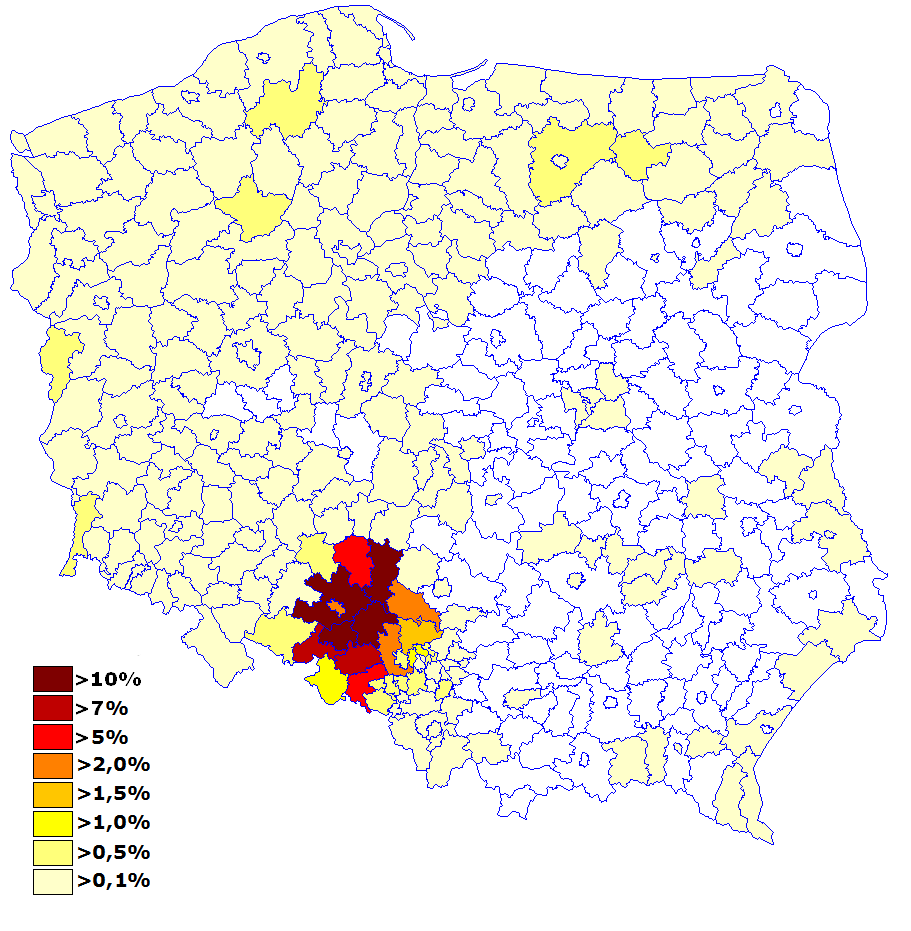
- Percentage of the German population in Poland in 2021.

Total population
- 144,178

Regions with significant populations
- South-Central region near Opole

Languages
- German, Polish

Religion
- Catholicism; Lutheranism

Related ethnic groups
- Germans, German Kazakhs

The registered German minority in Poland (Polish: Mniejszość niemiecka w Polsce; German: Deutsche Minderheit in Polen) is a group of German people that inhabit Poland, being the largest minority of the country. As of 2021, it had a population of 144,177.

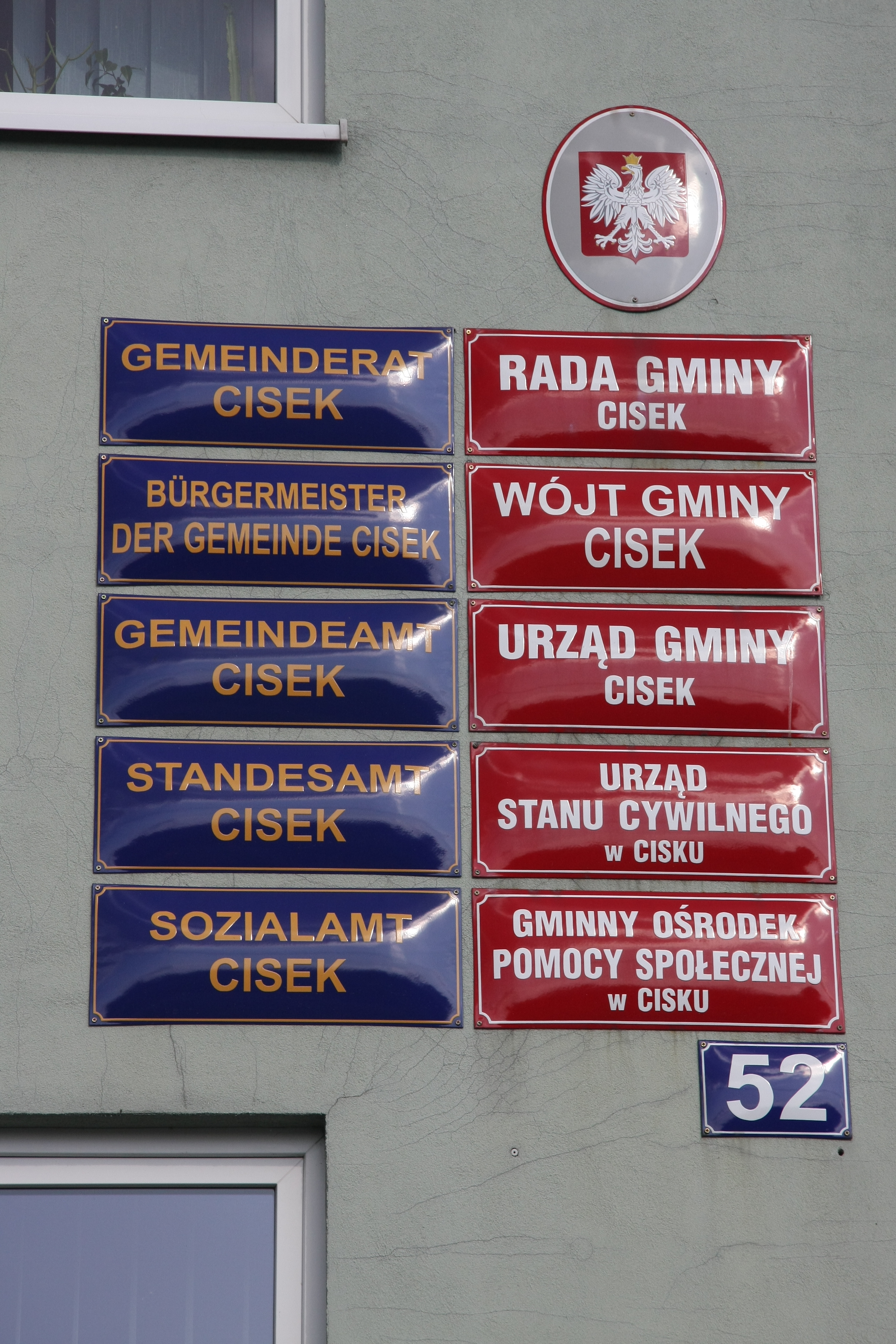
Example of bilingual labeling in German and Polish on the town hall of the Polish village of Cisek.

The German language is spoken in certain areas in Opole Voivodeship, where most of the minority resides, and in Silesian Voivodeship. German speakers first came to these regions (present-day Opole and Silesian Voivodeships) during the late Middle Ages. However, there are no localities in either Upper Silesia or Poland as a whole where German could be considered a language of everyday communication. The predominant home or family language of Poland's German minority in Upper Silesia used to be the Silesian German language (mainly Oberschlesisch (Upper Silesian dialect), but also Mundart des Brieg-Grottkauer Landes (dialect of the land of Brieg-Grottkau) was used west of Opole), but since 1945 Standard German replaced it as these Silesian German dialects went generally out of use except among the oldest generations which have by now completely died off. The German Minority electoral committee benefits from the provision in Polish election law which exempts national minorities from the 5% national threshold.

In the school year of 2014/15 there were 387 elementary schools in Poland (all in Upper Silesia), with over 37,000 students, in which German was taught as a minority language (that is, at least for three periods of 45 minutes in a week), hence de facto as a subject. There were no minority schools with German as the language of instruction, though there were three asymmetrically bilingual (Polish–German) schools, where most subjects were taught through the medium of Polish. Most members of the German minority are Roman Catholic, while some are Lutheran Protestants (the Evangelical-Augsburg Church).

== Germans in Poland today ==
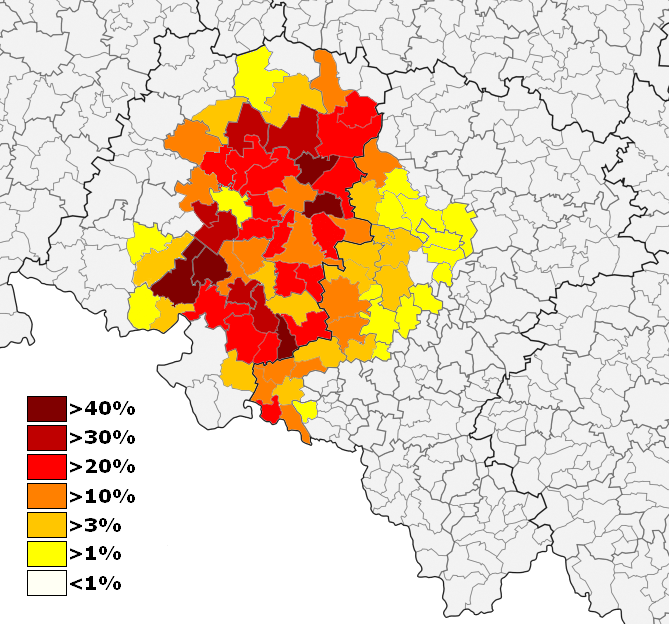
German minority in Upper Silesia: Opole Voivodeship (west) and Silesian Voivodeship (east) according to the 2002 census.

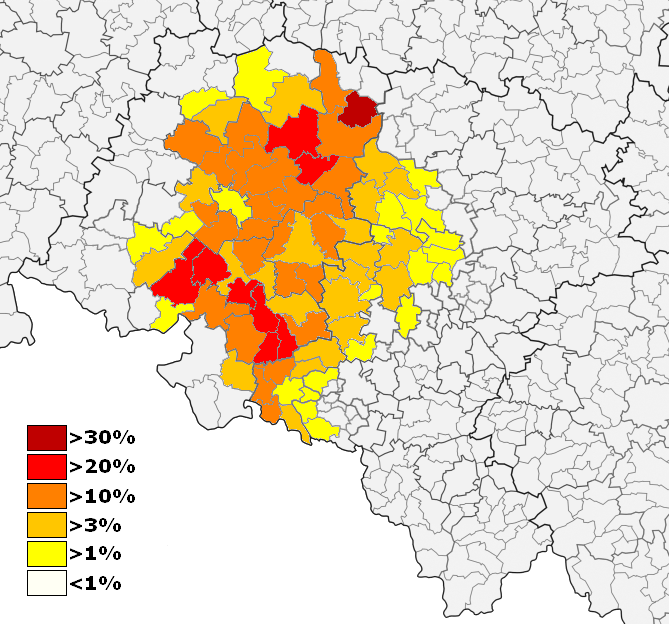
German minority in Upper Silesia: Opole Voivodeship (west) and Silesian Voivodeship (east) according to the 2021 census.

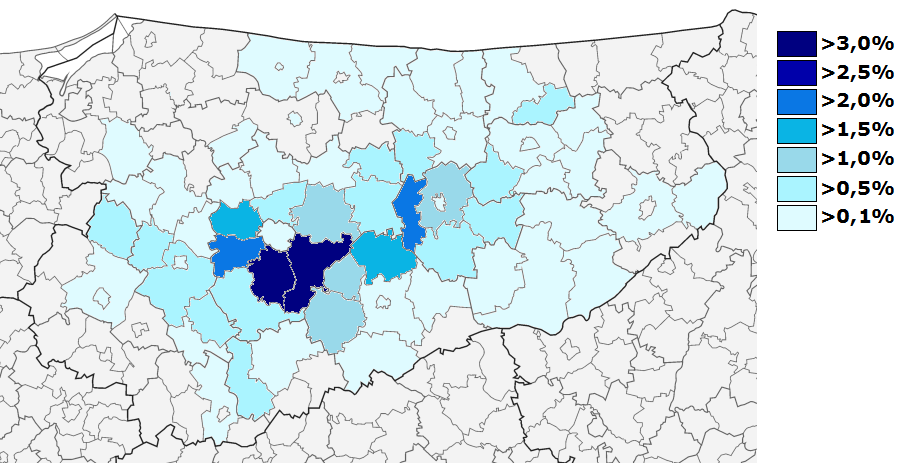
German minority in Warmia and Masuria according to the 2002 census.

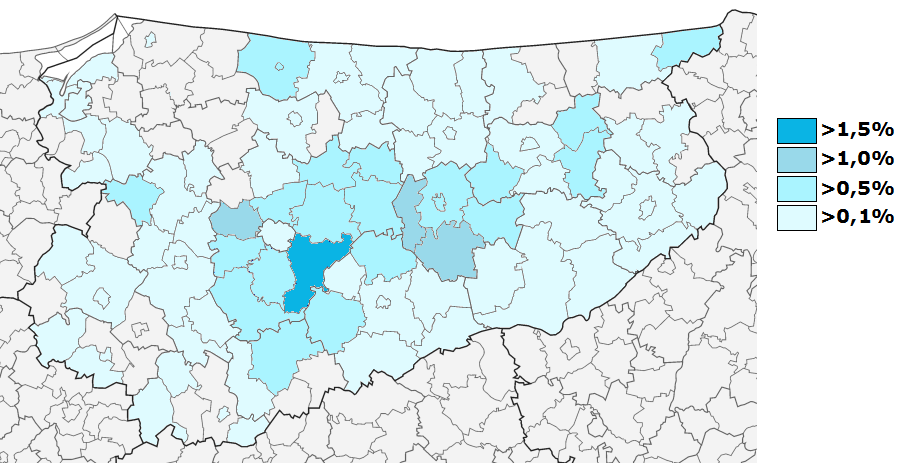
German minority in Warmia and Masuria according to the 2021 census.

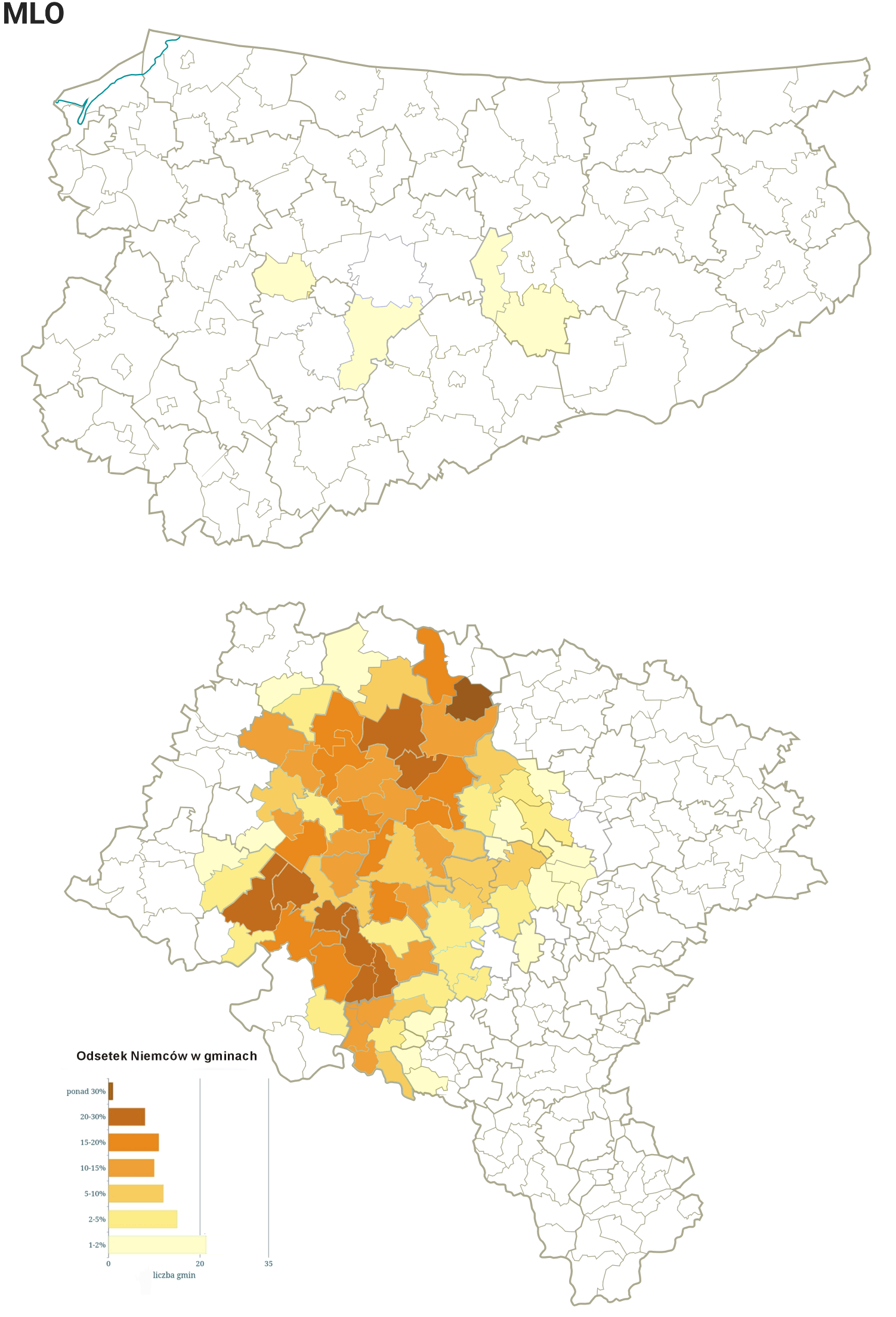
Germans in the Opole, Silesian and Warmian-Masurian Voivodeships according to the 2021 census

According to the 2021 census, most of the Germans in Poland (67.2%) live in Silesia: 59,911 in the Opole Voivodeship, i.e. 41.6% of all Germans in Poland and a share of 6.57% of the local population; 27,923 in the Silesian Voivodeship, i.e. 19.4% of all Germans in Poland and 0.66% of the local population; plus 8,978 in the Lower Silesian Voivodeship, i.e. 6.2% of all Germans in Poland, though only 0.31% of the local population.

Towns with particularly high concentrations of German speakers in Opole Voivodeship include: Strzelce Opolskie; Dobrodzien; Prudnik; Głogówek; and Gogolin.

Region	Population	German	% German
Opole Voivodeship	911,971	59,911	6.57
Silesian Voivodeship	4,204,536	27,923	0.66
Lubusz Voivodeship	985,532	3,478	0.35
Warmian-Masurian Voivodeship	1,371,380	4,717	0.34
West Pomeranian Voivodeship	1,647,530	5,222	0.32
Lower Silesian Voivodeship	2,883,187	8,978	0.31
Pomeranian Voivodeship	2,332,928	7,055	0.30
Kuyavian-Pomeranian Voivodeship	2,019,680	3,939	0.20
Greater Poland Voivodeship	3,490,414	6,306	0.18
Lublin Voivodeship	985,532	1,737	0.18
Lesser Poland Voivodeship	3,415,178	3,409	0.10
Łódź Voivodeship	2,400,874	2,378	0.10
Masovian Voivodeship	5,475,754	5,318	0.10
Świętokrzyskie Voivodeship	1,192,985	1,134	0.10
Subcarpathian Voivodeship	2,085,006	1,757	0.08
Podlaskie Voivodeship	1,133,137	915	0.08
Poland	38,036,118	144,177	0.37
Source (2021, diverging): Główny Urząd Statystyczny, Warsaw; Census results.

Poland was the third most frequent destination for migrant Germans in 2009, after the United States and Switzerland, dropping to 8th most frequent in 2015.

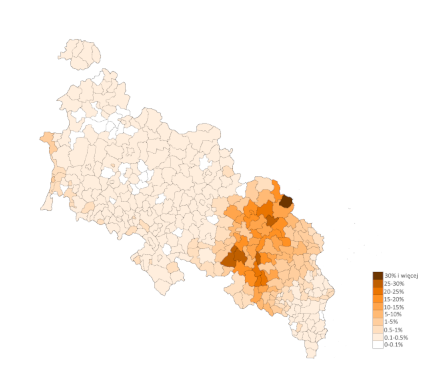
Germans in Silesia according to 2021 census

== History of Germans in Poland ==
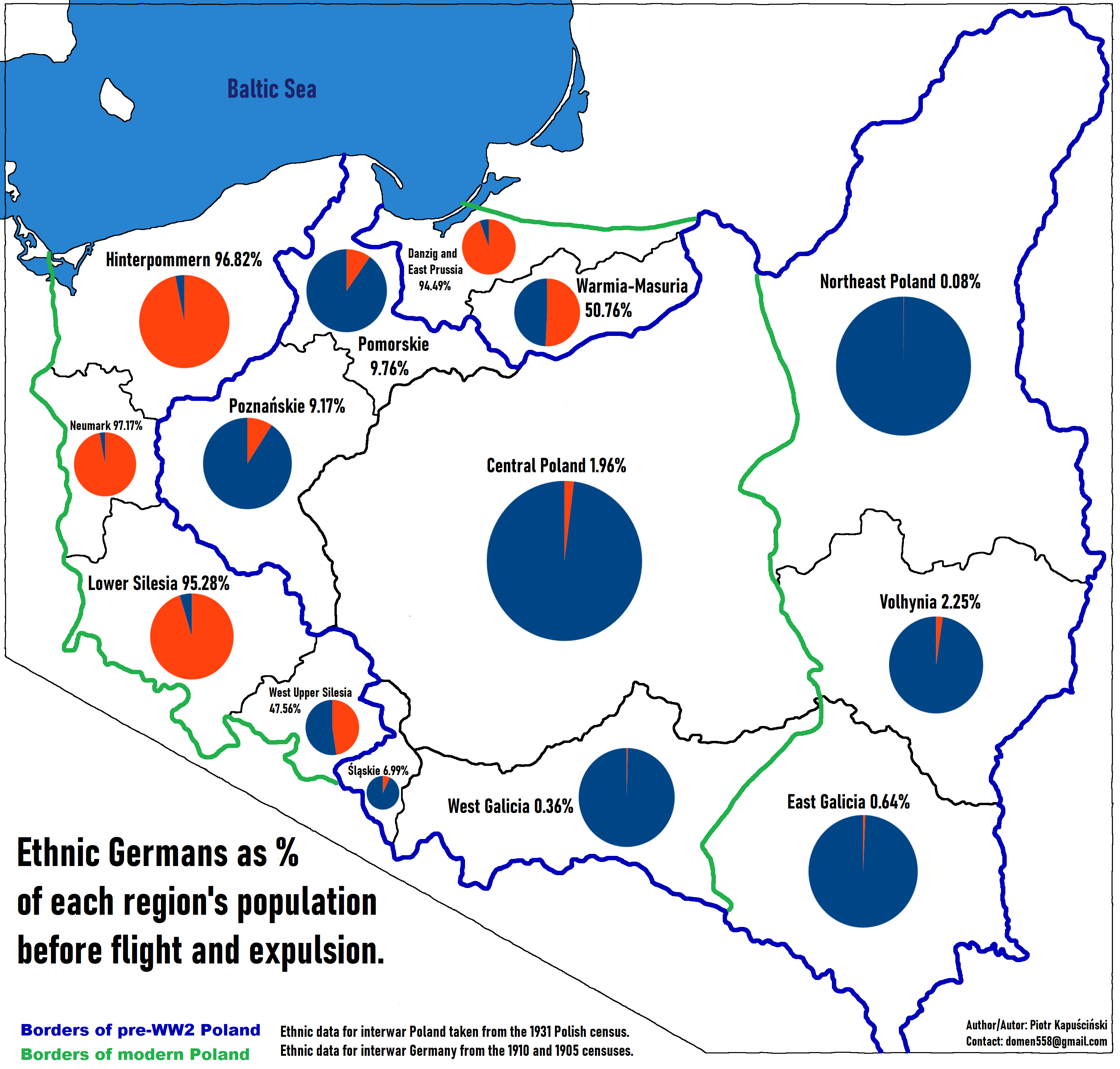
Germans as percent of population before the flight and expulsion

German migration into areas that form part of present-day Poland began with the medieval Ostsiedlung (see also Walddeutsche in the Subcarpathian region). Regions which subsequently became part of the Kingdom of Prussia – Lower Silesia, East Brandenburg, Pomerania and East Prussia – were predominantly German speaking by the High Middle Ages. In other areas of modern-day Poland there were substantial German populations, most notably in the historical regions of Pomerelia, Upper Silesia, and Posen or Greater Poland. In the 19th century, Germans became actively involved in developing the clothmaking industry in what is now central Poland. Over 3,000 villages and towns within Russian Poland are recorded as having German residents. Many of these Germans remained east of the Curzon line after World War I ended in 1918, including a significant number in Volhynia. In the late 19th century, some Germans moved westward during the Ostflucht, while a Prussian Settlement Commission established others in Central Poland.

According to the 1931 census, around 740,000 German speakers lived in Poland (2.3% of the population). Their minority rights were protected by the Little Treaty of Versailles of 1919. The right to appeal to the League of Nations however was renounced by the League of Nations in 1934, officially due to Germany's withdrawal from the League (September 1933) after Adolf Hitler became German Chancellor in January 1933.

Number of Germans in Poland according to the 1931 census
Voivodeship or city	Population	German-speakers	% German
Poznań Voivodeship	1860030	186693	10.0%
Poznań City	246470	6387	2.6%
Pomeranian Voivodeship	1080138	105400	9.8%
Silesian Voivodeship	1295027	90545	7.0%
Łódź Voivodeship	2027381	101753	5.0%
Łódź City	604629	53562	8.9%
Warsaw Voivodeship	2529228	73592	2.9%
Warsaw City	1171898	1892	0.2%
Wołyń Voivodeship	2085574	46883	2.2%
Stanisławów Voivodeship	1480285	16737	1.1%
Lwów Voivodeship	2815178	9601	0.3%
Lwów City	312231	2448	0.8%
Lublin Voivodeship	2464936	15865	0.6%
Białystok Voivodeship	1643844	7290	0.4%
Kraków Voivodeship	2078516	8192	0.4%
Kraków City	219286	740	0.3%
Wilno Voivodeship	1080868	796	0.1%
Wilno City	195071	561	0.3%
Kielce Voivodeship	2935697	7938	0.3%
Tarnopol Voivodeship	1600406	2675	0.2%
Polesie Voivodeship	1131939	1063	0.1%
Nowogródek Voivodeship	1057147	379	0.0%
Second Polish Republic	31915779	740992	2.3%

=== World War II ===
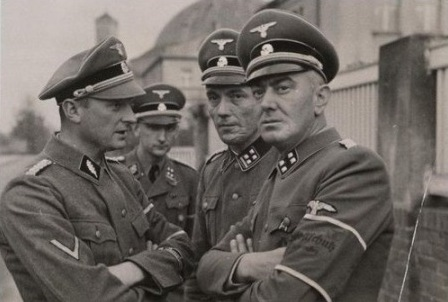
Commanders of the Volksdeutscher Selbstschutz, a paramilitary organization composed of members of the German minority living in pre-war Poland, 1939

After Nazi Germany's invasion of the Second Polish Republic in September 1939, many members of the German minority (around 25%) joined the ethnic German paramilitary organisation Volksdeutscher Selbstschutz. When the German occupation of Poland began, the Selbstschutz took an active part in Nazi crimes against ethnic Poles. Due to their pre-war interactions with the Polish majority, they were able to prepare lists of Polish intellectuals and civil servants whom the Nazis selected for extermination. The organisation actively participated in and was responsible for the deaths of about 50,000 Poles.

Following the outbreak of World War II in September 1939, the Soviets annexed a massive portion of the eastern part of Poland (November 1939) in the wake of an August 1939 agreement between the Reich and the USSR. During the German occupation of Poland during the war (1939–1945), the Nazis forcibly resettled ethnic Germans from other areas of Central Europe (such as the Baltic states) in the pre-war territory of Poland. At the same time the Nazi authorities expelled, enslaved and killed Poles and Jews.

=== Cold War ===
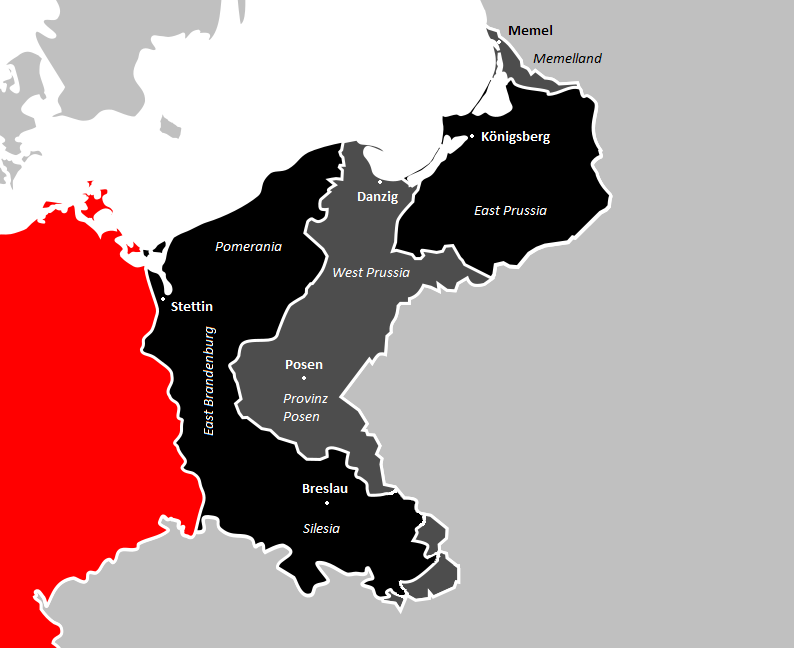
Former eastern territories of Germany annexed by Poland

After the Nazis' defeat in 1945, Poland did not regain its Soviet-annexed territory; instead, Polish communists, directed by the Soviets, expelled the remaining Germans who had not already been evacuated or fled from the areas of Lower Silesia, Upper Silesia, Farther Pomerania, East Brandenburg, and East Prussia and made Poles take their place, some of whom were expelled from Soviet-occupied areas that had previously formed part of Poland. About half of East Prussia became the newly created Soviet territory of Kaliningrad Oblast (officially established in 1946), where Soviet citizens replaced the former German residents. Claims to a border along the Oder-Neisse line were presented at the Potsdam Conference of August 1945 by a delegation of Polish politicians. However the conference eventually specified or endorsed the shifting of borders pending a later peace treaty. In the following years, the communists and activists inspired by the Myśl zachodnia ("Western thought") strove to "de-Germanize" and to "re-Polonize" the huge land, propagandistically termed "Recovered Territories".

Since the downfall of the Polish Communist regime in 1989, the German minorities' political situation in modern-day Poland has improved, and after Poland joined the European Union in the 2004 enlargement and was incorporated into the Schengen Area, German citizens are now allowed to buy land and property in the areas where they or their ancestors used to live, and can return there if they wish. However, none of their properties have been returned after being confiscated.

A possible demonstration of the ambiguity of the Polish-German minority position can be seen in the life and career of Waldemar Kraft, a minister without portfolio in the West German Bundestag during the 1950s. However, most of the German minority had not been as involved in the Nazi system as Kraft was.

There is no clear-cut division in Poland between the Germans and some other minorities, whose heritage is similar in some respects due to centuries of assimilation, Germanisation and intermarriage, but differs in other respects due to either ancient regional West Slavic roots or Polonisation. Such minorities include the Slovincians (Lebakaschuben), the Masurians and the Silesians of Upper Silesia. While in the past these people have been claimed for both Polish and German ethnicity, it really depends on their self-perception which they choose to belong to.

== German Poles ==
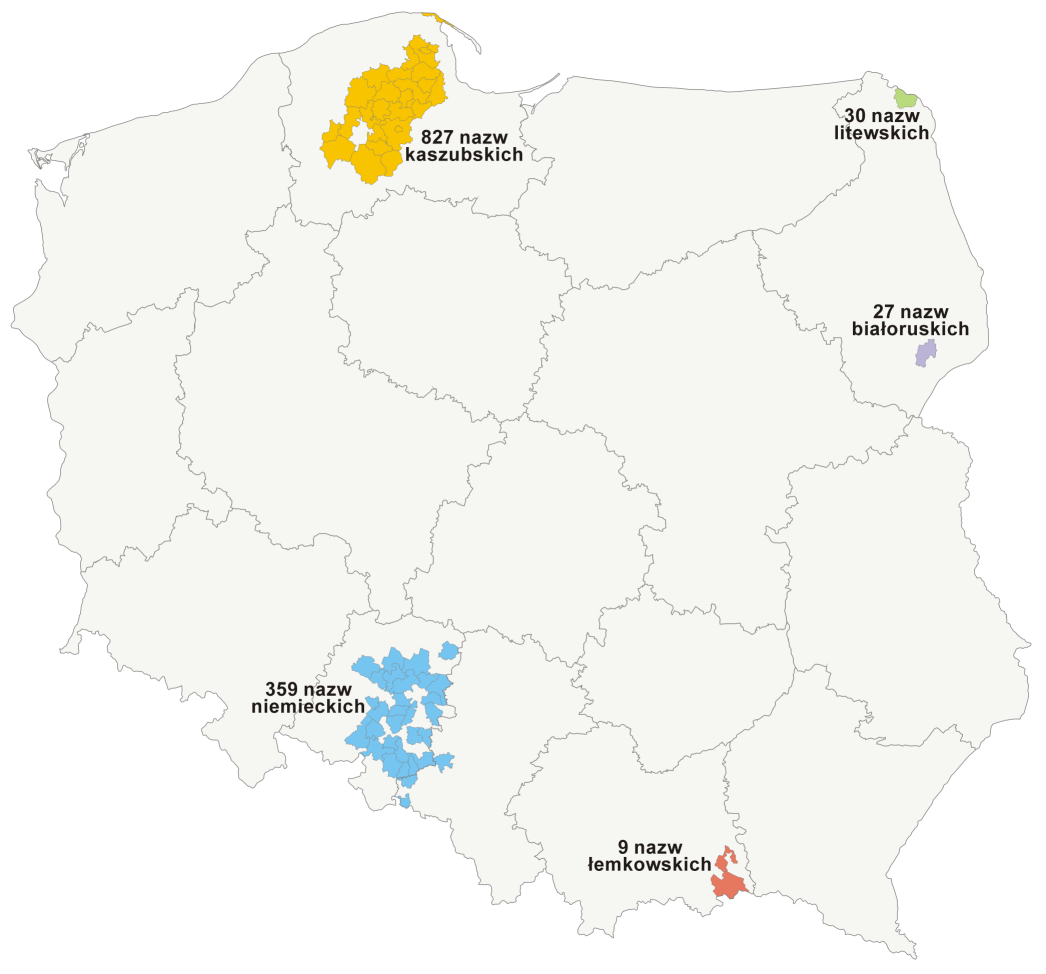
Communes in Poland in which additional minority names were introduced (as of 1 December 2009). In blue – German names in the Opole and Silesian Voivodeships (total of 238 German names in Silesia)

The term "German Poles" (German: Deutsche Polen, Polish: Polacy pochodzenia niemieckiego) may refer to either Poles of German descent or sometimes to Polish citizens whose ancestors held German citizenship before World War II, regardless of their ethnicity.

After the flight and expulsion of Germans from Poland, the largest of a series of flights and expulsions of Germans in Europe during and after World War II, over 1 million former citizens of Germany were naturalized and granted Polish citizenship. Some of them were forced to stay in Poland, while others wanted to stay because these territories were inhabited by their families for hundreds of years. The lowest estimate by West German Schieder commission of 1953, is that 910,000 former German citizens were granted Polish citizenship by 1950. Higher estimates say that 1,043,550 or 1,165,000 were naturalized as Polish citizens by 1950.

=== Post-World War II ===
After the end of expulsions, Polish sources of 1948–49 report that 125,000 to 160,000 lived on what was now Polish territory, but according to West German information, the number was 430,000 or even 900,000. It can be assumed today that the Polish figures were vastly understated and the West German figures were probably exaggerated, but ultimately closer to reality.

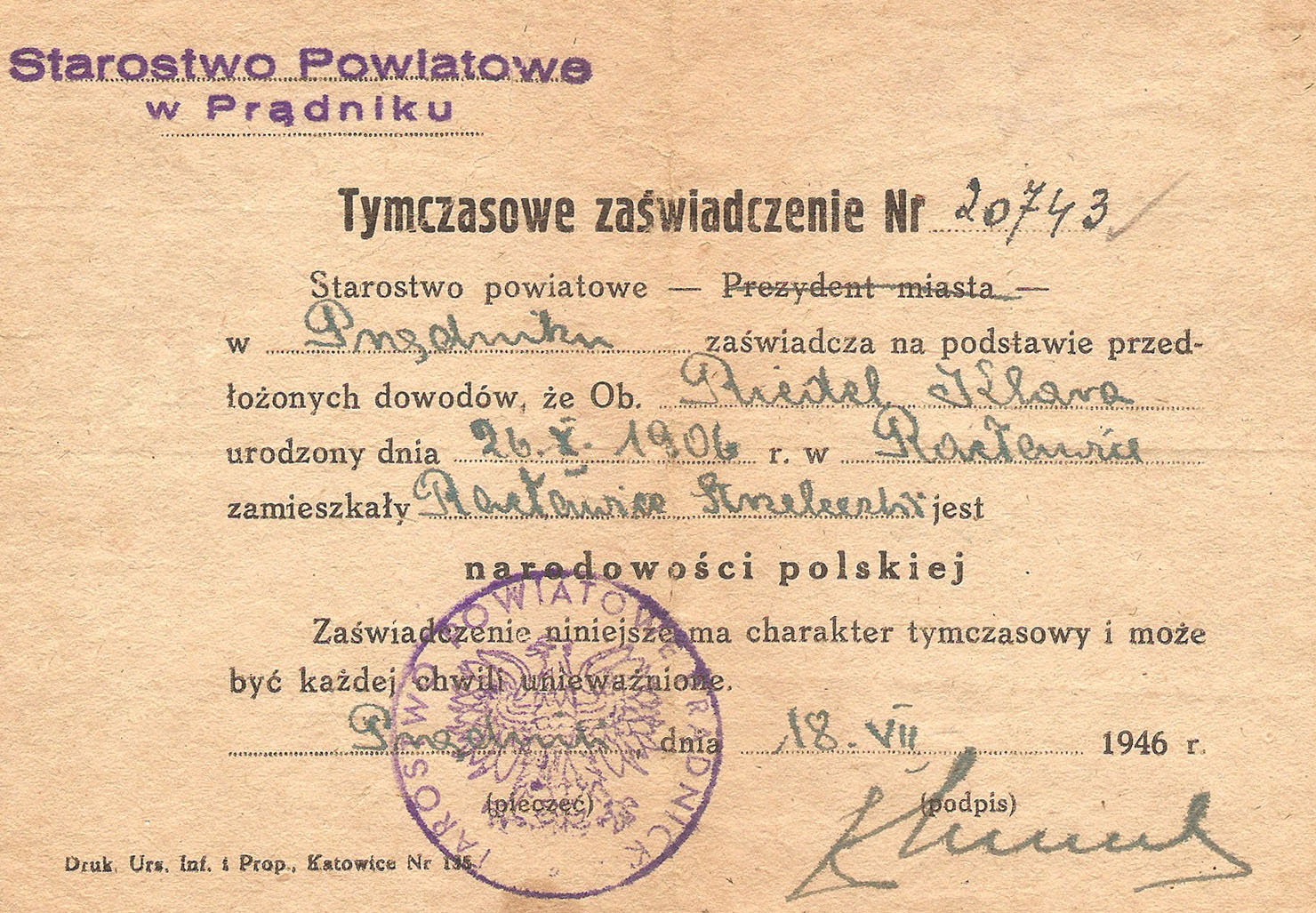
A temporary certificate of Polish nationality issued by the county office of Prudnik in 1946

In order to understand the reported numbers it must be borne in mind that many former German citizens were "verified" as Polish, as they were alleged to be of Polish ancestry but subjected to centuries of Germanization. The Polish referred to these people using the propagandistic term “autochthonous”, as opposed to those Germans whose ancestors came to the region in the Middle Ages. In West Germany, and, internally, also for East Germany, these "autochthons" counted as Germans. Also, in 1951 those "autochthons" who had emphatically resisted verification were compulsorily given Polish citizenship; but many “verified autochthons” resisted the Polish assimilation policy, which was often accompanied by discrimination.

In 1951, Polish law restored equal rights to Germans in Poland in working life and in cultural and educational matters. However, this decision was not fully implemented until 1956.

Germans of Poland at the time hence consisted of:

- citizens of the German Reich who had always been residents of the territories now annexed to Poland;
- members of the German minority in the Second Polish Republic;
- Germans who had been resettled by the German authorities in Polish areas during the war, including evacuees due to bombing;
- Germans who were married to Poles, their children and grandchildren; and
- the so-called autochthons.

At the end of the 1950s, regional concentrations of Germans in Poland existed in the new Polish western and northern areas and in the Silesian area, especially in the regions of Olsztyn, Wrocław, Gdansk and Katowice and Opole.

However, the vast majority of Germans were the so-called "autochthons" who were allowed to stay in post-war Poland after declaring Polish ethnicity in a special verification process. Thus most of them were inhabitants of Polish descent of the pre-war border regions of Upper Silesia and Warmia-Masuria. Sometimes they were called Wasserpolnisch or Wasserpolak. These people were allowed to reclaim their former German citizenship on application, and under German Basic Law were "considered as not having been deprived of their German citizenship if they have established their domicile in Germany after May 8, 1945, and have not expressed a contrary intention". Because of this, many of them left the People's Republic of Poland due to its undemocratic political system and economic problems.

Also, a great many of families, due to war, flight, and expulsion, had been torn apart by the border shift and now pressured the German authorities to support their relatives to leave Poland. During the 1950s, negotiations for family reunions were conducted between Poland and East Germany. However, anything that went beyond the reunification of separated spouses or minor children with their parents was rejected by the Polish authorities.

From 1956 on, family reunions to both East Germany (GDR) and West Germany were handled more liberally, but the more generous exit policy for Germans from Poland was flanked by massive attempts by the Polish and GDR authorities to influence the German minority to stay in Poland or move to the GDR rather than to West Germany. In 1959/1960, as had been the case several times in the 1950s, family reunifications were declared complete by the Polish. In yet another phase of emigration negotiated in 1964, the number of applications to move to the GDR surprised both the Polish and the East German sides, and the Polish authorities now strove to limit the emigration.

The European policy of détente at the beginning of the 1970s, and in particular the signing of the Warsaw Treaty, ushered in the next phase of family reunions and departures of Germans, particularly the "autochthonous" population, from Poland, especially to the Federal Republic of Germany.

Eventually, the Polish had to realize that their assimilation policy towards the German minority (both the German citizens and the so-called "autochthons" who insisted on their German ethnicity) had failed.

In total, in the Cold War era, hundreds of thousands of Polish citizens decided to emigrate to West Germany and, to a lesser extent, to East Germany. Despite that, hundreds or tens of thousands of former German citizens remained in Poland. Some of them created families with other Poles, who, in the vast majority, were settlers from central Poland or were resettled from the former eastern territories of Poland by the Soviets to the Recovered Territories (Former eastern territories of Germany).

Since the fall of communism in Poland, several socio-cultural organisations to promote German culture and language among the German minorities in Poland were created, including the German Socio-Cultural Organisation in Wrocław and other organisations in cities such as Opole.

== Education ==
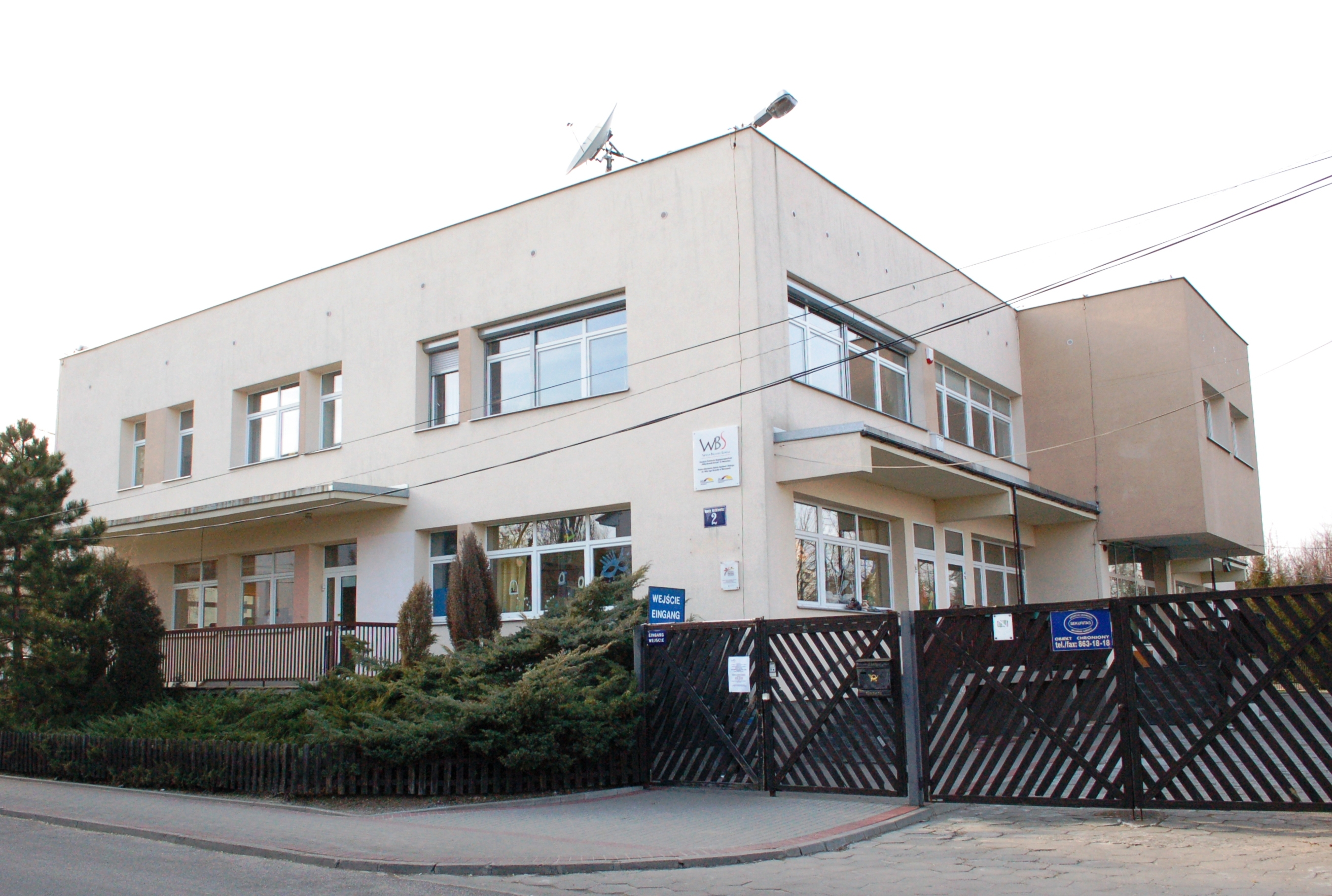
Willy-Brandt-Schule in Warsaw

There is one German international school in Poland, Willy-Brandt-Schule in Warsaw.

== Notable Poles of German descent ==
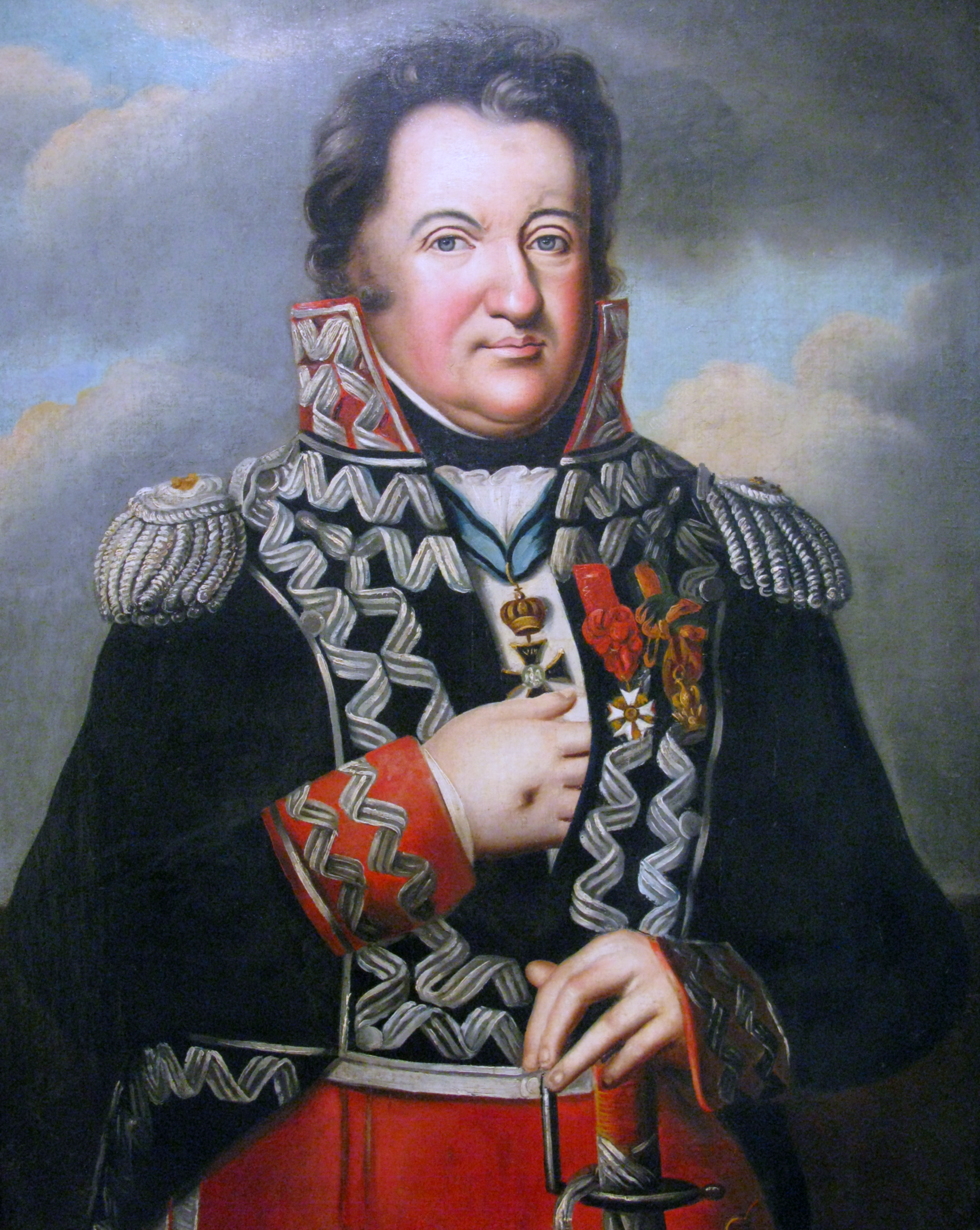
Jan Henryk Dąbrowski, the Polish national hero of German ancestry (mother of German descent).

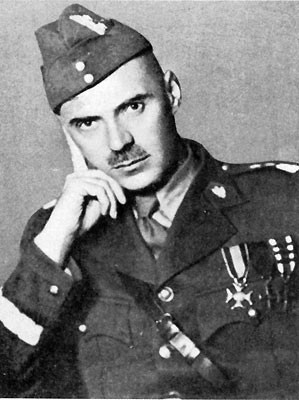
Władysław Anders, a general in the Polish Army and prominent member of the Polish government-in-exile in London was of Baltic-German ancestry.

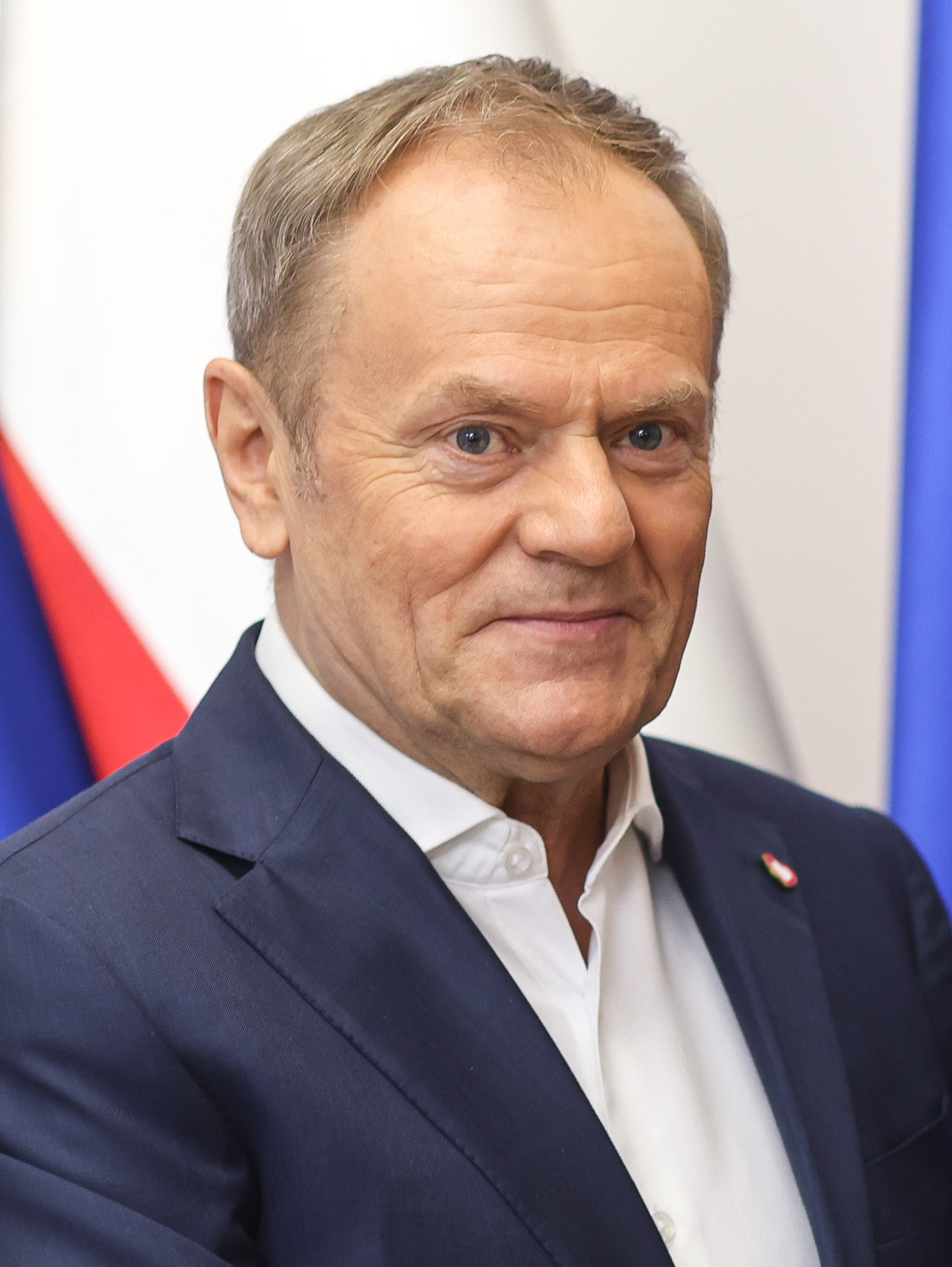
Donald Tusk, Prime Minister of Poland since 2023 had a grandmother of German ancestry.

- Władysław Anders (1892–1970), general, leader of the Polish 2nd Corps during World War II and prominent member of the Polish government-in-exile in London
- Grzegorz Braun (born 1967), journalist, academic lecturer, movie director, screenwriter and far-right politician
- Izabela Czartoryska (1746–1835), noblewoman, née Flemming, writer, art collector, and founder of the first Polish museum, the Czartoryski Museum in Kraków
- Jan Henryk Dąbrowski (1755–1818), general and Polish national hero
- Stanisław Ernest Denhoff (1673–1728), noble, politician and military leader
- Karol Estreicher (senior) (1827–1908), father of Polish bibliography and founder of the Polish Academy of Learning
- Adam Fastnacht (1913–1987), historian and member of Armia Krajowa
- Jan Fethke (1903–1980), film director, author and proponent of Esperanto language
- Emil August Fieldorf (1895–1953), Polish general during World War I and World War II
- Franciszek Fiszer (1860–1937), author, bon-vivant and philosopher
- Mark Forster (born 1983), singer, songwriter and TV personality
- Anna German (1936–1982), popular singer
- Małgorzata Gersdorf (born 1952), lawyer, judge, Head of Supreme Court of Poland
- Wanda Gertz (1896–1958), decorated officer in the Polish Army during World War II
- Roman Giertych (born 1971), lawyer, advocate, former Deputy Prime Minister
- Kamil Glik (born 1988), footballer
- Henryk Grohman (1862–1939), industrialist
- Jan Albin Goetz-Okocimski (1864–1931), brewer, head of Okocim Brewery
- Józef Haller (1873–1960), Polish general, political and social activist
- Marek Jędraszewski (born 1949), Archbishop of Kraków since 2016 (his mother was connected with Bambers)
- Miroslav Klose (born 1978), footballer
- Maximilian Kolbe (1894–1941), Polish Conventual Franciscan friar, murdered in Auschwitz and subsequently canonised
- Henryk Korowicz (1888–1941), professor, economist, and rector of Academy of Foreign Trade in Lwów, murdered by the Gestapo
- Janusz Korwin-Mikke (born 1942), controversial far-right politician and writer
- Gustaf Kossinna (1858–1931), linguist and archaeologist
- Juliusz Karol Kunitzer (1843–1905), industrialist, economic activist and industrial magnate in Congress Poland
- Karolina Lanckorońska (1898–2002), like her father (Count Karol Lanckoroński) an art collector and philanthropist
- Joachim Lelewel (1786–1861), Polish historian and politician
- Samuel Linde (1771–1847), linguist, librarian and lexicographer of the Polish language
- Tadeusz Manteuffel (1902–1970), historian
- Joachim Marx (born 1944), football player and coach
- Sławomir Mentzen (born 1986), entrepreneur, tax advisor and far-right politician
- Suzanna von Nathusius (born 2000), child actor
- Wilhelm Orlik-Rückemann (1894–1986), Polish general and military commander
- Emilia Plater (1806–1831), noblewoman and revolutionary
- Lukas Podolski (born 1985), footballer
- Nelli Rokita (born 1957), politician of Law and Justice party in Poland
- Raphael Schäfer (born 1979), footballer
- Piotr Steinkeller (1799–1854), early industrialist and banker
- Jerzy Stuhr (1947–2024), film actor and director
- Romuald Traugutt (1826–1864), "dictator" of the January Uprising
- Donald Tusk (born 1957), politician, from 2023 Prime Minister of Poland
- Jozef Unrug (1884–1973), Prussian-born Polish admiral who helped to form the Polish Navy in independent Poland, inmate of Colditz
- Karol Ernest Wedel (1813–1902), confectioner
- Edward Werner (1878–1945), economist, judge and politician in the Second Polish Republic

== German media in Poland ==
- Schlesisches Wochenblatt
- Polen-rundschau
- Schlesien Aktuell – a German-language radio station from Opole
- Polskie Radio – public-service radio with online German edition (Deutsche Redaktion), as well as broadcasts in German
- Polen am Morgen – online newspaper, published daily since 1998

== See also ==
- Germany–Poland relations
- Bilingual communes in Poland
- German Minority (political party)
- Germans in the Czech Republic
- Polish minority in Germany
- Olędrzy
- Vistula Germans in Russian Poland
- Bambrzy
- Volksdeutsche
