= Strzelce Opolskie =

Town in Opole Voivodeship, Poland

Strzelce Opolskie Wielge Strzelce
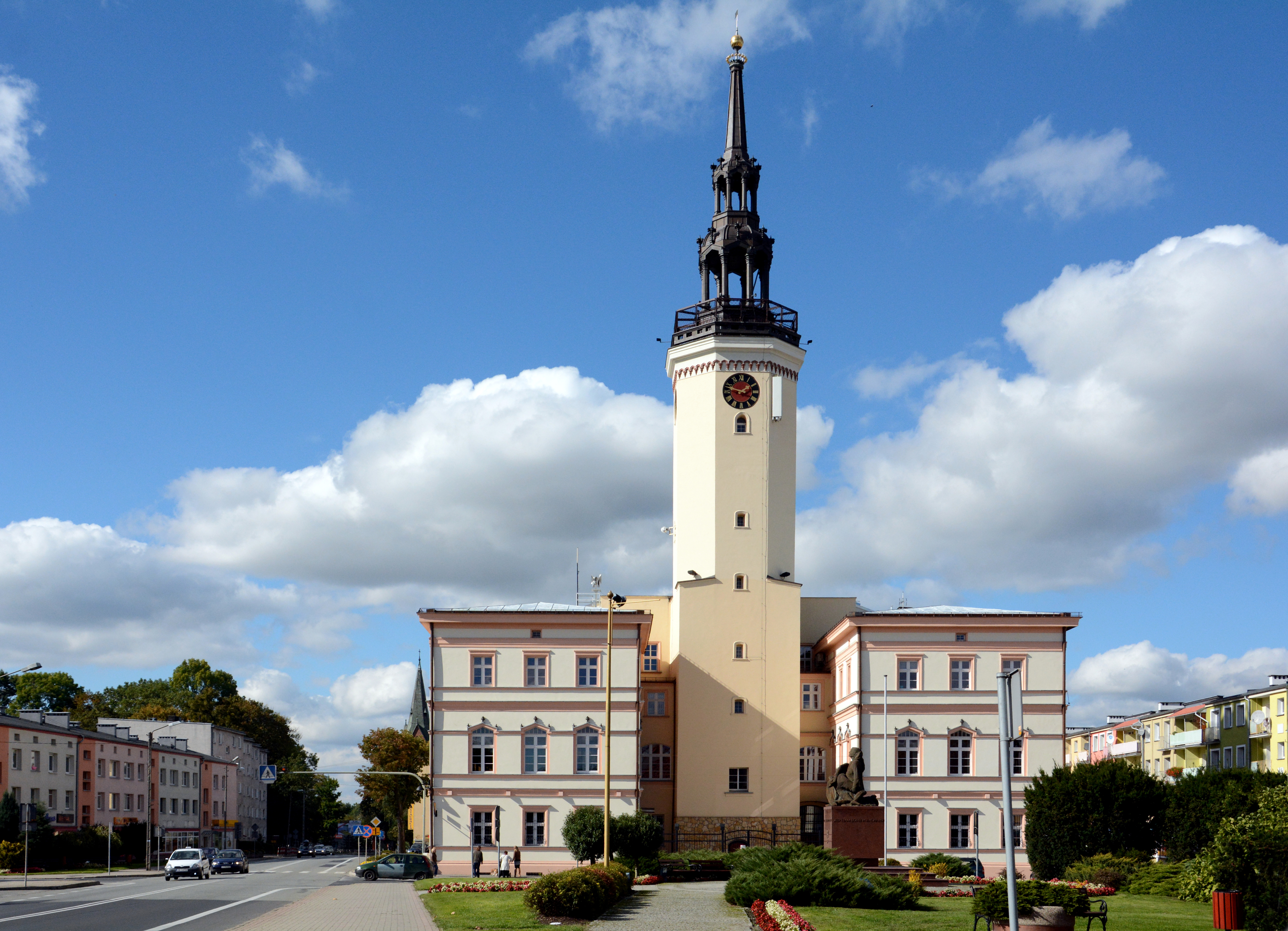
- Town hall

- Flag Coat of arms

- Location within Poland
- Coordinates: 50°30′N 18°17′E
- Country: Poland
- Voivodeship: Opole
- County: Strzelce
- Gmina: Strzelce Opolskie
- First mentioned: 13th century

Government
  - Mayor: Jan Wróblewski

Area
  - Total: 30.13 km^{2} (11.63 sq mi)

Population (2019-06-30)
  - Total: 17,900
  - Density: 594/km^{2} (1,540/sq mi)
- Time zone: UTC+1 (CET)
  - Summer (DST): UTC+2 (CEST)
- Postal code: 47-100
- Car plates: OST
- Website: http://www.strzelceopolskie.pl

Strzelce Opolskie [ˈstʂɛlt͡sɛ ɔˈpɔlskʲɛ] (Silesian: Wielge Strzelce, German: Groß Strehlitz) is a town in southern Poland with 17,900 inhabitants (2019), situated in the Opole Voivodeship. It is the capital of Strzelce County.

== Etymology ==
The name of the town is of Polish origin and comes from the old Polish word strzelec, which means "hunter" or "archer".

== History ==
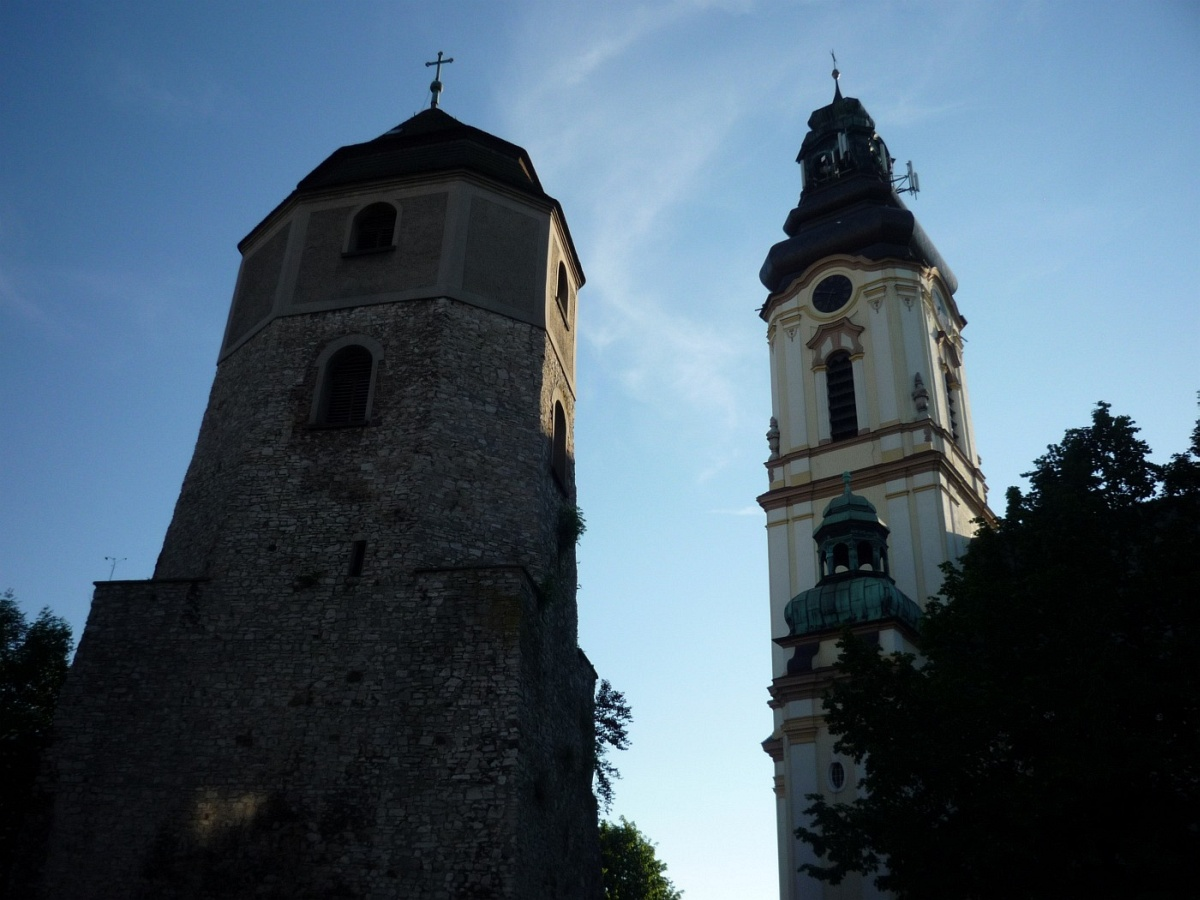
Medieval fortified tower and St. Lawrence church

The settlement was mentioned in 13th-century documents, when it was part of Piast-ruled Kingdom of Poland. It received town rights probably in the 13th century. Local dukes of the Piast dynasty erected a castle in the town.

The town was annexed by Prussia in the 18th century. In the 18th century, Strzelce Opolskie belonged to the tax inspection region of Prudnik. From the unification of Germany in 1871 until the end of World War II in 1945, the town was part of Germany. According to the German census of 1890, it had a population of 5,112, of which 500 (9.8%) were Poles. A local branch of the Polish Sokół movement was established in 1904, however, the local German authorities initially did not allow registration, threatened expulsion from the town, and led to the dismissal of two founders from the local sewerage company. Twelve company workers quit their jobs in solidarity and found new jobs in other towns.

In the Upper Silesia plebiscite held in 1921, the residents were asked to choose between remaining in Germany and rejoining Poland, which just regained independence after World War I. In Groß Strehlitz, 85.7% of the votes were cast in favour of remaining in Germany, whereas in the present-day districts (then neighbouring localities) of Nowa Wieś, Mokre Łany and Adamowice 69.7%, 59.9%, 59.2%, respectively, voted to rejoin Poland, and in Suche Łany 59.1% voted for Germany.

In a secret Sicherheitsdienst report from 1934, the town was named one of the main centers of the Polish movement in western Upper Silesia. Polish activists were persecuted intensively since 1937. In April and May 1939, multiple German attacks on Poles took place in the town. Nazi German militants attacked the actors of the Polish theater from Katowice and the gathered Polish public, and demolished the theater hall of the Polish bank. The Hitler Youth devastated the headquarters of Polish organizations, Polish enterprises (bank and cooperative) and houses of local Polish activists. In August and September 1939, the Germans carried out arrests of prominent local Poles, including chairmen of the Polish bank, cooperative and local branch of the "Sokół" Polish Gymnastic Society, and confiscated the assets of the Polish bank. During World War II, Nazi Germany operated a detention center where it would send prisoners to forced labour. Many died from exhaustion and/or starvation. Among the prisoners were Poles arrested for rescuing Jews from the Holocaust. The Germans also operated the E365 labour subcamp of the Stalag VIII-B/344 prisoner-of-war camp at the local lime quarry, and a forced labour camp for Jews. After the defeat of Germany in the war in 1945, the town became again part of Poland.

== Demographics ==
Strzelce Opolskie is one of the biggest centers of German minority in Poland.

== Transport ==
The town is located along the major rail line which joins Gliwice and Opole. Until 1999, there was a branch line connecting Strzelce Opolskie with Kędzierzyn Koźle. It closed as part of PKP's cost-cutting measures, although the rails still (2006) remain in site.

The town is located on the Polish National road No. 94, and the Voivodeship roads 409 and 426.

== Sports ==
The local football club is Piast Strzelce Opolskie with men and women sections. Both sections compete in the lower leagues.

== Notable people ==
- Hermann Bix (1914–1986), officer
- Piotr Domaradzki (1946–2015), journalist, essayist and historian
- Franziskus Eisenbach (1943-2024), Roman Catholic prelate
- Helmuth Förster (1889–1965), general
- Arkadiusz Jakubik (born 1969), actor, musician
- Heinz Kokott (1900–1976), general
- Krzysztof Mehlich (born 1974), hurdler, Olympic participant
- Erich Mende (1916–1998), politician
- Gustav Meyer (1850–1900), linguist and notable Albanologist
- Mirosław Sekuła (born 1955), chemist and politician
- Sławomir Szmal (born 1978), handball player

== Twin towns – sister cities ==
See twin towns of Gmina Strzelce Opolskie.

== Gallery ==
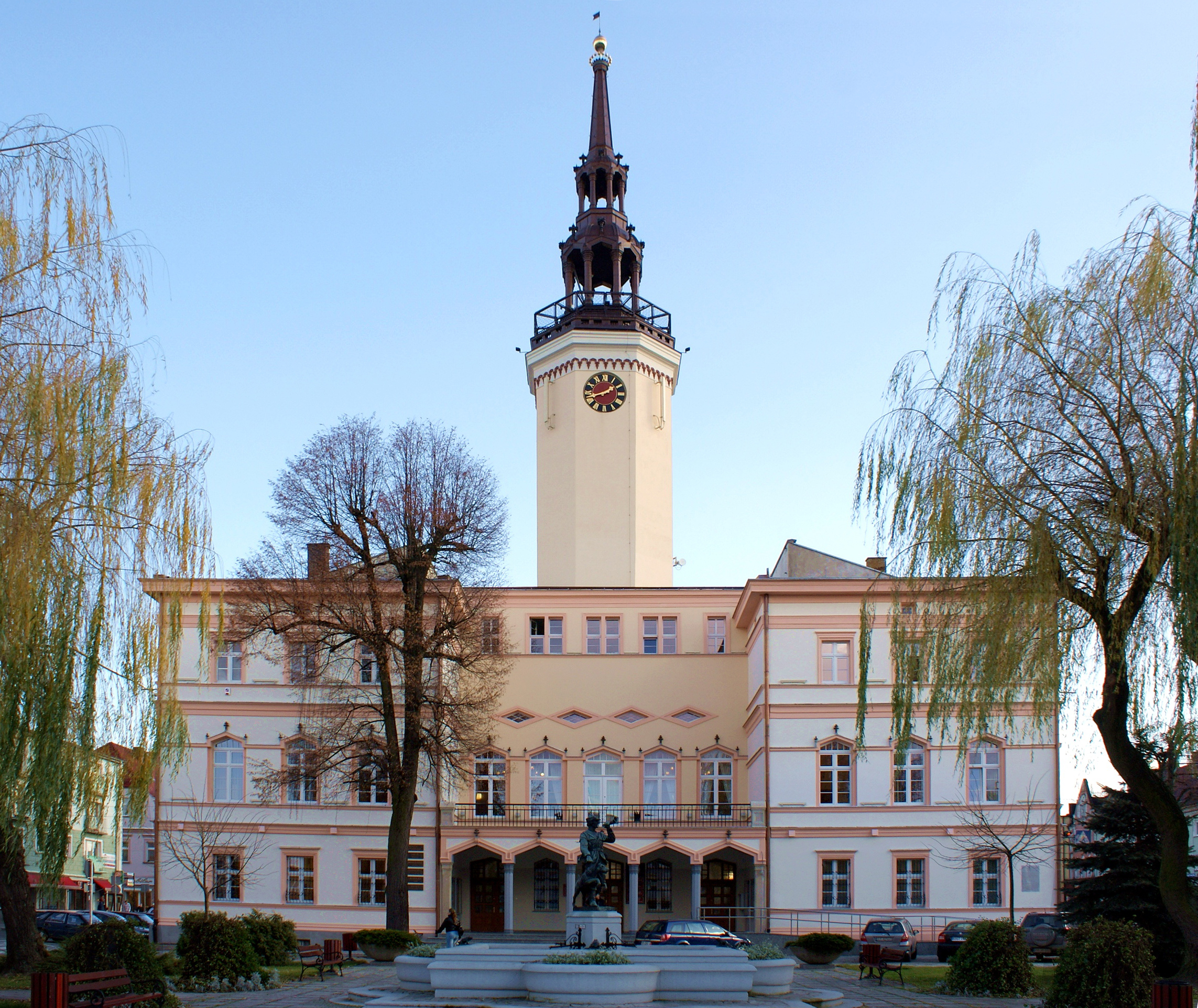
Town hall

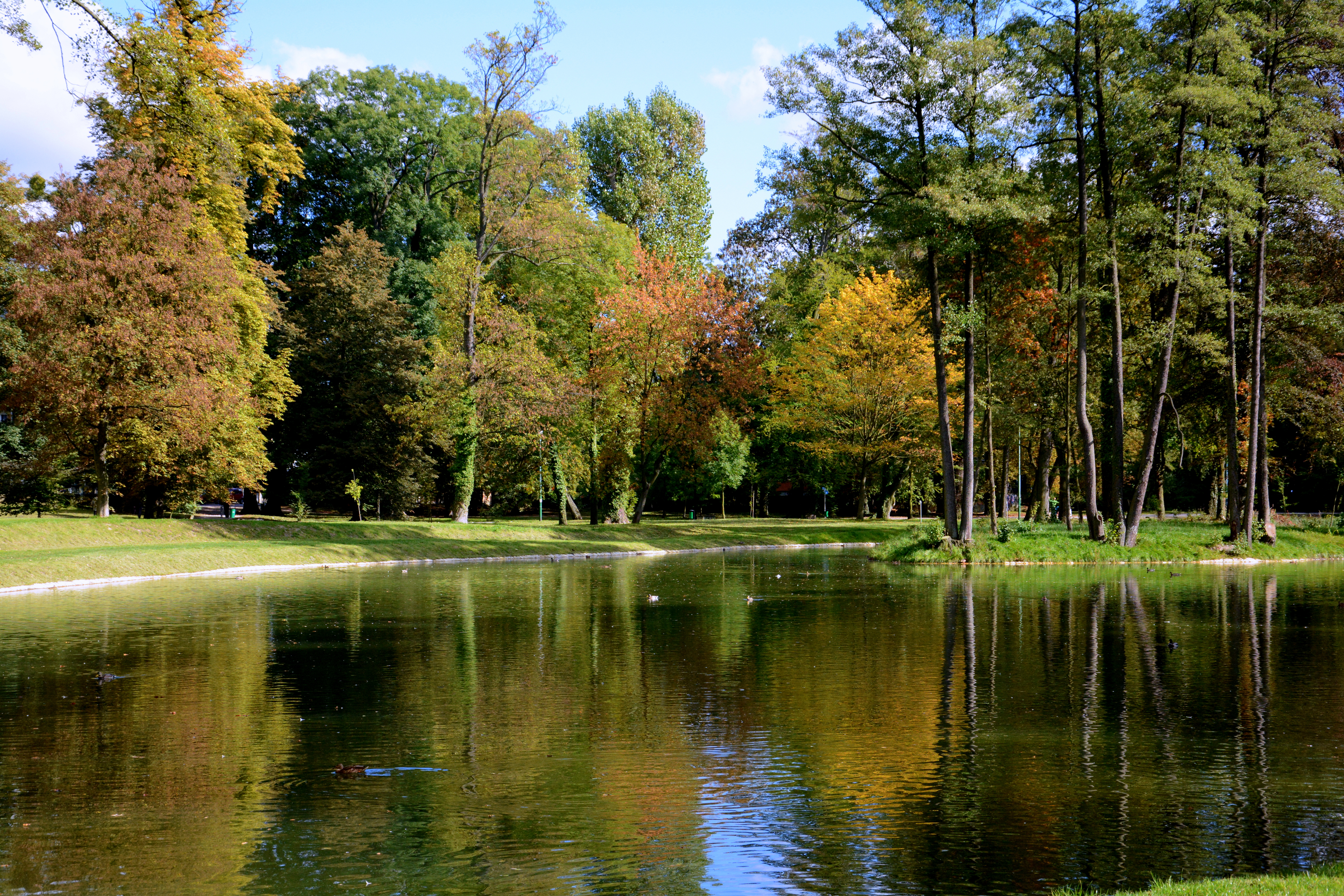
Castle park

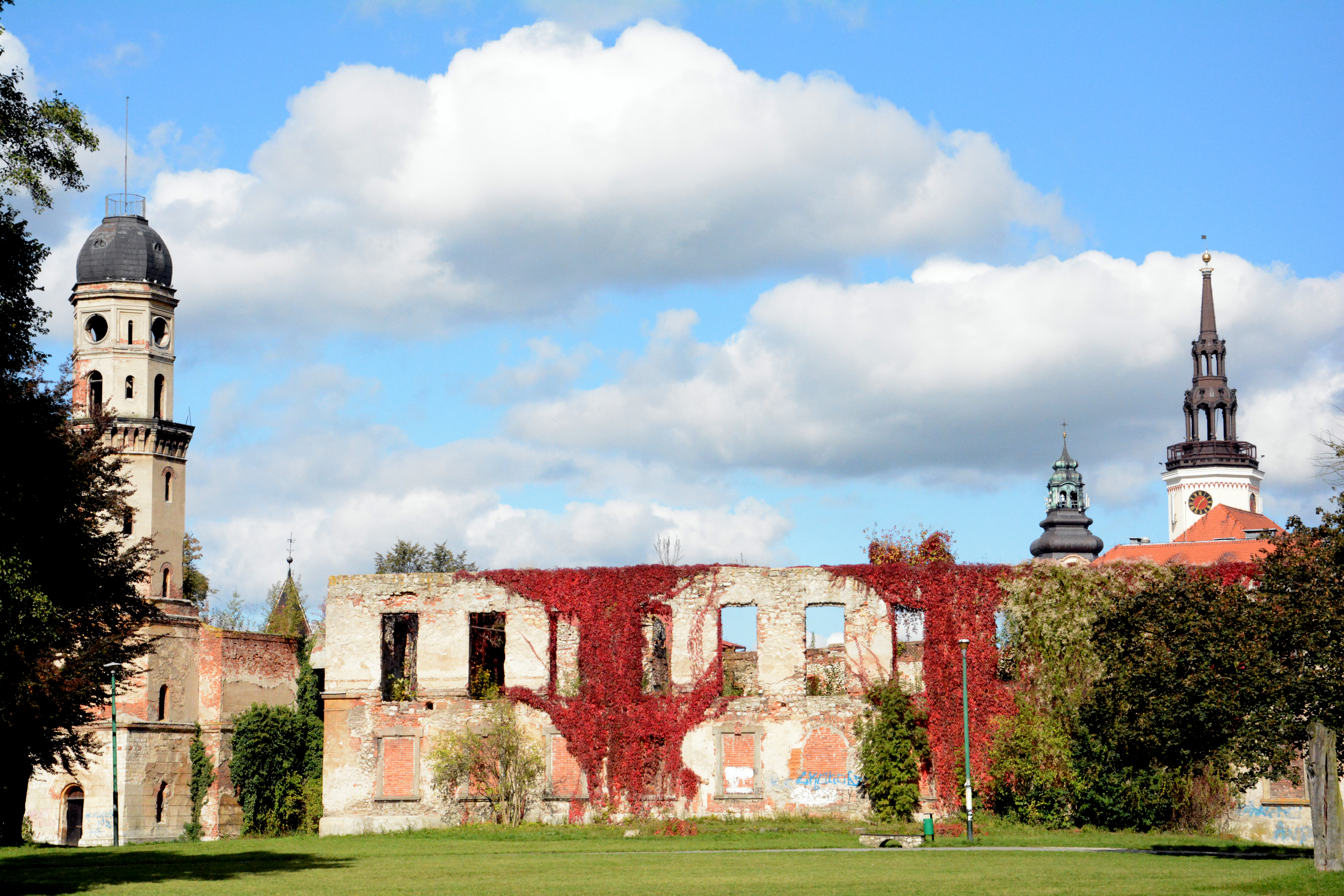
Ruins of the Piast Dukes' Castle, 14th century

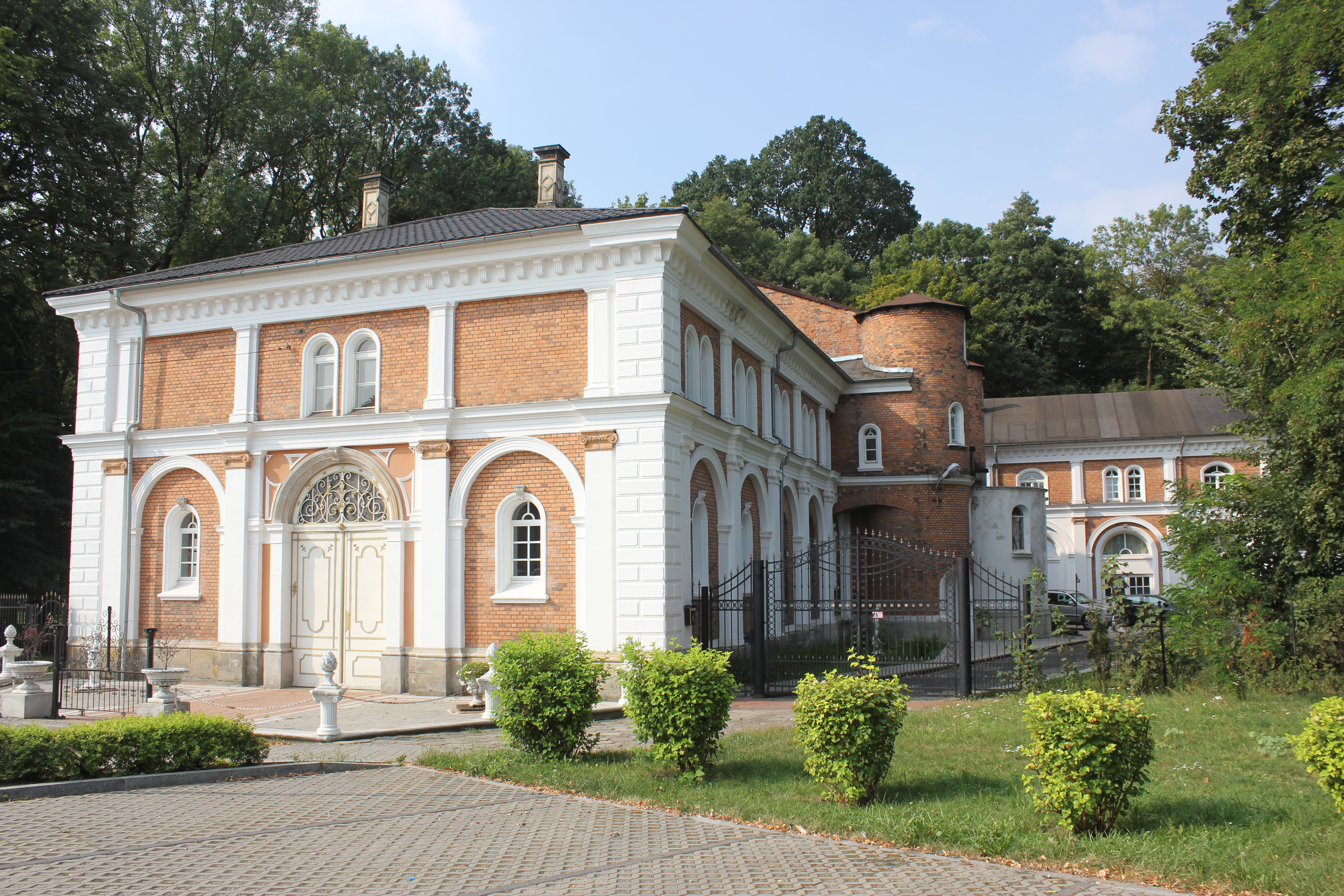
Old stable of the castle complex

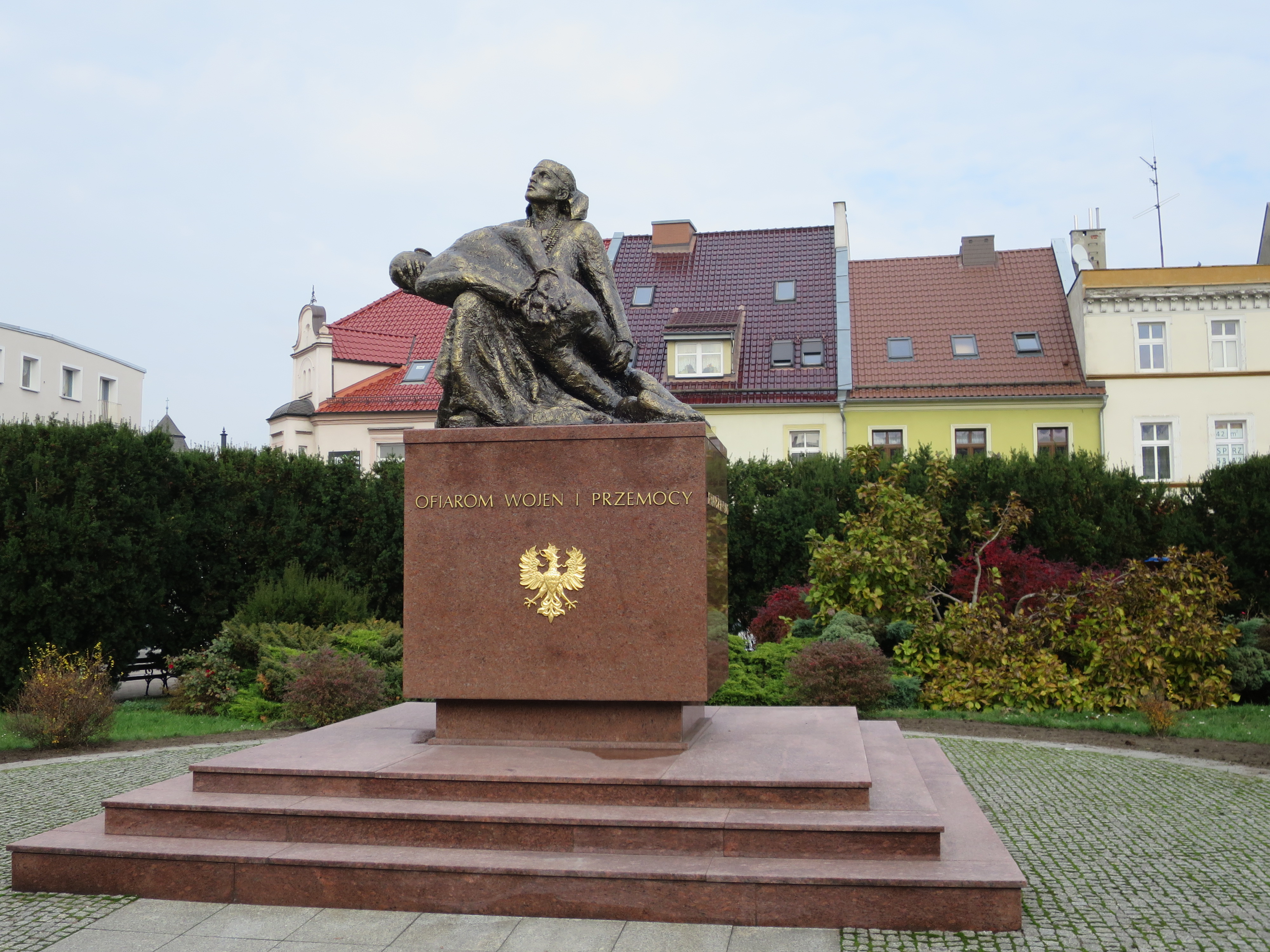
Monument to the victims of wars

== See also ==
- Strzelce Opolskie Castle
- Strzelce Opolskie railway station
