= Strzelce Opolskie Castle =

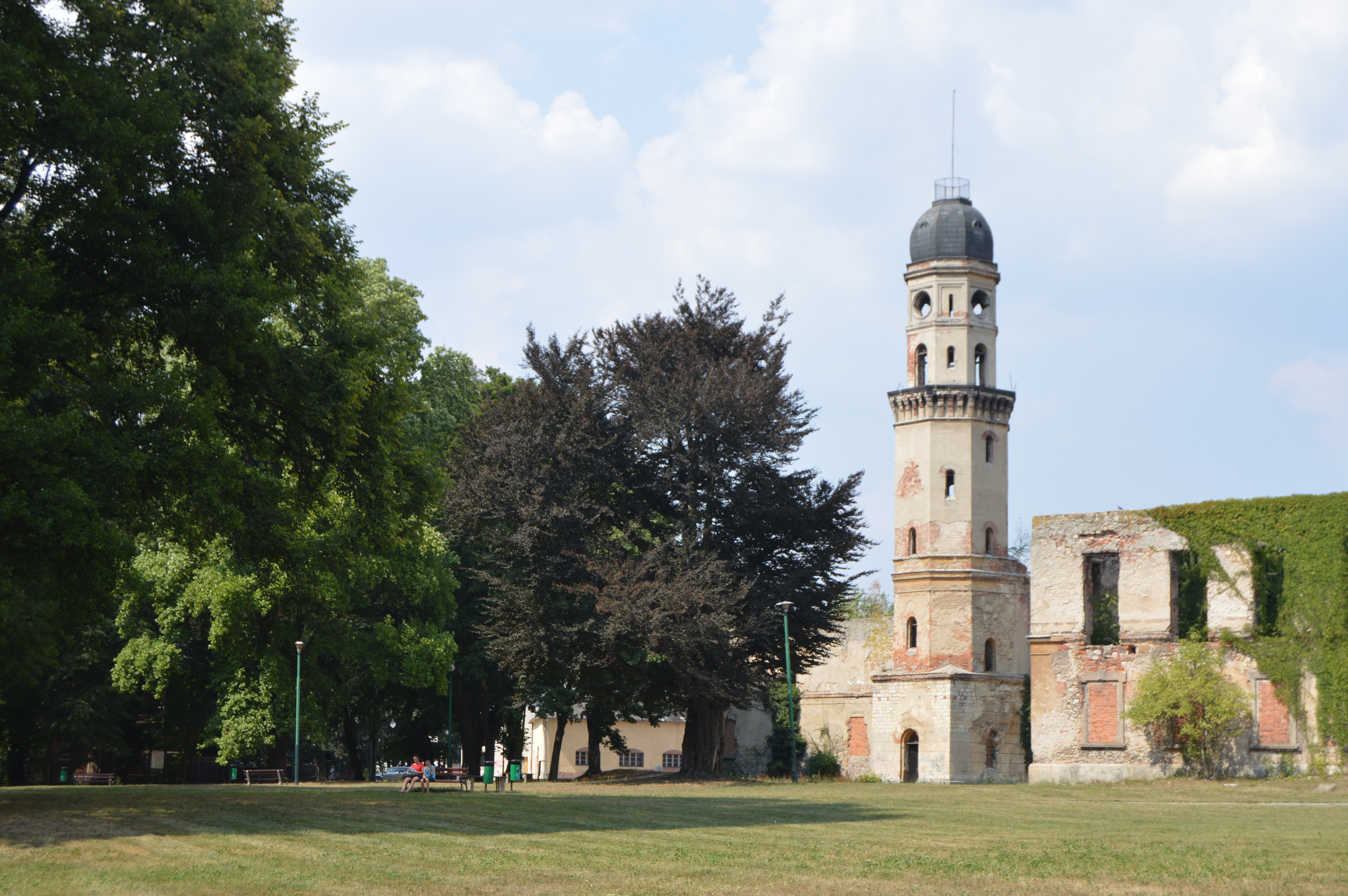
- Strzelce Opolskie Castle from the municipal park

- Location of the Strzelce Opolskie Castle in Poland Strzelce Opolskie Castle (Opole Voivodeship)
- 50°30′35″N 18°18′00″E
- Location: Strzelce Opolskie, Opole Voivodeship, in Poland

History
- Built: 14th century

Site notes
- Architectural style: Renaissance

Strzelce Opolskie Castle (Polish: Zamek w Strzelcach Opolskich, German: Schloss Groß Strehlitz) – a former residence of the Dukes of Opole located in Strzelce Opolskie, Poland. The castle was burned down during World War II by the Soviets and remains in ruins to this day.

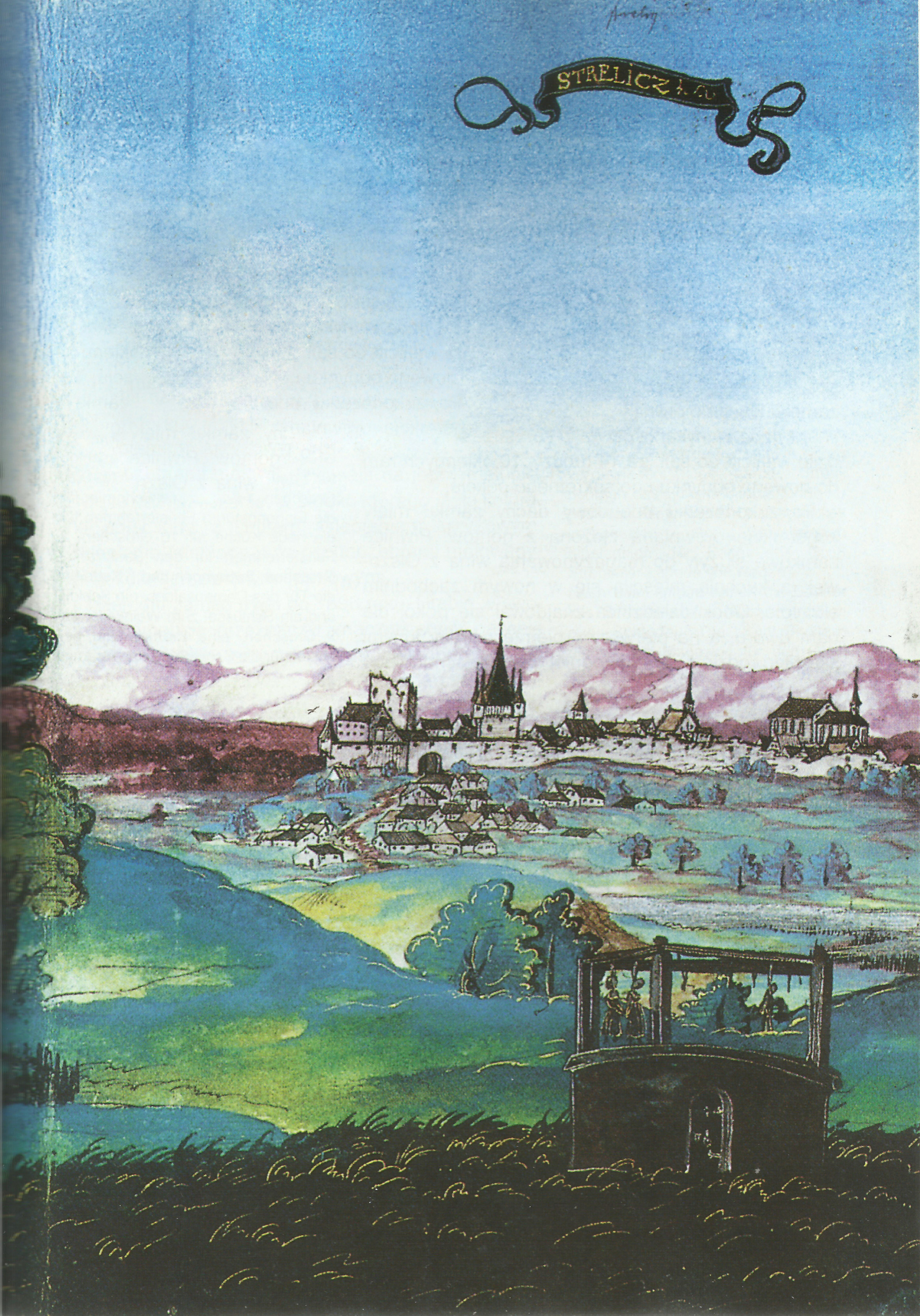
Drawing from 1536 showing the original castle in poor condition, lacking roof

The town of Strzelce Opolskie was situated on the trade route Kraków–Wrocław–Dresden. The settlement was initially surrounded by a thick forest. An original wooden hunting lodge was probably replaced by a stone structure in the 13th century. The castle was first mentioned in Liber fundationis episcopatus Vratislaviensis as Castrum Strelecense. The document is believed to be compiled in 1305.

The castle was built on a simple rectangular plan measuring 16,1 x 13,9 m and was, in fact, a limestone tower. In 1323 Albert became the duke of an independent Duchy of Strzelce/Strehlitz. He carried out extensive renovations to the castle and built a series of fortifications and a moat around it. After his death the castle and the duchy was taken over by the Piasts of Niemodlin and after the extinction of the line in 1382 it was passed to the Piasts of Opole. The dynasty owned the castle up to its extinction in 1532.

In the first half of the 16th century the castle was in very poor condition. From 1562 to 1596 major renovation works were carried out. From the middle of the 17th century to the beginning of the 19th century it was in hands of the Colonna family. The castle's heyday came after 1815 when Andreas Renard took its ownership and made it his main residence. An English-style landscape park was created in 1832. In 1840 Andreas Renard extended and remodelled the palace adding an adjacent tower and building horse stables near the west wing.

From 1932 to 1945 the palace was possessed by the Castell family. On 21 January 1945 Soviet troops set the town and castle on fire. The building remains in ruins to this day.

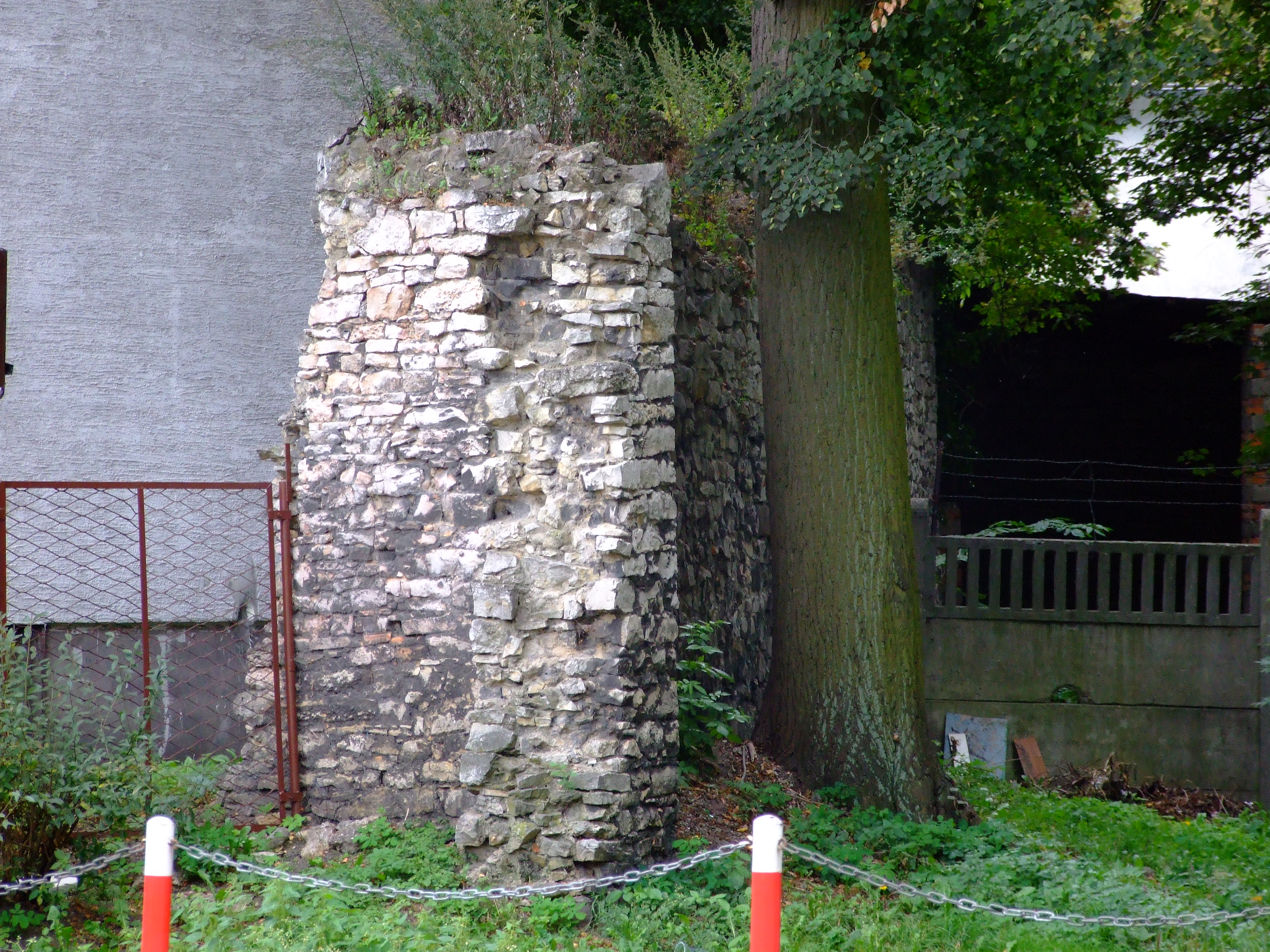
Remnants of the defensive town wall

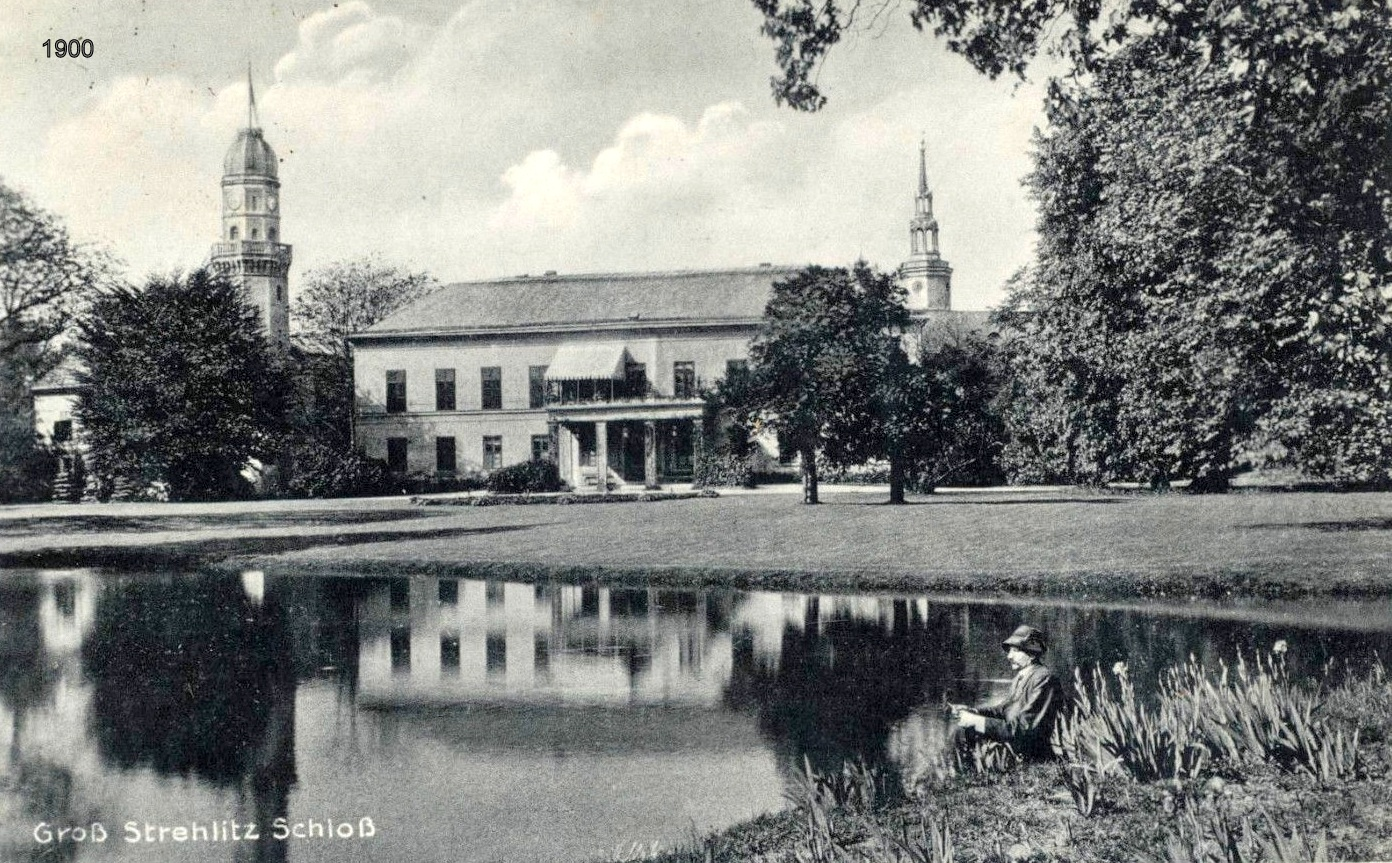
Strzelce Opolskie Castle, c. 1900

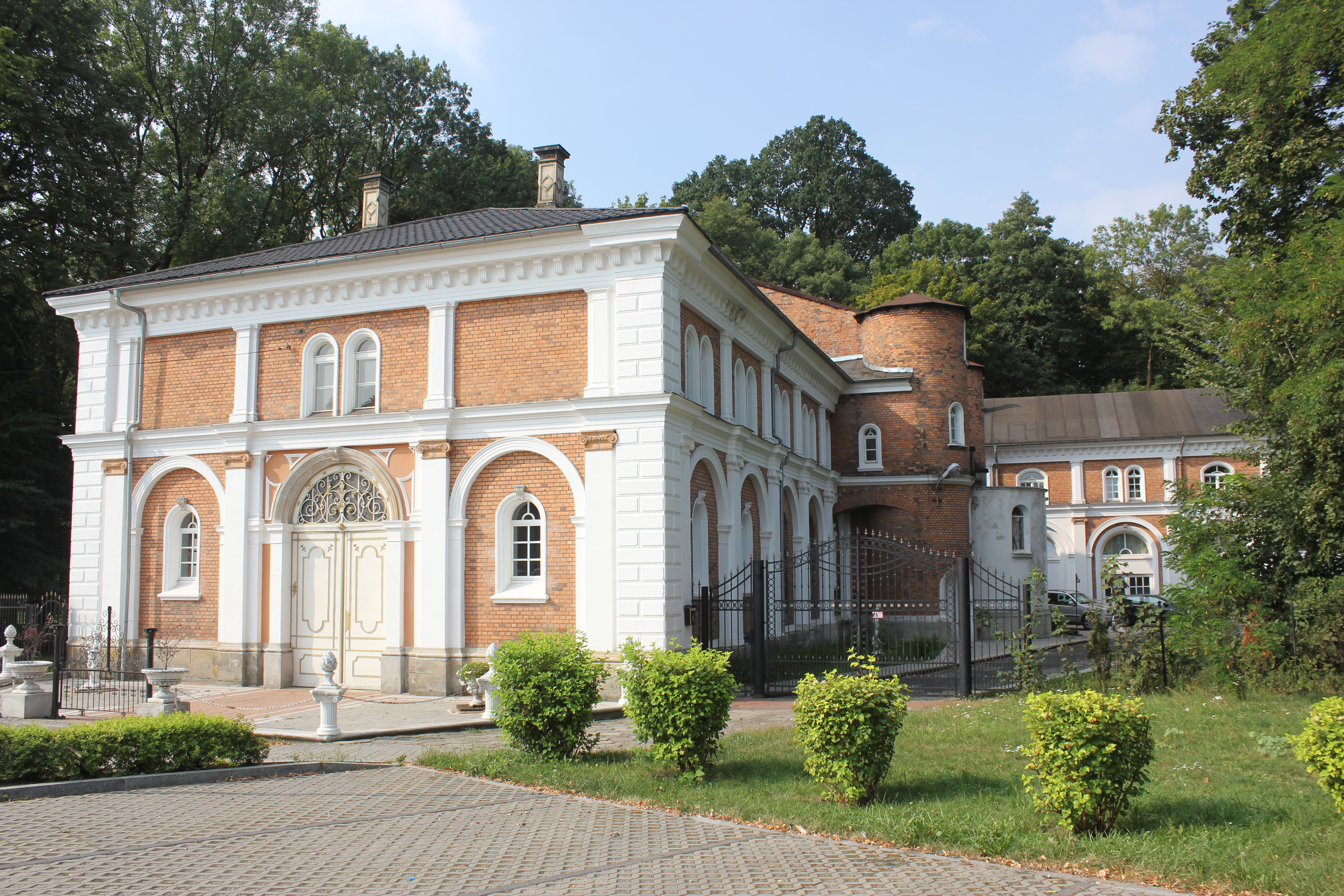
Horse stables called Masztalarnia

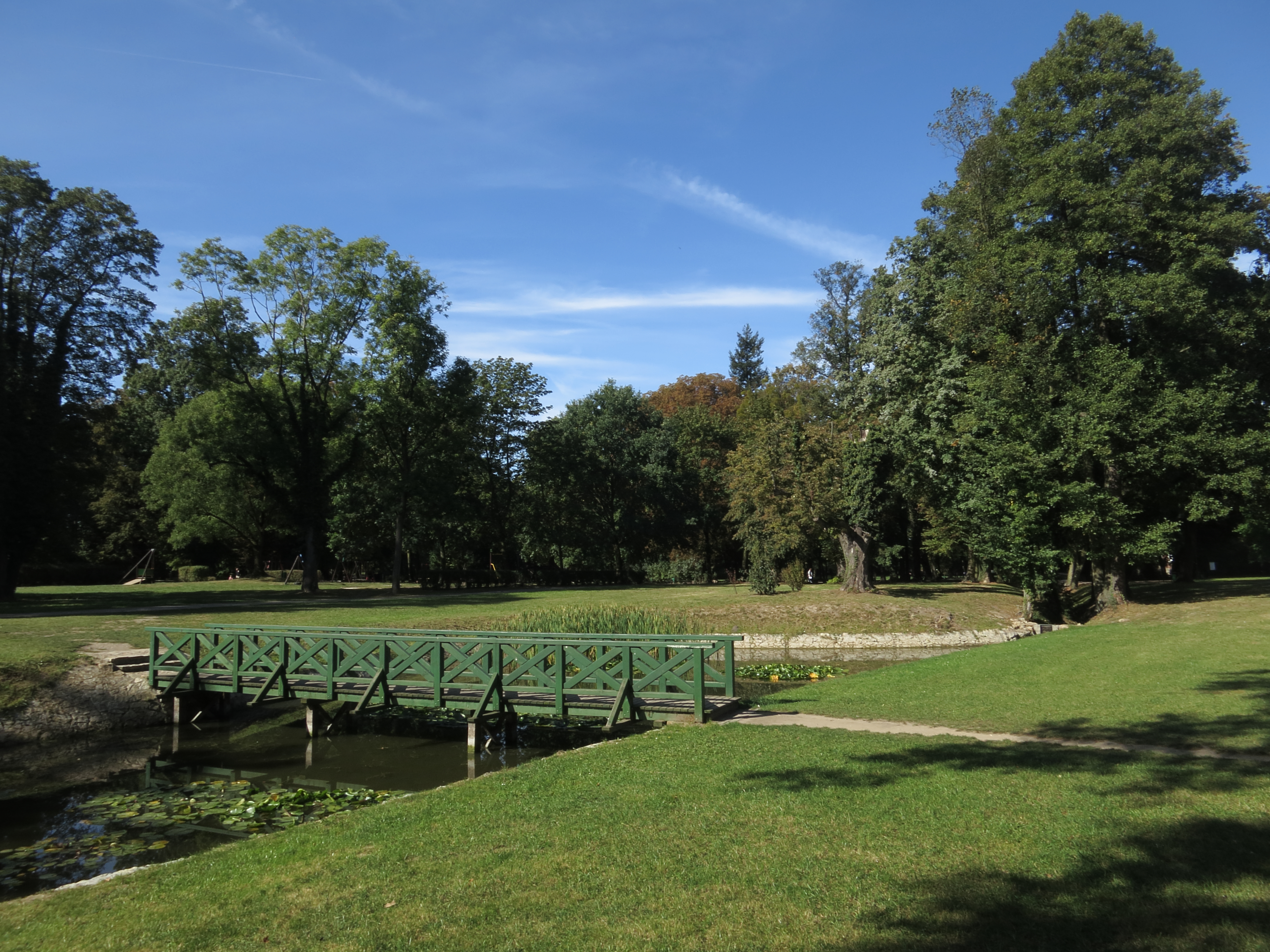
Park in front of the castle
