= Polen-rundschau =

Polen-rundschau is the first and only German language newspaper published countrywide in Poland since the Second World War. It has been published from the Polish capital Warsaw monthly since April 2004. It is printed in colour on twelve to 16 pages, in tabloid format. The paper is not under the influence of any organisation, like political parties and associations. That and its countrywide circulation set it apart from other German language newspapers in Poland, which tend to be owned and published by the parties and associations of the German minority in Poland. It is financed exclusively through advertising and subscription fees.

The paper's target group are mainly Germans living in Poland and Poles who take an interest in Germany and the German language and culture. As a service to the German readers there are regular lessons about Poland and Polish culture. The topical range includes everything from politics, latest news, economy and business to culture, current affairs, sports and an events calendar as well as many service sections destined to provide assistance to newly arrived Germans in getting acquainted with the country. The paper puts a special focus on the background of German-Polish relations. Depending on the flow of events, the papers' webpage offers additional daily or weekly news. Upon publication of the current issue, the headline (usually consisting of the leading article), can be found on the web. The editor-in-chief, Mirko Kaupat and freelance business journalist Sebastian Becker regularly contribute content. Apart from that, most articles are written by different freelancers, among others, members of the "n-ost" research network, an association of journalists who predominantly reside in Eastern Europe. Berlin-based layouter Emese Szénás is responsible for the visual appearance of polen-rundschau. Starting summer 2006, the paper has a permanent correspondent in Germany, in the person of Heiko Lossie. Notable guest authors include Thomas Urban, Eastern European correspondent of Süddeutsche Zeitung.

Both German and Polish media have repeatedly quoted from the exclusive interviews appearing in the monthly, with public figures such as Erika Steinbach, Władysław Bartoszewski, Gesine Schwan and Rudi Pawelka.

In April 2006, polen-rundschau gained widespread attention when it auctioned itself off on eBay. An undisclosed bidder from Germany acquired the paper. It is however still based in Warsaw. The March 2008 issue was the last printed one. Since then, polen-rundschau has been published exclusively in electronic form. The paper characterised this change as not simply a financial necessity, but a move carrying the additional advantage of ensuring swift delivery of the current issue to subscribers, who had often complained that it took the issue two weeks, counting from publication, to reach them by mail. Due to the reduced costs of this procedure, the annual subscription fee was lowered to € 10.

Editor-in-chief
Mirko Kaupat
Publisher
New Press Polska
