= German Socio-Cultural Organisation in Wrocław =

Association of the Polish-German minority

The German Socio-Cultural Organisation in Wrocław (German: Deutsche Sozial-Kulturelle Gesellschaft in Breslau, DSKG Breslau; Polish: Niemieckie Towarzystwo Kulturalno-Społeczne we Wrocławiu, NTKS Wrocław) is an organisation of the German minority in the Lower Silesian Voivodeship. It has its seat in Wrocław and is a member of the Association of the German Socio-Cultural Organisations in Poland. It has about 1500 members, and its current chairwoman is Krystyna Kadlewicz.

The organisation was established in 1991 following the fall of communism in Poland as a successor to the German Social and Cultural Society, which was established in 1957 and officially disbanded in 1981 following the declaration of martial law in Poland. Its purpose is to promote German language, customs, and culture among ethnic Germans in the city.

In order to qualify for standard membership in DSKG Breslau, a person must be an ethnic German, defined by the organisation as a person who has at least one documented German grandparent.
