= Suzanna von Nathusius =

Polish television actor (born 2000)

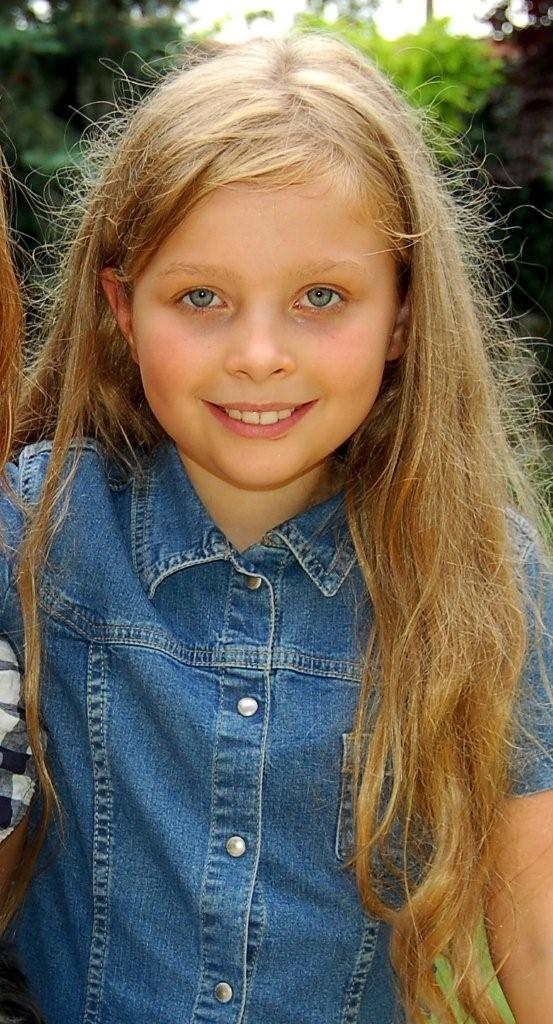
- Suzanna von Nathusius, 2008
- Born: 12 April 2000 (age 26); Warsaw, Poland

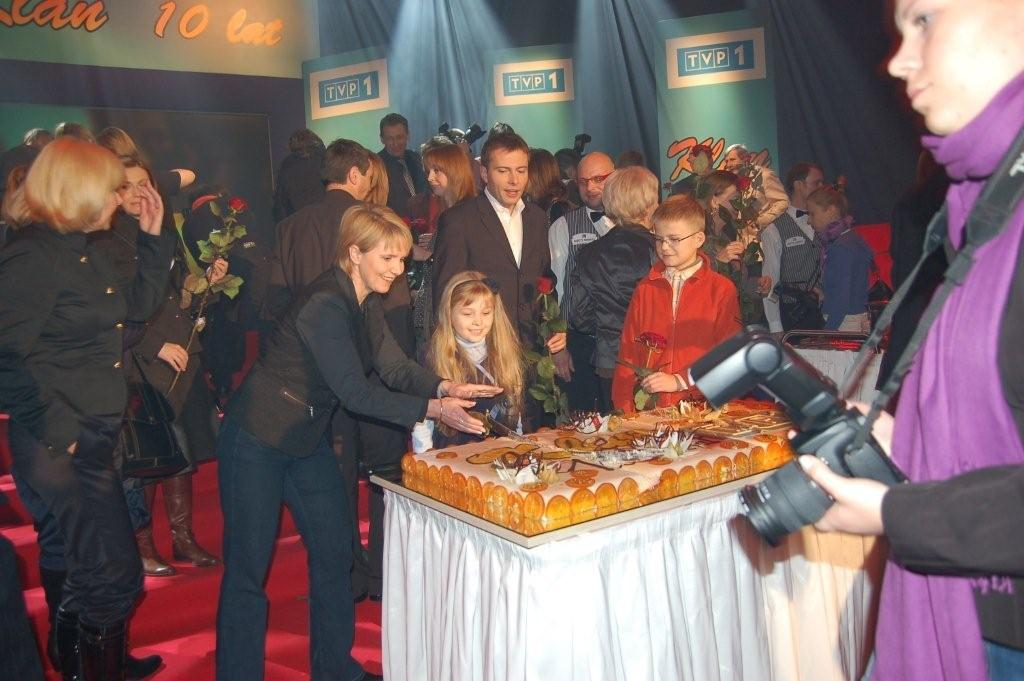
Suzanna von Nathusius cutting the cake at 10 years' anniversary of Polish soap opera Klan. 14 November 2007

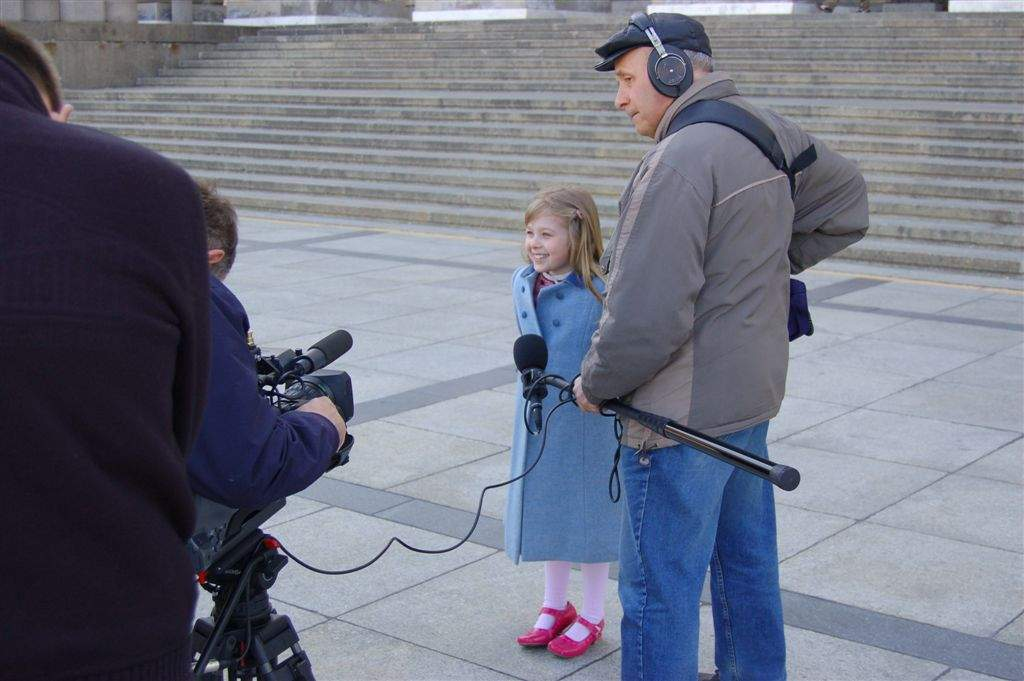
Suzanna von Nathusius got interviewed for news report Panorama (at TVP 2). 22 April 2007

Suzanna von Nathusius (born 12 April 2000) is a Polish television actor of German origin.

== Career ==
At the age of three, Nathusius was cast for TV commercials. At the age of seven, she made her film debut in the BBC documentary film series Auschwitz: The Nazis and the 'Final Solution'. She has taken part in many commercials (TV, billboard, print), including the longtime multimedia campaign Orange Go in 2005. In February 2004, she played the Małgorzata (Małgosia) Borecka for the first time in Poland's oldest soap-opera Klan (broadcast since 1997 by public station TVP1), currently the third most popular soap opera in Poland. At her 5th (Klan-) anniversary in February 2009, she had already appeared in 160 episodes. Since 2006, she has also played minor roles in other TV series and films.

=== Filmography ===
- Klan, (2004-2013) as Małgorzata Borecka (soap opera, TVP1)
- Kryminalni, (1 episode, 2006) as girl in the shop (crime series, TVN)
- Hela w opałach (2006) (comedy, TVN)
- Plebania, (2 episodes, 2007-2008) as Maria (soap opera, TVP1)
- Kryminalni, (1 episode, 2008) as victims' daughter (crime series, TVN)
- Niech żyje pogrzeb(2008) as daughter (cinema movie)

=== Other television activities ===
- 2005: Dziecięce Aktorki, interview, 17 March 2005 (lifestyle show, TVN Style)
- 2005: Familiada, 15 May 2005 (quiz show, TVP2)
- 2005: Kawa czy herbata?, November 2005 (breakfast TV, TVP1)
- 2007: Panorama, 22 April 2007 (news, TVP 2)
- 2007: Jubileusz 10-lecie Klanu, 14 November 2007 (special, TVP1)
- 2008: Dzień Dobry TVN, 21 January 2008 (breakfast TV, TVN)
- 2008: Festival Filmu Płocku, 22 June 2008 (film festival, TVP1)
- 2008: Red Light, 10 September 2008 (TVN7)
- 2008: Dzień Otwarty TVP, 14 September 2008 (festival, TVP1, TVP2, TVP3, TVP Polonia)
- 2009: Rozmowy w Toku, 28 April 2009 (talk show, TVN)
- 2010: Kawa czy herbata?, 1 June 2010, Dzień Dziecka, (breakfast TV, TVP1)

== Biography ==
Nathusius is the third child of a German publisher and his Polish wife. She has both German and Polish citizenship and is attending a Catholic school in Warsaw.
