= Academy of Foreign Trade in Lwów =

Coordinates: 49.836752°N 24.032702°E

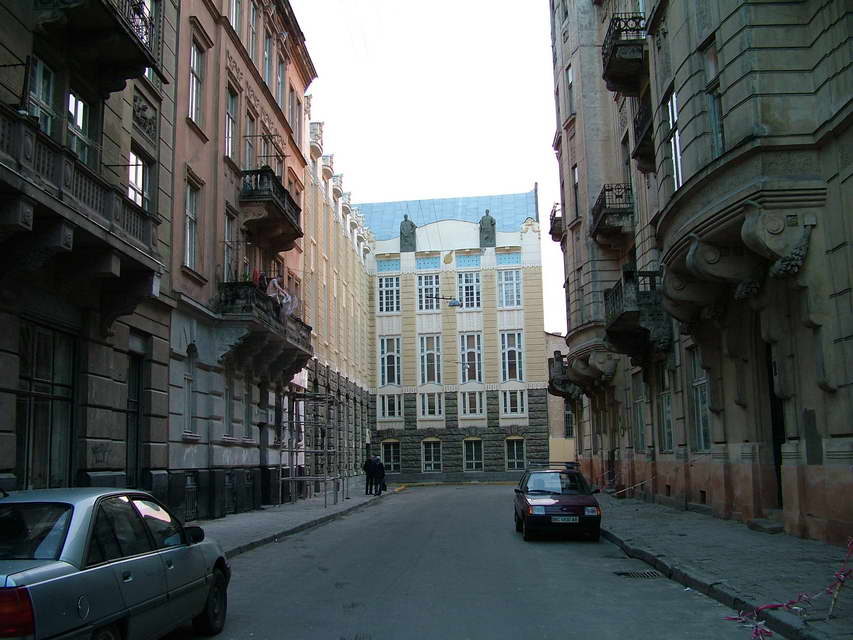
Main building of the Academy

Academy of Foreign Trade in Lwów (Polish: Akademia Handlu Zagranicznego we Lwowie, AHZ) was one of four colleges in the city of Lwów in the interbellum period, when it belonged to the Second Polish Republic (now Lviv, Ukraine). It existed between the years 1937-1939 and was based on the Foreign Trade College (Wyższa Szkola Handlu Zagranicznego), active from 1922 till 1937.

First trade college in the city of Lwów was a 3-year, state-sponsored school, founded in 1817 and which in 1845 was named Academy of Trade. In 1875, a trade high school with Polish as the main language was opened. These institutions merged in 1922, creating the Foreign Trade College.

The Academy was based in a building constructed in the 1920s, located at 5 Bourlard Street, it also owned another building, at 10 Sakramentek Street. Its students studied foreign trade, law, geography and science of commodities. It was the only college in the Second Polish Republic which prepared its graduates for future consular services. First rector of the Academy was professor Antoni Pawlowski, followed by prof. Aleksander Doliński, prof. Henryk Korowicz and prof. Stanisław Ruziewicz. Both Korowicz and Ruziewicz were killed in the Massacre of Lviv professors. Also, specialists from both Lwów Polytechnic and the Jan Kazimierz University lectured at the Academy. The school ceased to exist in September 1939, following the joint Nazi and Soviet attack on Poland.

== Sources ==
- A. Redzik, Szkic z dziejów szkolnictwa wyższego we Lwówie, Niepodległość i Pamięć, nr 24, 2006, s. 93-109.
- R. Domaszkiewicz, Akademia Handlu Zagranicznego we Lwowie 1939–1945, [w:] Lwowskie Środowisko naukowe w latach 1939–1945. O Jakubie Karolu Parnasie, pod red. Ireny Stasiewicz - Jasiukowej, wyd. 4, Warszawa 1993, s. 99-108;
