= Henryk Korowicz =

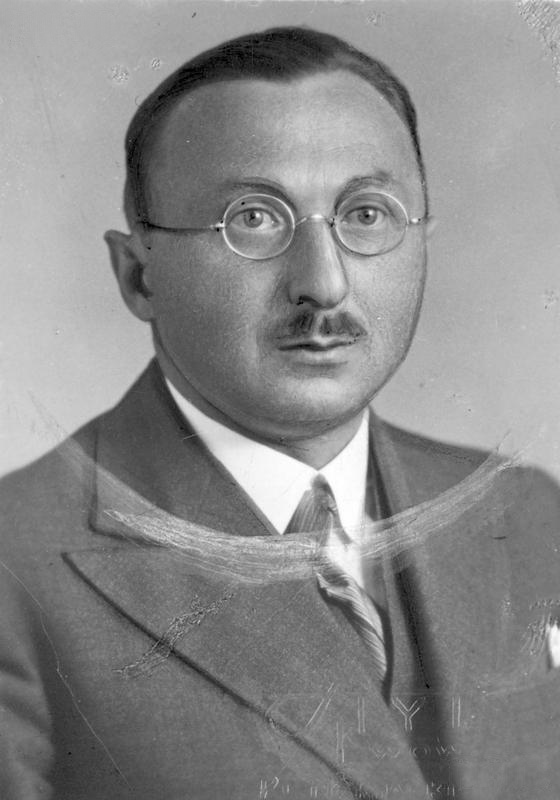
Korowicz in 1931

Henryk Korowicz (born 1888 in Malinówka – July 12, 1941 in Lwów) was a Polish economist, professor and rector of the Academy of Foreign Trade in Lwów.

== Biography ==
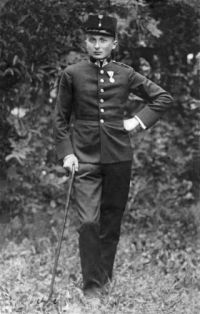
Henryk Korowicz in 1915, in the uniform of the Austro-Hungarian Army

His father was Joachim Kornreich-Korowicz (a native of Malinówka, also lived in Vienna, Kraków and Lublin, where he was murdered by German soldiers at the beginning of the First World War. He studied in Munich and Strasbourg. Before 1918, he published under the name Dr. Henryk Kornreich. During the First World War, he served as an officer in the Austro-Hungarian Army and, after Polish independence, in the Polish Army, during the Polish-Soviet War, on the Volhynia front. He worked for several years at Bank Polski in Warsaw. After his marriage to Olga Pawłowska, a colleague and noblewoman from Bukovina, he lived in Lwów.

From 1924, he lectured (subjects included treasury finance, banking policy, and social insurance) at the Academy of Foreign Trade in Lwów. From 1927, he worked there as associate professor, from 1931 as full professor, and, in addition, from 1931–1939, he was the rector. He continued to lecture during the Soviet occupation of Lwów (1939–1941), when the Academy of Foreign Trade was transformed into the Lwów State Institute of Soviet Trade.

On July 11, 1941, he was arrested by the Gestapo, and murdered, probably the following day, in what became known as the Massacre of Lwów professors.

He had one son, Wojciech Antoni Korowicz (born 1926), who, after the death of his father, joined the Home Army, during winter 1943/44. He served in the 14th Regiment of Jazlowiec Uhlans, under Dragan Sotirovic – Draża. He fought in Operation Tempest in Lwów, and, later, on the San River. In July 1945, together with soldiers of the 14th Regiment, he managed to reach Italy, where his unit was incorporated into the II Corp. He emigrated to England, and later to Ireland.

Henryk’s brother was Marek S. Korowicz, Professor of International Law.

== Sources ==
- Jan Draus - Uniwersytet Jana Kazimierza we Lwowie 1918-1946. Portret kresowej uczelni
- Information from grandson, Jonathan Korowicz
