= Grabow (disambiguation) =

Grabow is a town in Mecklenburg-Vorpommern in north-eastern Germany.

Grabów is a town in Łódź Voivodeship in central Poland.

Grabow may also refer to other placenames derived from grab, the Slavic word for hornbeam:

== Places in Germany ==
- Grabow (Amt) an Amt in the district of Ludwigslust, Mecklenburg-Vorpommern
- Grabow (bodden), a body of water off the Baltic Sea, on the coast of Mecklenburg-Vorpommern
- Grabow-Below, a municipality in Müritz district, Mecklenburg-Vorpommern
- Grabow, Saxony-Anhalt

== Places in Poland ==
- Grabów nad Prosną, a town in western Poland
- Grabów, Łęczyca County, a town in Łódź Voivodeship (central Poland)
- Grabów, Kutno County, a village in Łódź Voivodeship (central Poland)
- Grabów, Sulęcin County, a village in Lubusz Voivodeship (west Poland)
- Grabów, Żary County, a village in Lubusz Voivodeship (west Poland)
- Grabów, Warsaw, a neighbourhood of Warsaw, a city in Masovian Voivodeship (east-central Poland)
- Grabów, Wołomin County, a village in Masovian Voivodeship (east-central Poland)
- Grabów, Opole Voivodeship, a village in south-west Poland
- Grabów, Silesian Voivodeship, a village in south Poland
- Grabowa (river) (German: Grabow), a river in Pomerania, northern Poland

== In the United States ==
- Graybow or Grabow, Louisiana, predecessor of the Beauregard Regional Airport
- Grabow riot, a violent labour dispute that took place in Louisiana in 1912

== People ==
- Amy Grabow (born 1979), American actress
- Carl Grabow (1790–1859), German entomologist
- Guido Grabow (born 1959), German rower
- John Grabow (born 1978), American Major League Baseball pitcher
- Mathilda Grabow (1852–1940), Swedish opera singer
- Paul Grabow, American slalom canoeist
- Volker Grabow (born 1956), German rower
- Wilhelm Grabow (1802–1874), Prussian civil servant, judge, and politician

== See also ==
- Grabouw, Western Cape, South Africa
