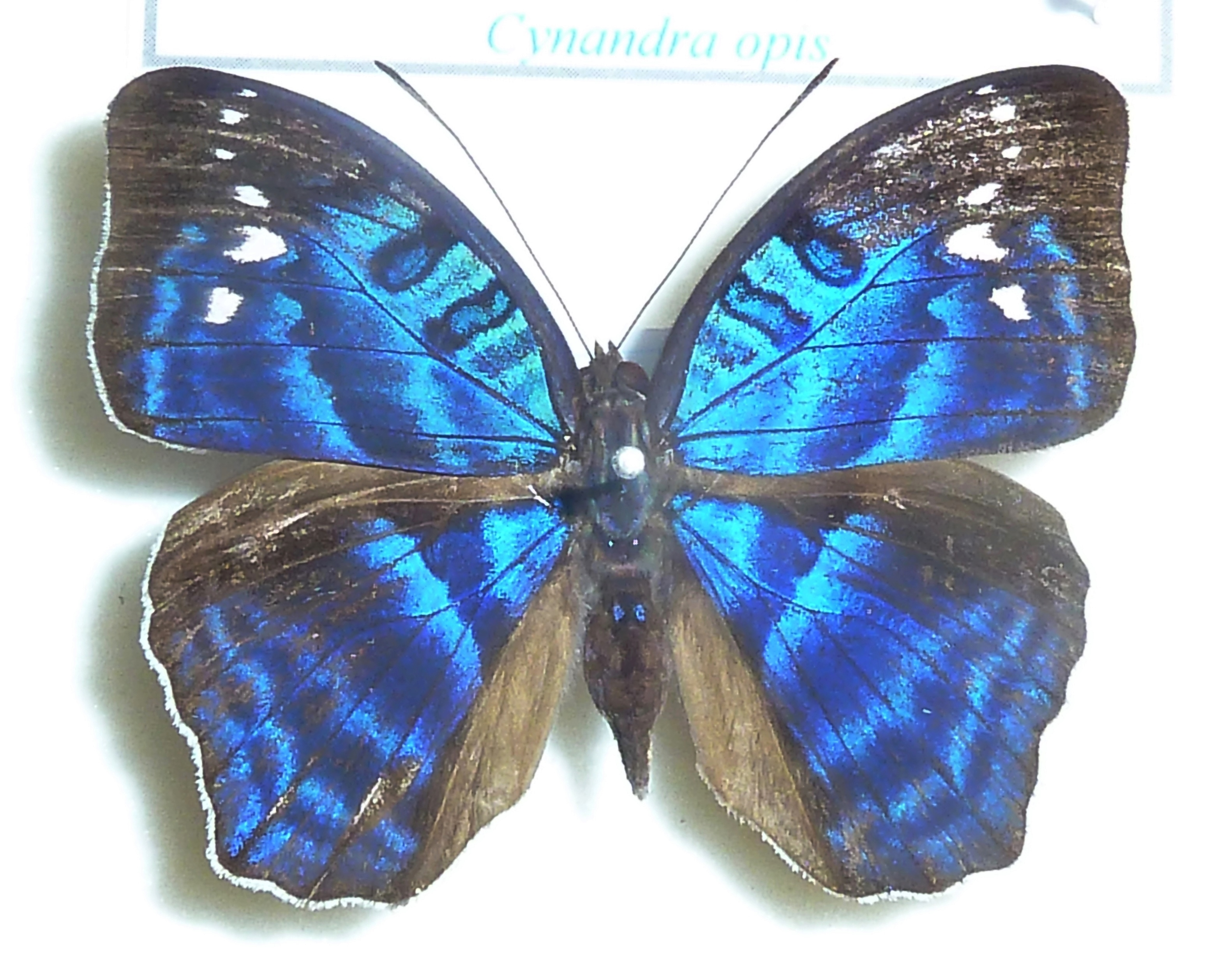
- Male

Scientific classification
- Kingdom: Animalia
- Phylum: Arthropoda
- Clade: Pancrustacea
- Class: Insecta
- Order: Lepidoptera
- Family: Nymphalidae
- Genus: Cynandra; Schatz, [1887]
- Species: C. opis

Binomial name
- Cynandra opis (Drury, 1773)

Synonyms
- Papilio opis Drury, 1773; Papilio afer Drury, 1782; Papilio aethiopa Fabricius, 1793

= Cynandra =

Brilliant nymph

Monotypic brush-footed butterfly genus

Cynandra opis, the brilliant nymph, is a butterfly in the family Nymphalidae. It is the only species in the monotypic genus Cynandra. It is found in Guinea, Sierra Leone, Liberia, Ivory Coast, Ghana, Togo, Nigeria, Cameroon, Gabon, the Republic of the Congo, the Central African Republic, Angola, the Democratic Republic of the Congo, Uganda and Tanzania. The habitat consists of dense forests.

The larvae feed on Dissotis species.

== Description ==
Upperside: antennae brown. Head, thorax, and abdomen brown. Wings dark brown or chocolate colour, formed into divisions by lines of a yellowish colour crossing and intersecting them in various directions. A yellow bar rises on the anterior wings, near the middle, and crossing them and the posterior, meets at the extremity of the body. Close to where the bar rises on the anterior wings are six very small white spots, placed between the nerves, reaching to the anterior edges.

Underside: palpi, breast, and sides greyish brown. Anterior wings greyish, clouded with red brown, particularly at the tips; on the middle of the external edges is a patch of yellow, and on the middle of the posterior edges is a patch of a pale clay colour, with six small white spots. Posterior wings having a third part, next the shoulders, greyish and dark brown; the remainder pale clay, with a reddish-brown patch next the upper corners; from whence runs an undulated brown line to the abdominal edges at the extremity of the body, and another fainter along the external edges. The wings are dentated (tooth like).

Wingspan 2 1/2 inches (64 mm).

== Subspecies ==
- Cynandra opis opis (Guinea, Sierra Leone, Liberia, Ivory Coast, Ghana, Togo, Nigeria, western Cameroon)
- Cynandra opis bernardii Lagnel, 1967 (Cameroon, Gabon, Congo, Central African Republic, Angola, Democratic Republic of the Congo, Uganda, north-western Tanzania)

Torben Larsen developed a species numbering system for his 2005 publication Butterflies of West Africa. The nominate subspecies is #954. The 'Larsen' numbers have since been used with permission in A Sharp Eye on Butterflies of Ghana.

== Gallery ==
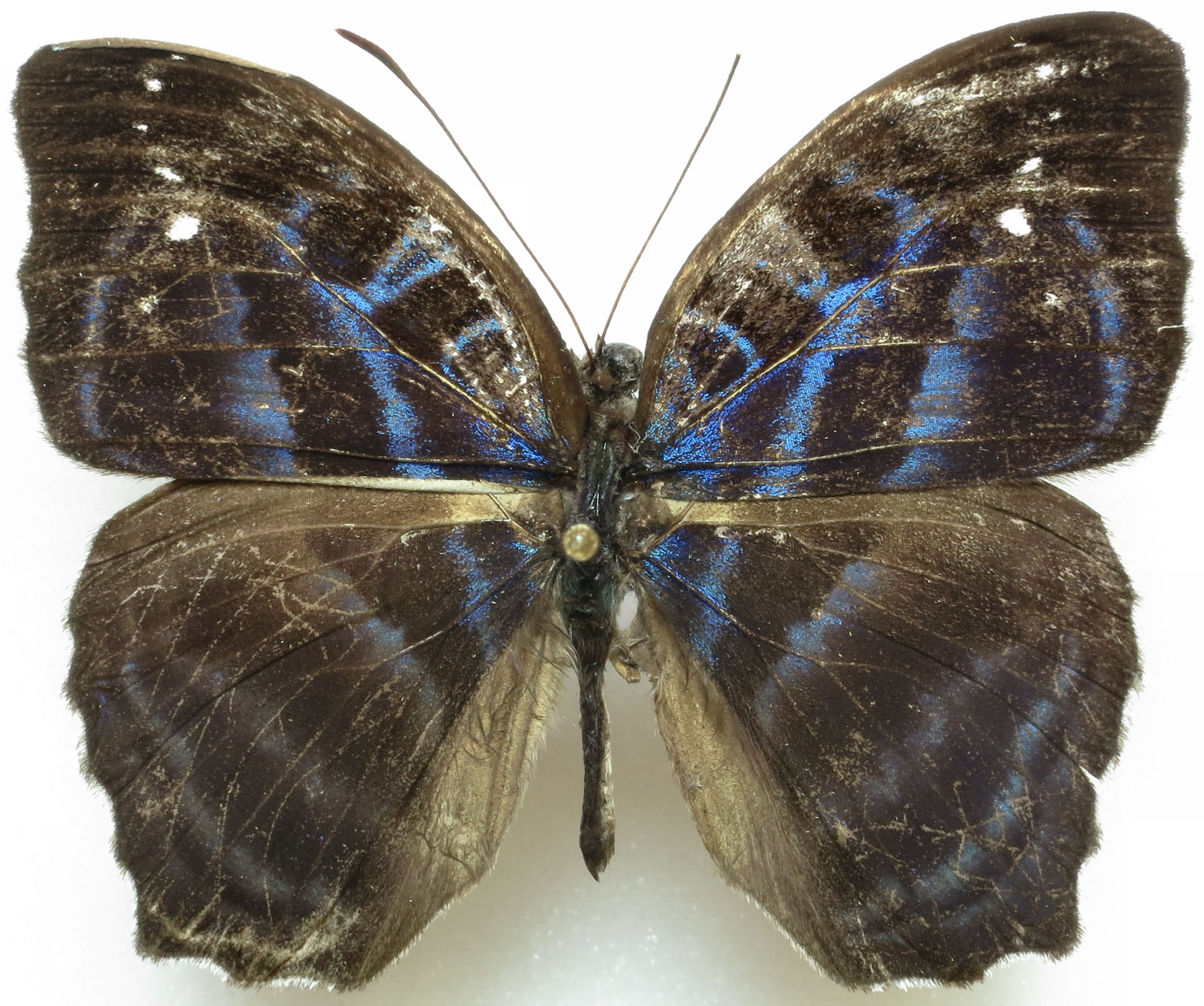
C. opis bernardii male

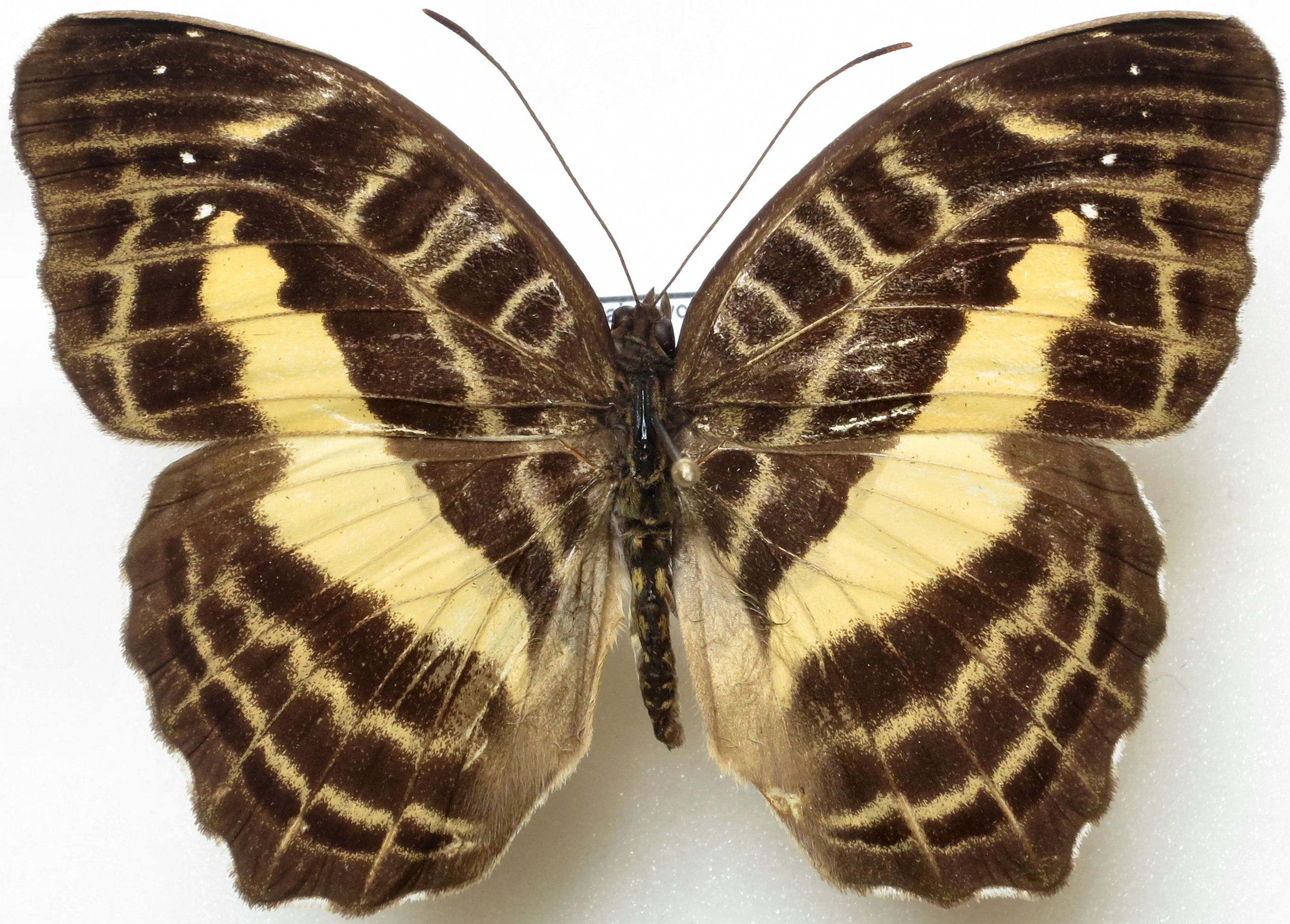
C. opis bernardii female
