= Otmice =

Otmice Ottmütz
- Village
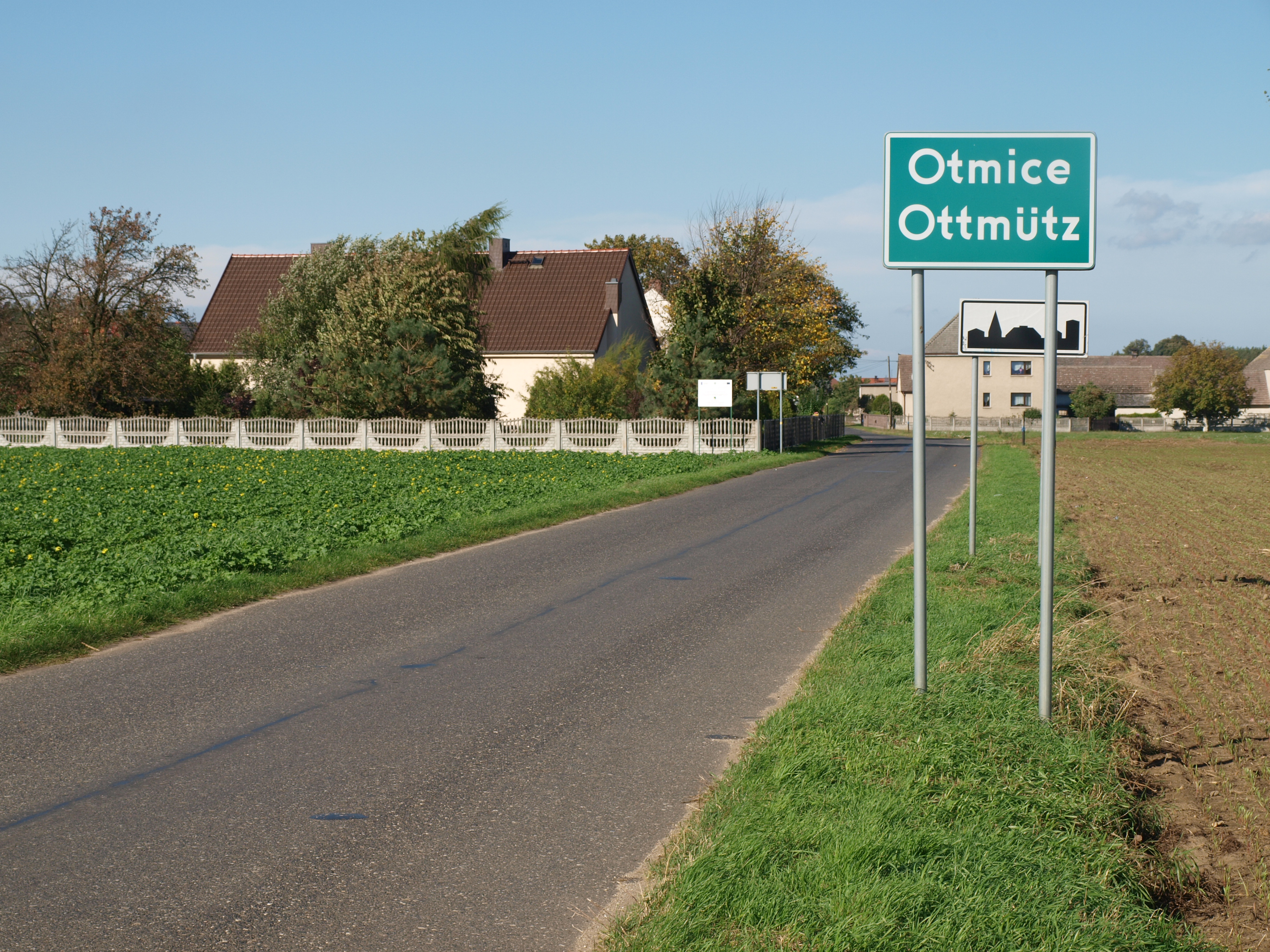

- Location within Poland
- Coordinates: 50°33′N 18°9′E
- Country: Poland
- Voivodeship: Opole
- County: Strzelce
- Gmina: Izbicko
- Population: 1,114
- Time zone: UTC+1 (CET)
  - Summer (DST): UTC+2 (CEST)
- Vehicle registration: OST

Otmice ([ɔtˈmit͡sɛ], additional name in German: Ottmütz) is a village in the administrative district of Gmina Izbicko, within Strzelce County, Opole Voivodeship, in southern Poland.

== History ==
According to linguist Heinrich Adamy the name is of Polish origin, and comes from the word odmęt. In the 10th century the area became part of the emerging Polish state, and later on, it was part of Poland, Bohemia (Czechia), Prussia, and Germany. It was the site of fights during the Polish Third Silesian Uprising against Germany in 1921. During World War II, the Germans operated the E56 forced labour subcamp of the Stalag VIII-B/344 prisoner-of-war camp in the village. After the defeat of Germany in the war, in 1945, the village became again part of Poland.
