= Massow =

- Ortsteil of Eldetal
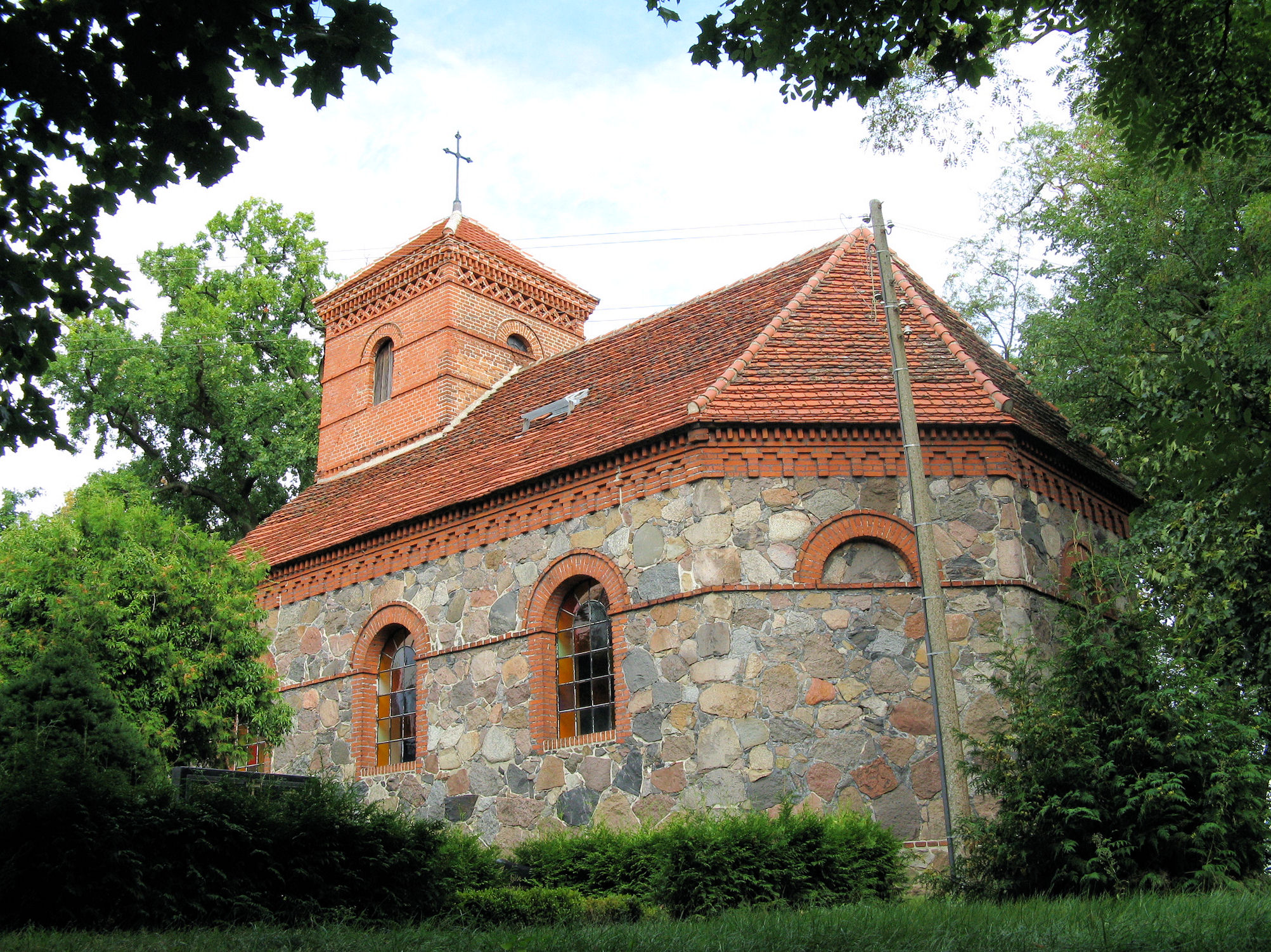
- Church in the village
- Interactive map of Massow
- Location within Germany Location within Mecklenburg-Vorpommern
- Coordinates: 53°19′00″N 12°25′00″E
- Country: Germany
- State: Mecklenburg-Vorpommern
- District: Mecklenburgische Seenplatte
- Municipality: Eldetal

Area
  - Total: 17.43 km^{2} (6.73 sq mi)
- Elevation: 76 m (249 ft)

Population (2017-12-31)
  - Total: 190
  - Density: 11/km^{2} (28/sq mi)
- Time zone: UTC+01:00 (CET)
  - Summer (DST): UTC+02:00 (CEST)
- Postal codes: 17209
- Dialling codes: 039925
- Vehicle registration: MÜR
- Website: www.amt-roebel- mueritz.de

Massow is a village and a former municipality in the Mecklenburgische Seenplatte district, in Mecklenburg-Vorpommern, Germany. Since May 2019, it is part of the new municipality Eldetal.
