= Borycz =

Borycz Boritsch
- Village
- Location within Poland
- Coordinates: 50°36′33″N 18°12′33″E
- Country: Poland
- Voivodeship: Opole
- County: Strzelce
- Gmina: Izbicko
- Time zone: UTC+1 (CET)
  - Summer (DST): UTC+2 (CEST)
- Vehicle registration: OST

Borycz ([ˈbɔrɨt͡ʂ], additional name in German: Boritsch) is a village in the administrative district of Gmina Izbicko, within Strzelce County, Opole Voivodeship, in southern Poland.
