= Gmina Izbicko =

Gmina Izbicko Gemeinde Stubendorf Izbicko Commune
- Gmina
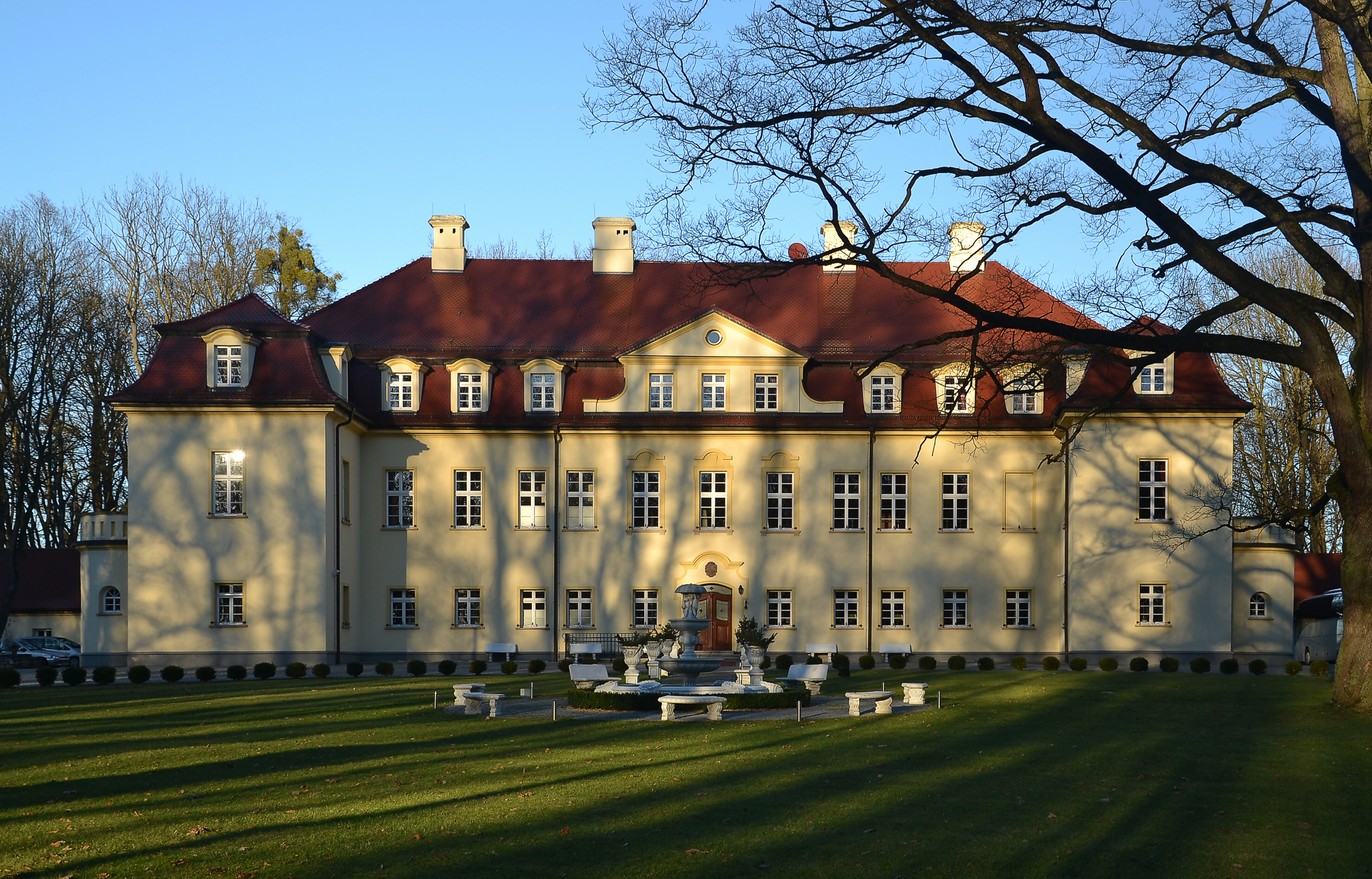
- Izbicko Palace

- Coat of arms
- Interactive map of Gmina Izbicko
- Coordinates (Izbicko): 50°35′N 18°9′E
- Country: Poland
- Voivodeship: Opole
- County: Strzelce
- Seat: Izbicko

Area
  - Total: 84.93 km^{2} (32.79 sq mi)

Population (2019-06-30)
  - Total: 5,415
  - Density: 63.76/km^{2} (165.1/sq mi)
- Time zone: UTC+1 (CET)
  - Summer (DST): UTC+2 (CEST)
- Vehicle registration: OST
- Website: http://www.izbicko.pl

Gmina Izbicko (German: Gemeinde Stubendorf) is a rural gmina (administrative district) in Strzelce County, Opole Voivodeship, in southern Poland. Its seat is the village of Izbicko, which lies approximately 14 kilometres (9 mi) north-west of Strzelce Opolskie and 18 km (11 mi) south-east of the regional capital Opole.

The gmina covers an area of 84.93 square kilometres (32.8 sq mi), and as of 2019, its total population was 5,415.

== Villages ==
Gmina Izbicko contains the villages and settlements of Borycz, Grabów, Izbicko, Krośnica, Ligota Czamborowa, Otmice, Poznowice, Siedlec, Sprzęcice, Suchodaniec and Utrata.

== Neighbouring gminas ==
Gmina Izbicko is bordered by the gminas of Chrząstowice, Gogolin, Ozimek, Strzelce Opolskie and Tarnów Opolski.

== Twin towns – sister cities ==
Gmina Izbicko is twinned with:

- Florstadt, Germany
- Götschetal (Petersberg), Germany
- Orebić, Croatia
- Osoblaha, Czech Republic
