= Eldetal =

- Municipality
- Location of Eldetal within Mecklenburgische Seenplatte district
- Interactive map of Eldetal
- Location within Germany Location within Mecklenburg-Vorpommern
- Coordinates: 53°18′N 12°28′E
- Country: Germany
- State: Mecklenburg-Vorpommern
- District: Mecklenburgische Seenplatte
- Municipal assoc.: Röbel-Müritz

Area
  - Total: 71.82 km^{2} (27.73 sq mi)
- Elevation: 68 m (223 ft)

Population (2025-12-31)
  - Total: 871
  - Density: 12.1/km^{2} (31.4/sq mi)
- Time zone: UTC+01:00 (CET)
  - Summer (DST): UTC+02:00 (CEST)
- Postal codes: 17209
- Dialling codes: 039925
- Vehicle registration: MÜR
- Website: www.amt-roebel-mueritz.de

Eldetal is a municipality in the Mecklenburgische Seenplatte district, in Mecklenburg-Vorpommern, Germany. It was created with effect from 26 May 2019 by the merger of the former municipalities of Grabow-Below, Massow, Wredenhagen and Zepkow. It takes its name from the river Elde, that flows through the municipality.
