= Krośnica, Opole Voivodeship =

Krośnica Kroschnitz
- Village
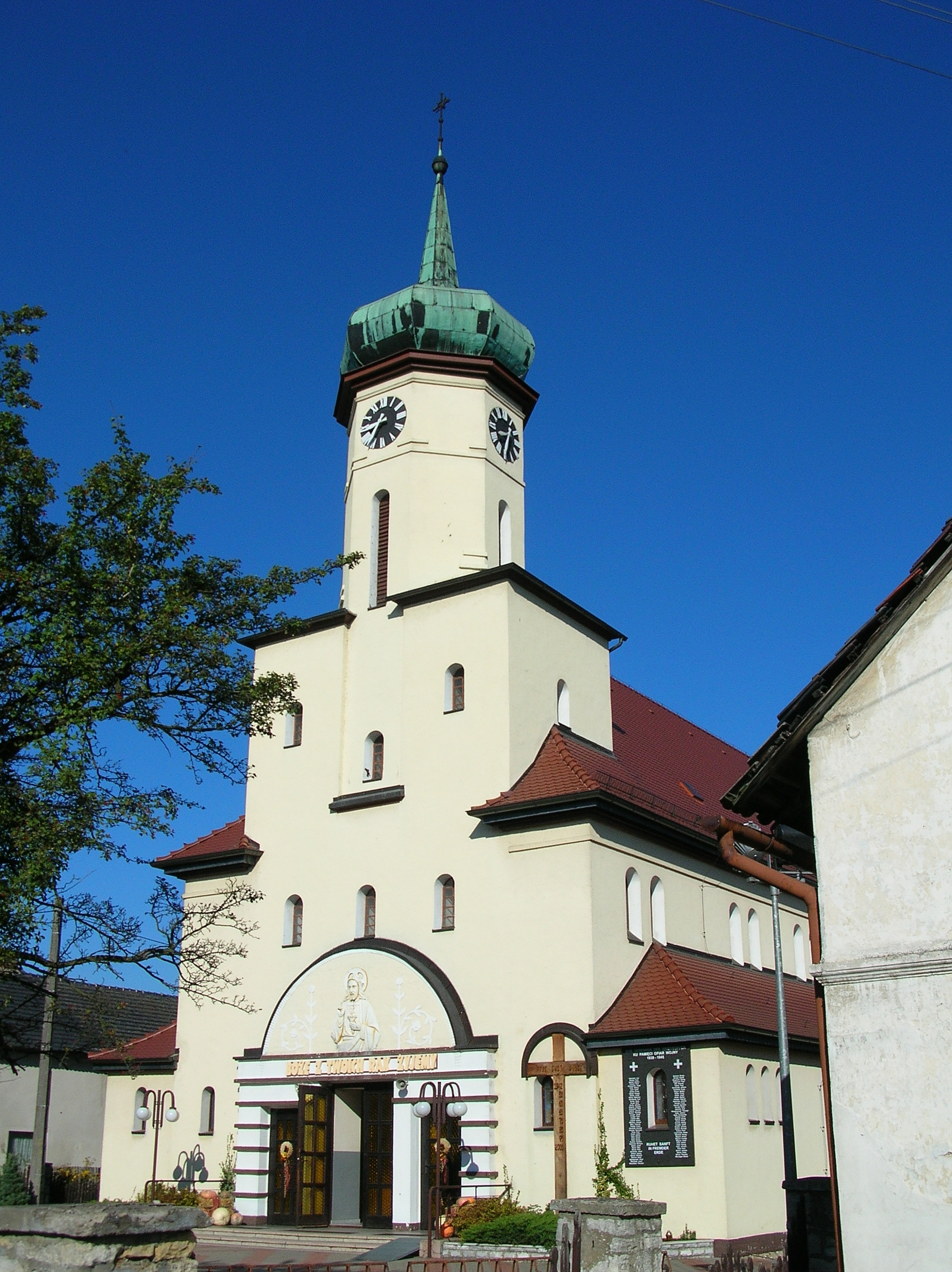
- Catholic church

- Location within Poland
- Coordinates: 50°37′N 18°11′E
- Country: Poland
- Voivodeship: Opole
- County: Strzelce
- Gmina: Izbicko
- Population: 920
- Time zone: UTC+1 (CET)
  - Summer (DST): UTC+2 (CEST)
- Vehicle registration: OST

Krośnica ([krɔɕˈnit͡sa], additional name in German: Kroschnitz) is a village in the administrative district of Gmina Izbicko, within Strzelce County, Opole Voivodeship, in southern Poland.
