= Otto Staudinger =

German entomologist and a natural history dealer

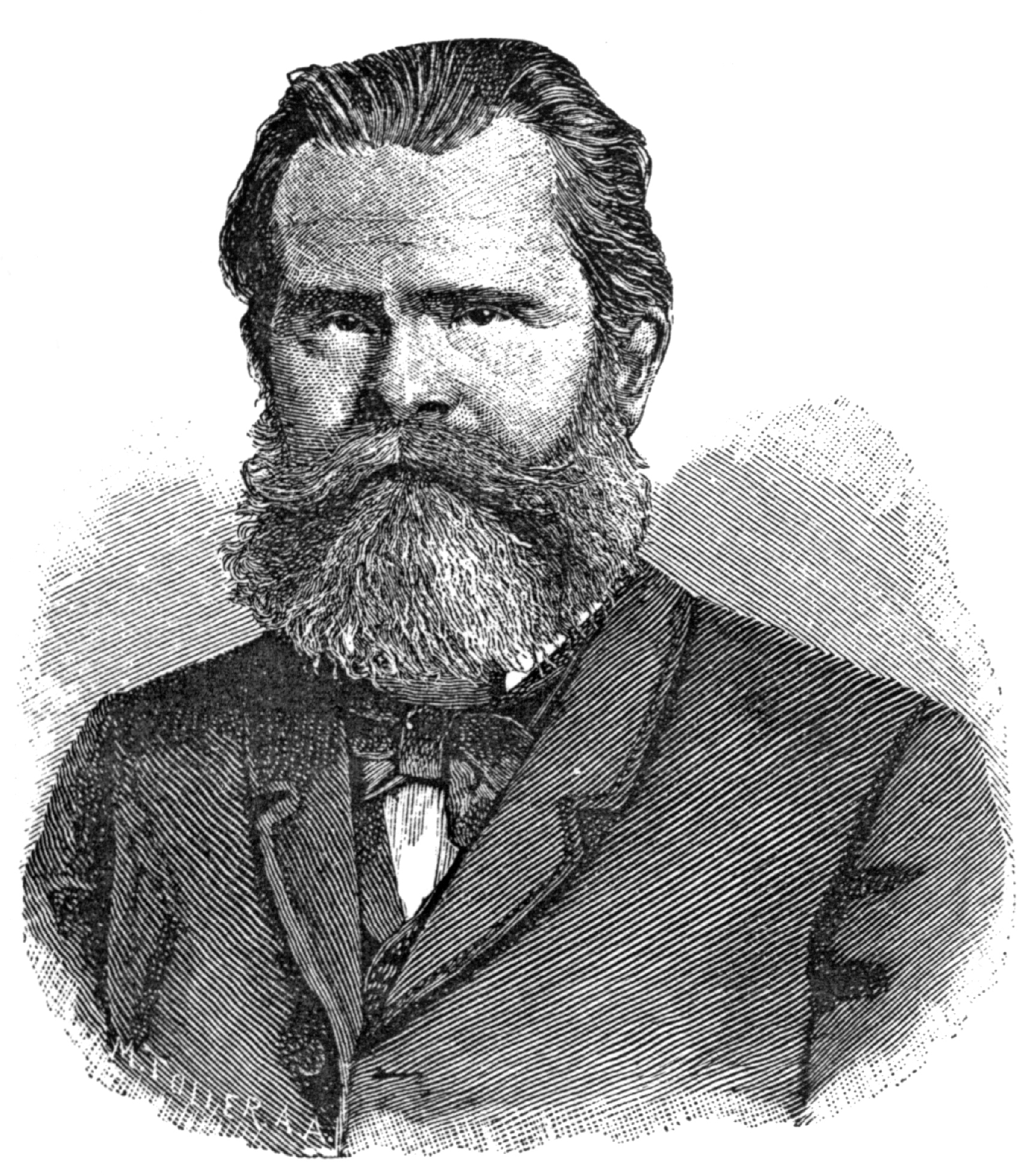
Otto Staudinger

Otto Staudinger (2 May 1830 – 13 October 1900) was a German entomologist and a natural history dealer considered one of the largest in the world specialising in the collection and sale of insects to museums, scientific institutions, and individuals.

== Life ==
Staudinger was born in Groß Wüstenfelde, Mecklenburg-Schwerin, from a Bavarian family on his father's side. His grandfather was born near Ansbach and came to Holstein at the end of the 18th century where Staudinger's father was born in Groß Flottbeck in 1799. His mother, a born Schroeder, was from Mecklenburg, born in Putzar at the Count of Schwerin's estate in 1794. At the time of Otto Staudinger's birth in 1830 his father was the tenant of the Rittergut Groß Wüstenfelde. At the age of six or seven Otto was introduced into entomology by his private tutor Wagner who collected beetles. In the summer of 1843 his father purchased the Rittergut Lübsee near Güstrow where Otto – now under the instruction of tutor Hermann – began to collect Lepidoptera. From October 1845 he attended the Gymnasium (grammar school) in Parchim and in summer 1849 received his Abitur (diploma qualifying for university admission).

In October 1849 Staudinger took up the study of medicine at the University of Berlin. In his second semester he changed to natural history under the impression of Dr. Stein's inspiring zoology lectures. From June 1850 to autumn 1851 he undertook entomological excursions and on the very first of these the capture of a series of freshly emerged Synanthedon tipuliformis in the cemetery of Stralau established his predilection for the clearwing moths (Sesiidae). He became friends with fellow students Theodor Johannes Krüper (later director of the natural history museum in Athens) and Carl Eduard Adolph Gerstaecker (later professor in Greifswald) and met many of the Berlin entomologists of the era, especially Grabow, Simon, Scherffling, Libbach, Glasbrenner, Mützel, Streckfuß, Walther, the Kricheldorff brothers, Ribbe and Kalisch. Their collecting grounds were mainly the Grunewald, the Jungfernheide (where at that time Staurophora celsia still occurred), the Wuhlheide, the Kalkberge near Straußberg and the lonely Finkenkrug, then situated deep inside the forest.

In autumn 1851 Staudinger seems to have fallen ill (though the biographical sources are silent about the nature of his ailment) and after a prolonged illness he was advised to go on a recovery trip. Accordingly, Staudinger spent May to August 1852 at Lake Geneva and in the Mont Blanc area, then he travelled across the Simplon Pass to Genoa and thence – always on foot – along the Riviera to Nice, Marseille, and Montpellier where he stayed until late November, everywhere socialising with local entomologists. After a visit at home he travelled to Paris in January 1853 to perfect his French and to learn Italian and English. At Easter 1853 he took up his studies in Berlin again and collected intensively – mainly Sesiidae – together with Kalisch, Ribbe and the Kricheldorff brothers. In March 1854 he received his Dr. phil. degree for the thesis "De Sesiis agro Berolinensis".

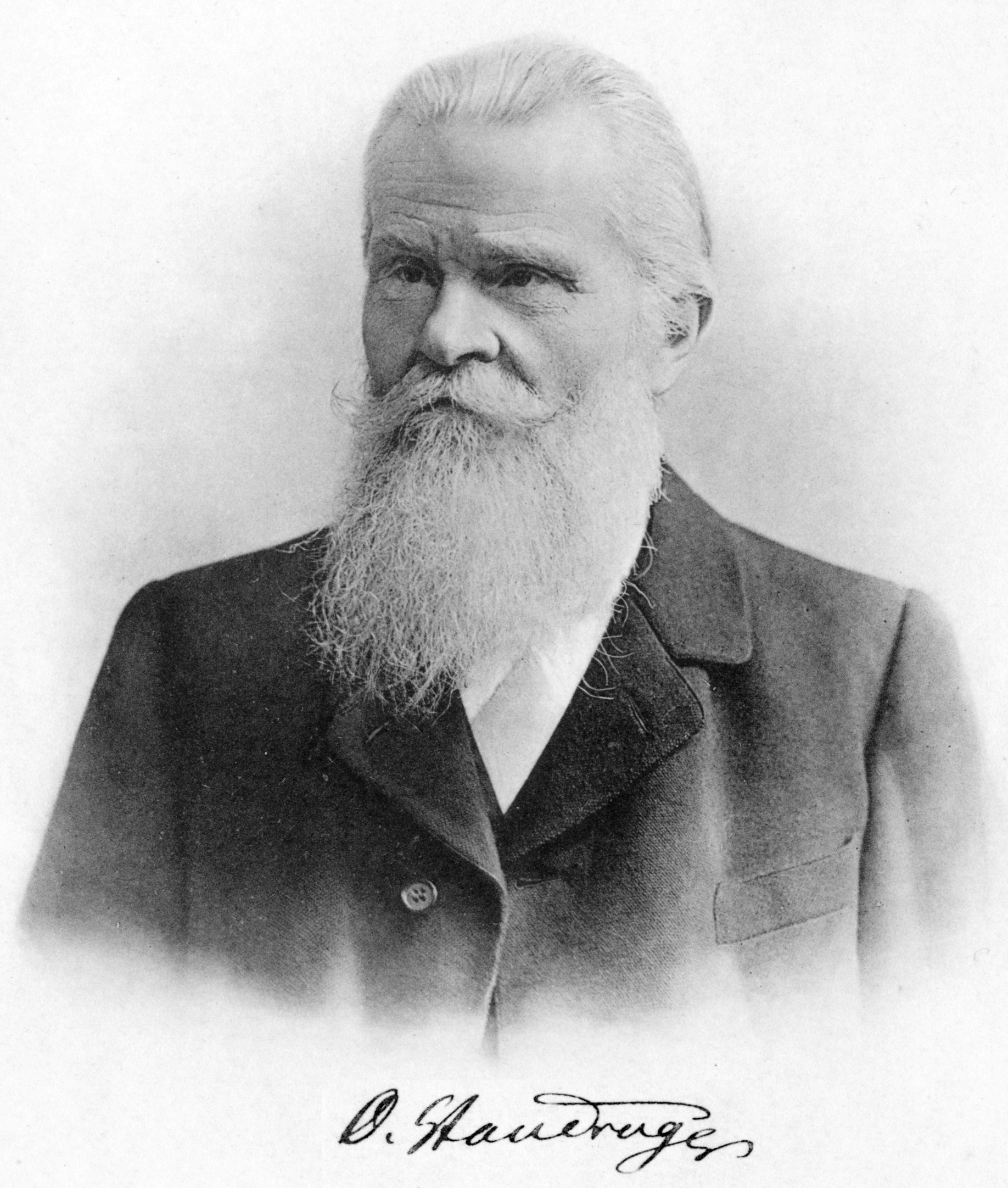
Otto Staudinger

From April to October 1854 Staudinger collected in Sardinia with the intention to discover the larvae of Papilio hospiton in which he succeeded after many failures. In 1855 he collected in the Alps (Carinthia, Glockner area). In April 1856 he started on a voyage to Iceland together with C. Kalisch. On his return in the autumn of 1856 he became engaged to entomologist Grabow's daughter and married her on 21 January 1857. The same night the couple departed and travelled via Paris, Lyon, Marseille – where they stopped and learned Spanish within ten days – Barcelona, Valencia and Almería to Málaga, where they stayed for a month. Then they spent nine months in Granada (living in the Alhambra) where Staudinger collected extensively and where their daughter was born on 2 November. In December they went via Málaga to Chiclana near Cádiz, spent the first half of 1858 there and finally returned to Berlin in July. Because of the costs of his travels Staudinger founded a business and, with the help of his father-in-law, began to sell parts of his collections. Over the years this grew into a substantial and successful naturalist business with worldwide connections. In 1859 the Staudinger family moved to Dresden where his son Paul was born the same year. In Dresden Staudinger built the Diana-Bad (Diana Baths) in 1864, a large facility with bath tubs, steam baths, and Irish-Roman baths which Staudinger loved since this type of bath had helped him when he had a bad cold on a journey. When his city dwelling became too small in 1874 he moved to the "Villa Diana" in Blasewitz near Dresden. In 1879 the Danish-born entomologist Andreas Bang-Haas (1846–1925) entered into the business, married Staudinger's daughter in 1880 and became co-owner of the firm, now "Staudinger & Bang-Haas", in 1884 or 1887. In 1884 the growing company moved to the larger "Villa Sphinx" and ten years later a two-story wing had to be added. From the mid-1880s onward Staudinger entrusted the company business more and more to Bang-Haas and concentrated on his work in Lepidoptera taxonomy. Staudinger died on 13 October 1900 during a recovery trip in Lucerne, Switzerland.

=== Further important collecting trips ===
- 1860 Norway, Finnmarken (with M. F. Wocke).
- 1862 Castilia, La Granja, San Ildefonso.
- 1866 Southern France, Ardèche.
- 1872 Cilikian Taurus (with E. Funke).
- 1875 Turkey, Amasia (with E. Funke and F. Zach).
- 1880 Southern Spain, Chiclana and Granada (with wife, mother-in-law, and the Korb family).
- 1884 Castilia, San Ildefonso with a detour to Lisbon (with A. Bang-Haas and son Paul).
- 1887 Algeria, Biskra and Lambèse, Djebel Aures.
- Several shorter trips to the Alps.

== Achievements and impact ==
One of Staudinger's most valuable and durable achievements was the publication of three catalogues of the Lepidoptera of Europe and eventually of the entire palaearctic region. These "Check-lists" as they would be called today were immediately accepted by lepidopterists, used as a basis of faunal lists and stimulated further taxonomic studies. As early as 1861 Staudinger together with Max Ferdinand Wocke published a Catalog der Lepidopteren Europa's und der angrenzenden Länder [Catalogue of the Lepidoptera of Europe and adjacent countries], himself treating the so-called Macrolepidoptera, and Wocke the Microlepidoptera. The next edition, bilingual in German and French, appeared in 1871 (Catalog der Lepidopteren des Europaeischen Faunengebiets [Catalogue of the Lepidoptera of the European Faunal Region]) and found wide distribution. The 1901 edition became a standard work of reference; it was edited after Staudinger's death by Hans Rebel who wrote the Microlepidoptera part while Staudinger had treated the Macrolepidoptera: Catalog der Lepidopteren des palaearctischen Faunengebietes [Catalogue of the Lepidoptera of the Palaearctic Faunal Region].

Staudinger also played a key role as an initiator of entomological and biological exploration in many parts of the globe. He not only bought collections from the eastern Palaearctic and many tropical areas but he often sent collectors and naturalists to specific areas of interest:

- Amur and Ussuri regions (Vladivostok, Suifun, Sutschan, Isle of Askold: F. Dörries and brothers, 1877–1898, Jablonovoi-Mountains ["Apfelgebirge"], 1896),
- NE Siberia (Vitim: O. Herz, 1888),
- Tarbagatai (near Zaysan: J. Haberhauer, 1877),
- Altai (near Ongadai, Bashkam, Tshuja valley: Henry John Elwes and Borezowsky, 1898),
- Mongolia (Uliastai: a cossack collecting for H. Leder, 1893; Kentei mountains: F. Dörries, 1889, 1893; around Urga: J. Haberhauer, 1895; Changai: H. Leder, 1899),
- Tibet (between Lop Nur and Qinghai Lake, E. Rückbeil for R. Tancré, 1893–1893),
- Chinese Turkestan (near Korla: J. Haberhauer, 1897),
- eastern Tien Shan (Chamyl and elsewhere: J. Haberhauer, 1896),
- Tien Shan (between Issyk-Kul and Kuldja: E. Rückbeil, 1895?),
- Asia minor (Mardin, Gaziantep, Merzifon, Malatya, Hadjin, Kayseri, Tokat, Antakya, Marasch and elsewhere: J. Manisadjian, 1875–1897),
- Taurus (near Zeitun: Haradjian, 1897),
- Syria (F. Zach),
- Palestine (Bacher, 1896–1899; J. Paulus, 1890–1898),
- Sierra Leone and Cameroon (Dr. Preuss, 1866),
- Indo-Australian archipelago (Waigeu, Moluccas [Ambon, Batjan, Ceram, Halmahera], Celebes [Minahassa], Sangir, Philippines [Jolo, East Mindanao, Mindoro], Timor, Palawan, Sarawak: Dr. K. K. Platen, 1880–1895),
- Ceylon, Penang, Borneo (Brunei, Labuan, Kinabalu) (J. Waterstradt, 1888–1904),
- Panama and Chiriqui (H. Ribbe, 1878),
- Amazon (Dr. Hahnel, 1879–1884, 1885–1887, later also O. Michael and the Garlepp brothers, these also in Peru und Bolivia),
- Peru (Chanchamayo: F. Thamm, around 1870–1873).

In this way Staudinger succeeded in publishing whole faunal lists of districts some of which had been entomological terra incognita before. Examples are the Lepidopteren-Fauna Kleinasiens (1881), Die Macrolepidopteren des Amurgebietes (1892) and the Lepidopteren des Kentei-Gebirges (1892).

The taxonomic work on these collections was Staudinger's life work. He described hundreds if not thousands of taxa, mainly from the families of the so-called Macrolepidoptera. All scientifically important specimens, especially the types – which Staudinger labelled "Origin." (for "original specimen") – remained in his private collection. A bibliography of Staudinger's entomological works lists 137 publications (Anonymus 1901). Numerous taxa have been named for Staudinger.

After Staudinger's death the firm "Staudinger & Bang-Haas" was led by Andreas Bang-Haas. In 1913 his son Otto Bang-Haas (1882–1948) became the sole owner and continued to run the firm until his death. After that it was dissolved on 30 September 1948.

== Collection ==
Staudinger's private collection (with the types of the taxa described by him) went to the Zoologisches Museum der Humboldt-Universität in Berlin in 1907, his collection of palaearctic Microlepidoptera and larvae of palaearctic Macrolepidoptera went to the same institution in 1937.

The business collection of palaearctic Lepidoptera went to Hans Kotzsch after Otto Bang-Haas' death and finally came to the Staatliches Museum für Tierkunde Dresden in 1961.

== Selected works ==
- Staudinger, O. 1859. Diagnosen nebst kurze Beschreibungen neuer Andalusischer Lepidopteren. - Stettiner Entomologische Zeitung 20:211–259.
- Staudinger, O. & Wocke, M. F. (1861): Catalog der Lepidopteren Europa's und der angrenzenden Länder. – Dresden (Staudinger & Burdach). XVI + 192 pp.
- Staudinger, O. & Wocke, M. F. (1871): Catalog der Lepidopteren des Europaeischen Faunengebiets. – Dresden (Burdach). XXXVII + 426 pp.
- Staudinger, O. (1871): Beitrag zur Lepidopteren-Fauna Griechenlands. – Horae societatis entomologicae rossicae, 7: 3-304, 3 pls.
- Staudinger, O. (1881): Lepidopteren-Fauna Kleinasiens. – Horae societatis entomologicae rossicae, 16: 65-135.
- Staudinger, O. & Schatz, E. (Eds.) (1884–1892): Exotische Schmetterlinge. Two volumes. – Fürth (Löwensohn). 333 pp., 100 pls., II + 284 pp., 50 pls.
- Staudinger, O. (1886–1889): Centralasiatische Lepidopteren. – Entomologische Zeitung Stettin, 47 (1886): 193-215, 225-256; 48 (1887): 1-65, 49-102; 49 (1888): 1-65, 50 (1889): 16-60.
- Staudinger, O. (1892): Die Macrolepidopteren des Amurgebietes. I. Theil. – Mémoires sur les Lépidoptères, 6: 83-658, pls. 4-14.
- Staudinger, O. (1892): Lepidopteren des Kentei-Gebirges. – Deutsche Entomologische Zeitschrift "Iris", 5: 300-393, pl. 3.
- Staudinger, O. (1894): Hochandine Lepidopteren. – Deutsche Entomologische Zeitschrift "Iris", 7: 43-100, 2 pls.
- Staudinger, O. (1898): Lepidopteren des Apfelgebirges. – Deutsche Entomologische Zeitschrift "Iris", 10: 320-344.
- Staudinger, O. & Rebel, H. (1901): Catalog der Lepidopteren des palaearctischen Faunengebietes. I. Theil: Famil. Papilionidae – Hepialidae. – Berlin (Friedländer & Sohn). XXXII + 411 pp., 1 pl.
- Catalog der Lepidopteren des europæischen Faunengebiets.I. Macrolepidoptera bearb. von Dr. O. Staudinger. II. Microlepidoptera bearb. von Dr. M. Wocke.Published 1871 by Dr. O. Staudinger [etc.] in Dresden .Written in German. online

Wikispecies (see below) provides another list and links to digitised papers by Staudinger

== Scale of the dealership ==
This advertisement placed in the 1924 issue of Entomological News (Philadelphia, U.S.A.) gives an indication of the scale of the dealership still known as O. Staudinger & A. Bang-Haas, Dresden at that time under Otto Bang-Haas. "THE LARGEST STOCK OF INSECTS OF THE WORLD! ESTABLISHED 1858 INDISPENSABLE TO EVERY COLLECTOR, TO EVERY MUSEUM! Lepidoptera List No. 58 contains 28,000 species, the greatest and most extensive of all lists. Price $1.00. Coleoptera List No. 30 contains 30,000 species of Coleoptera, Price 50 cents. Other Insects list No. VII contains 10.000 species. Price 50 cents. This amount will be reimbursed by orders on insects. List No. XI contains series of Lepidoptera, collections, books, apparatus, insect pins, supplies. Free. Dr. O. Staudinger & A. Bang-Haas, Blasewitz, Dresden, Germany WILL BUY OR EXCHANGE Clerids, Phanaeus, Monilema and all Cetonids from all parts of the world."
