= Siedlec, Strzelce County =

Siedlec Schedlitz
- Village
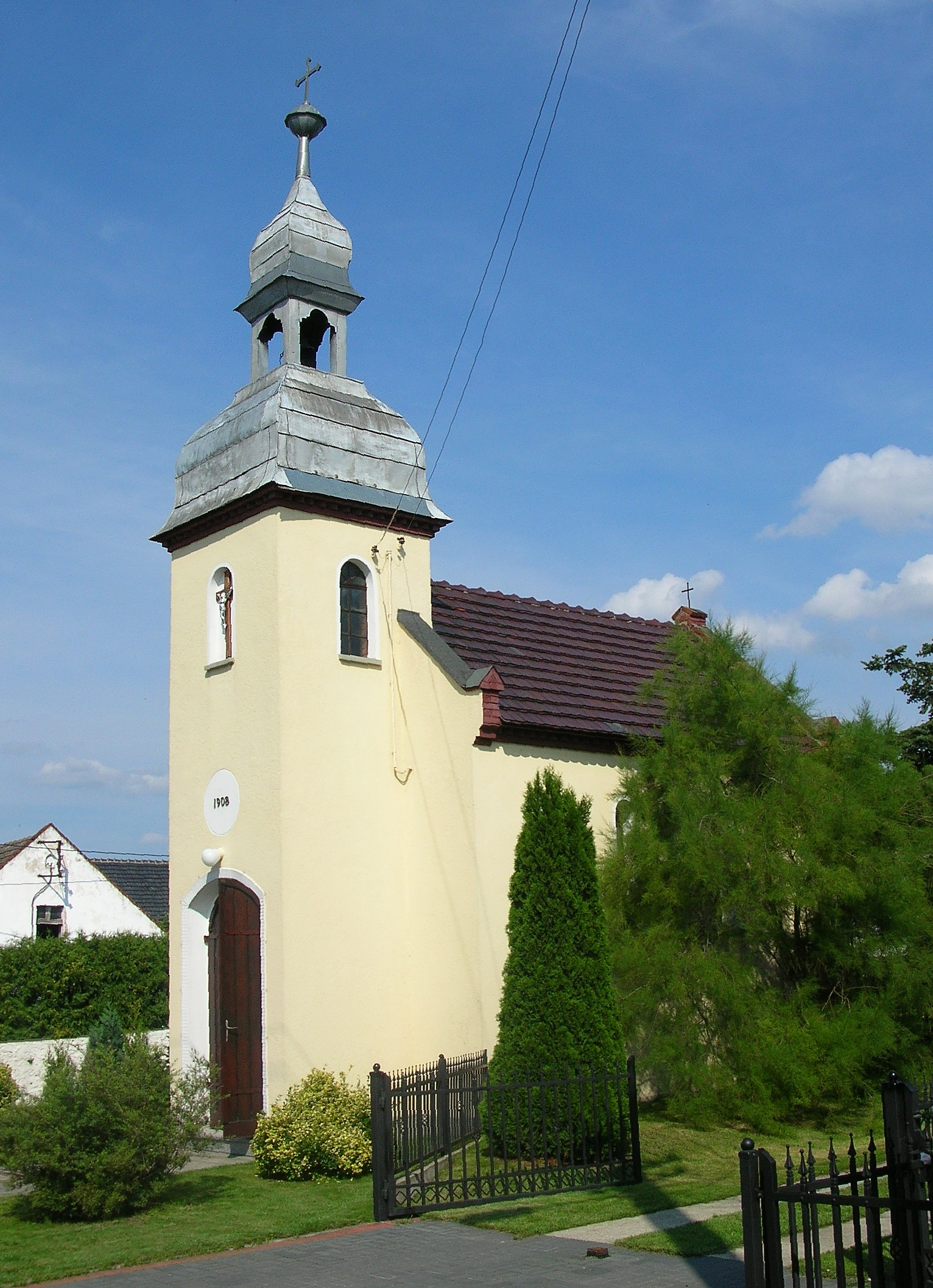
- Chapel in Siedlec

- Location within Poland
- Coordinates: 50°31′2″N 18°7′24″E
- Country: Poland
- Voivodeship: Opole
- County: Strzelce
- Gmina: Izbicko

Population
  - Total: 480
- Time zone: UTC+1 (CET)
  - Summer (DST): UTC+2 (CEST)
- Vehicle registration: OST

Siedlec ([ˈɕɛdlɛt͡s], additional name in German: Schedlitz) is a village in the administrative district of Gmina Izbicko, within Strzelce County, Opole Voivodeship, in southern Poland.
