= Wredenhagen =

- Ortsteil of Eldetal
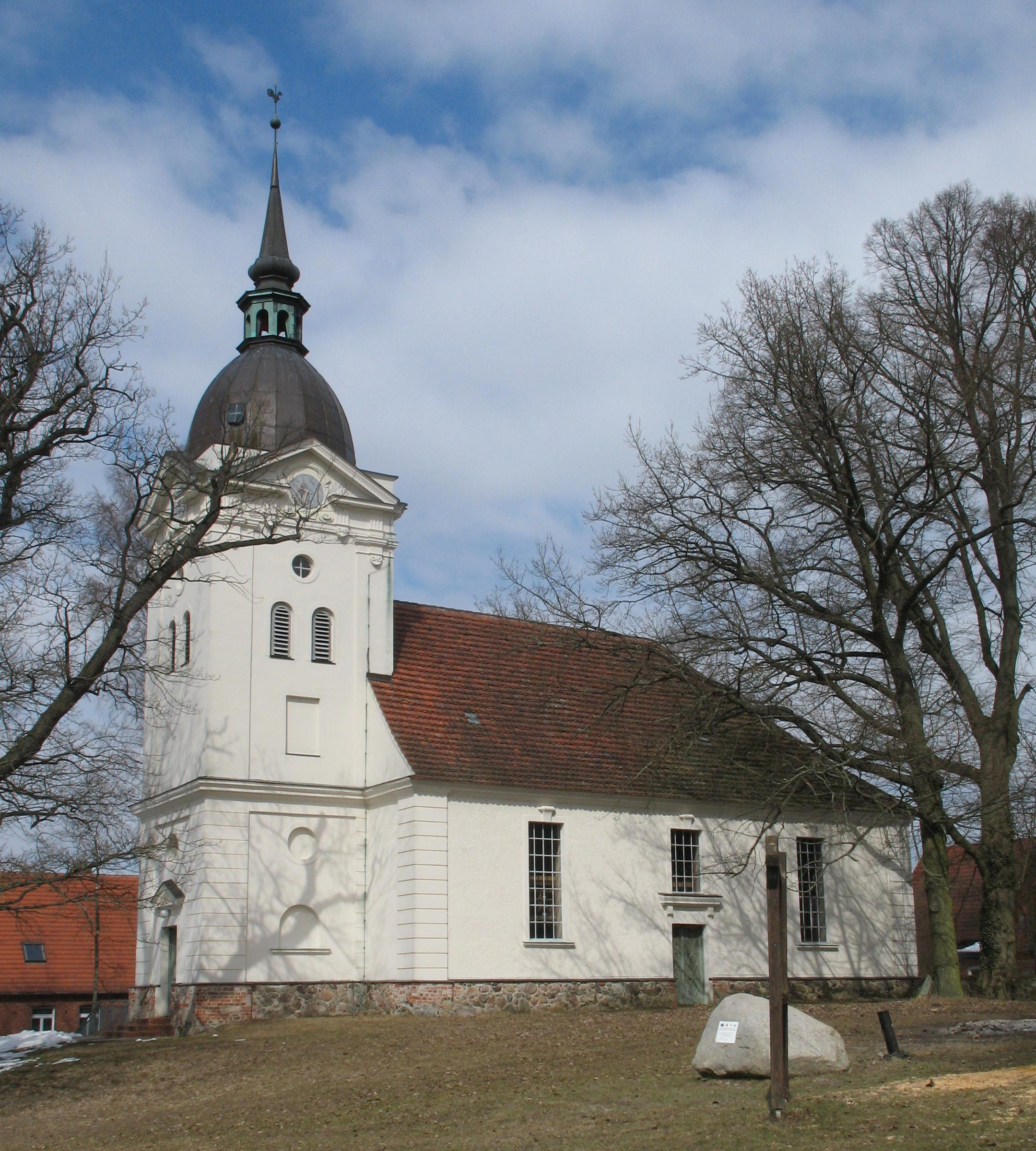
- Interactive map of Wredenhagen
- Location within Germany Location within Mecklenburg-Vorpommern
- Coordinates: 53°17′05″N 12°31′0″E
- Country: Germany
- State: Mecklenburg-Vorpommern
- District: Mecklenburgische Seenplatte
- Municipality: Eldetal

Area
  - Total: 28.27 km^{2} (10.92 sq mi)
- Elevation: 68 m (223 ft)

Population (2017-12-31)
  - Total: 448
  - Density: 15.8/km^{2} (41.0/sq mi)
- Time zone: UTC+01:00 (CET)
  - Summer (DST): UTC+02:00 (CEST)
- Postal codes: 17209
- Dialling codes: 039925
- Vehicle registration: MÜR
- Website: www.amt-roebel- mueritz.de

Wredenhagen is a village and a former municipality in the Mecklenburgische Seenplatte district, in Mecklenburg-Vorpommern, Germany. Since May 2019, it is part of the new municipality Eldetal.

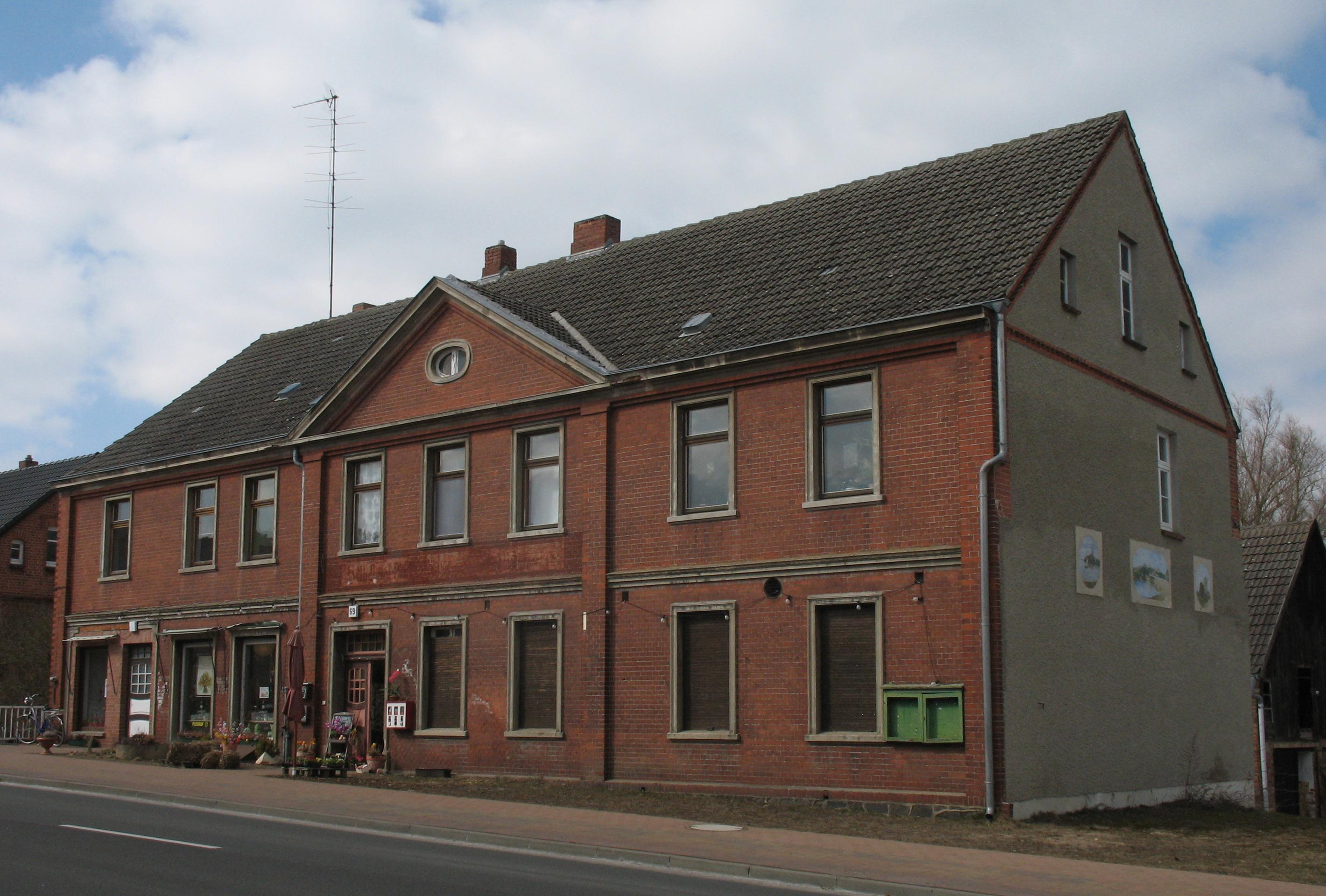
Dorfstr. 69

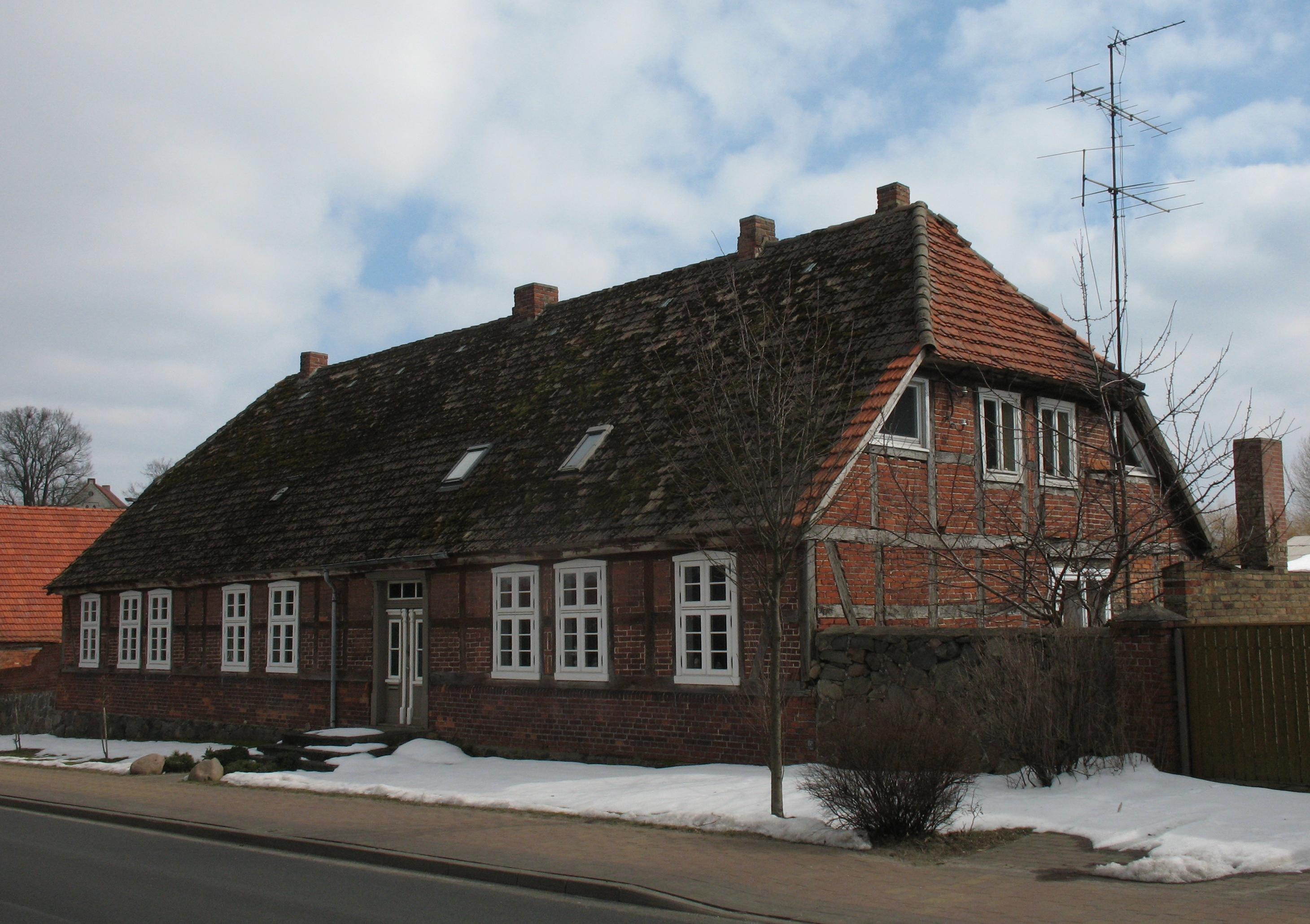
Dorfstr. 70

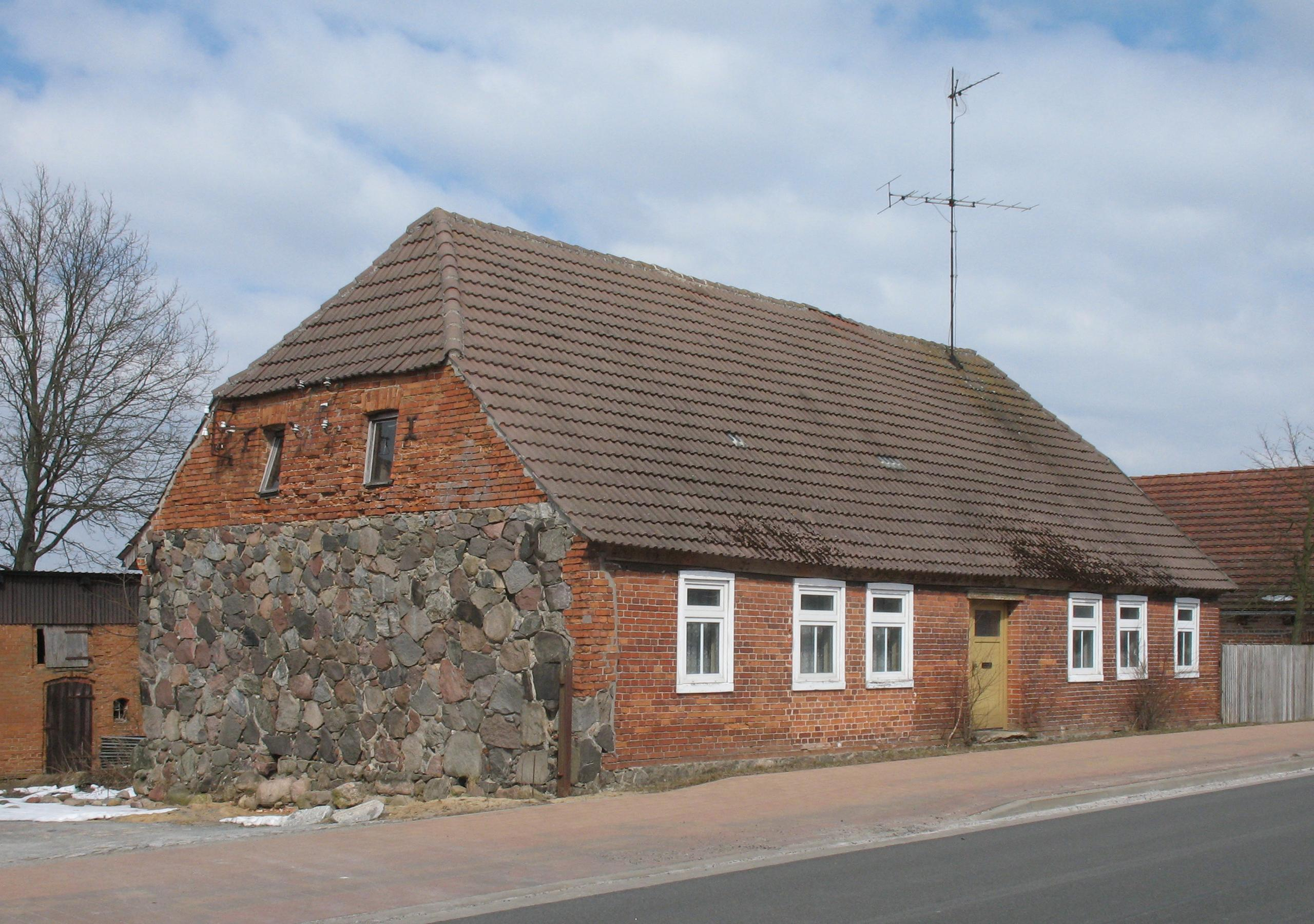
Dorfstr. 75

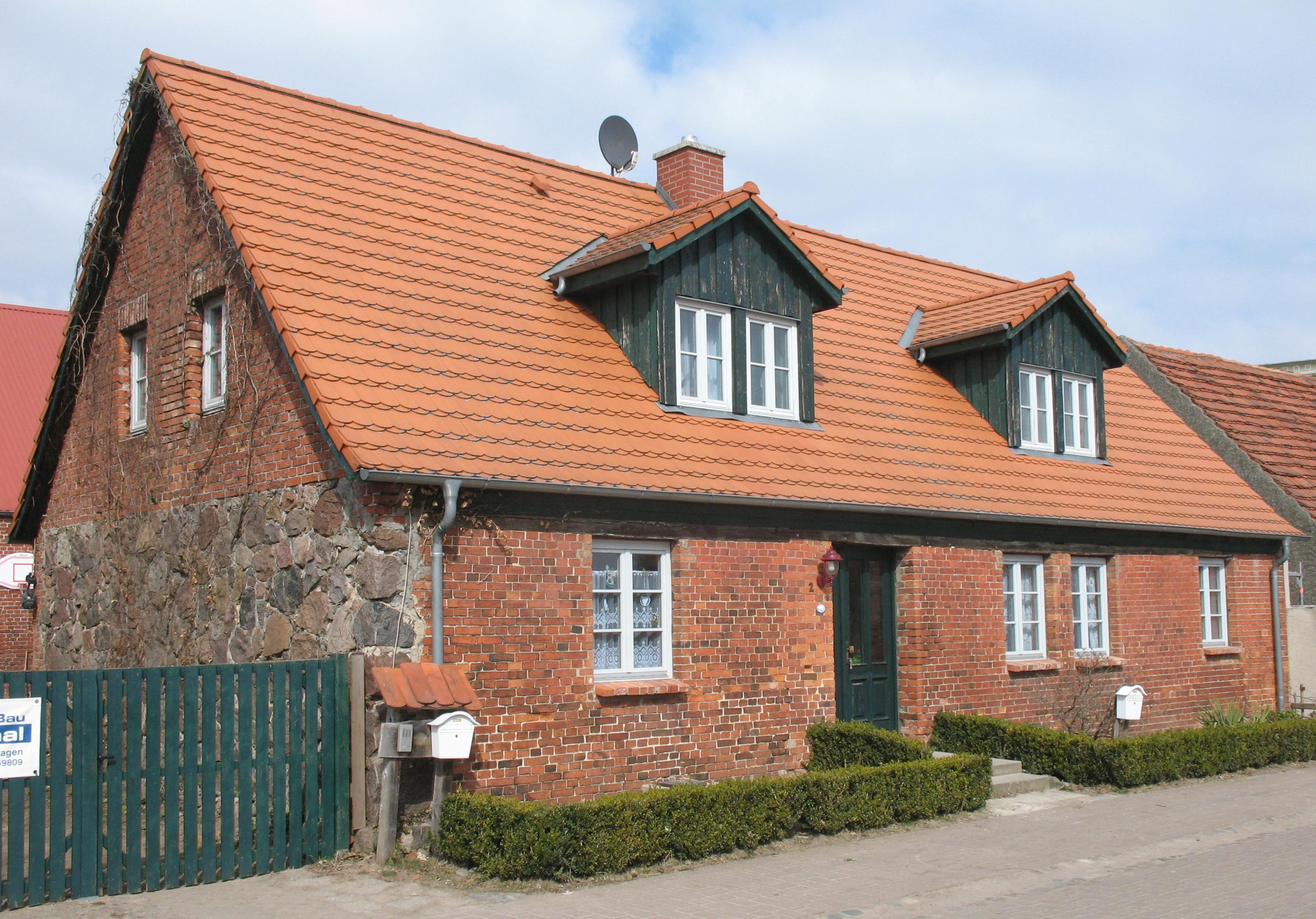
Diekstrat 2

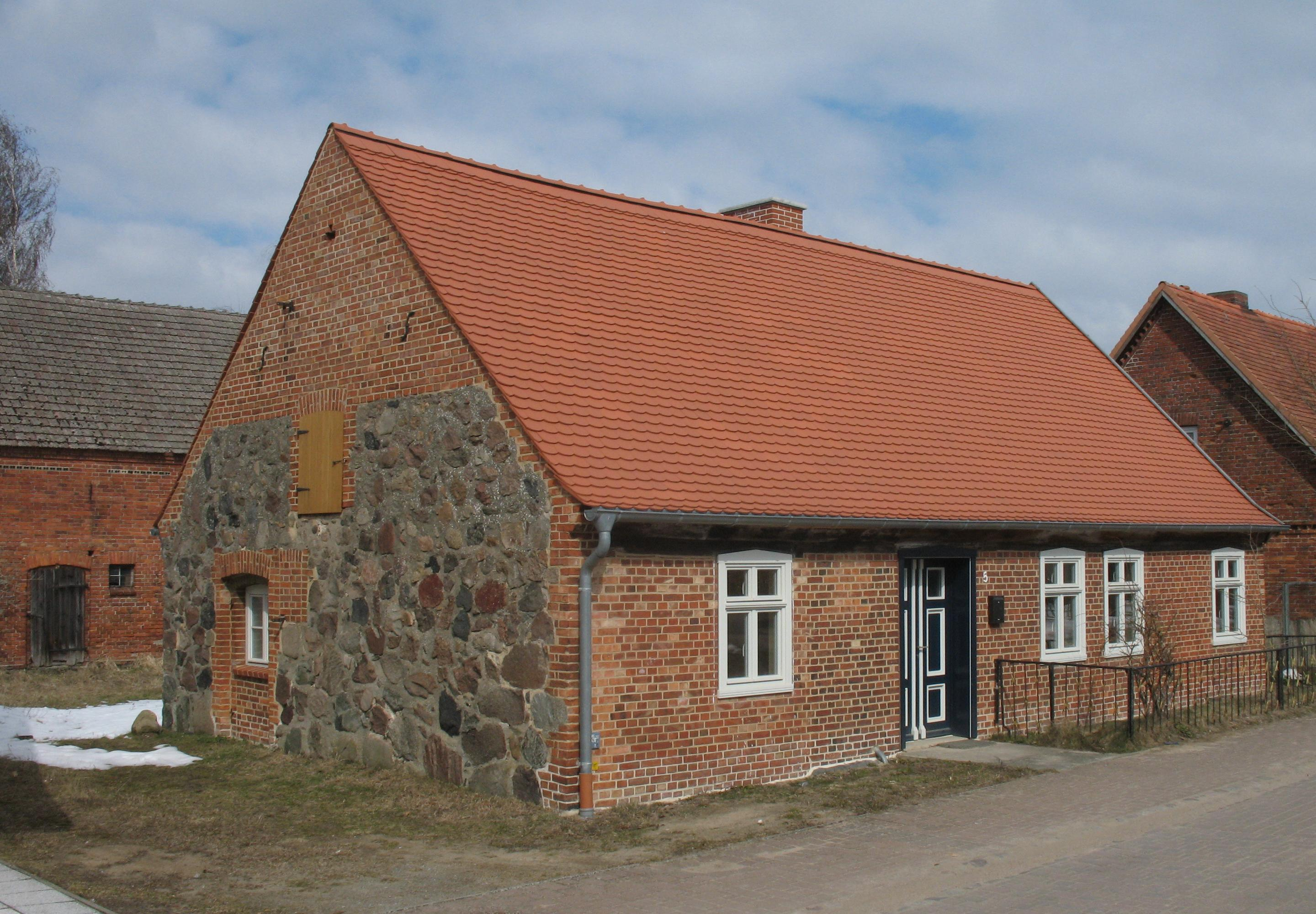
Diekstrat 5
