= Suchodaniec =

Suchodaniec Sucho-Danietz
- Village
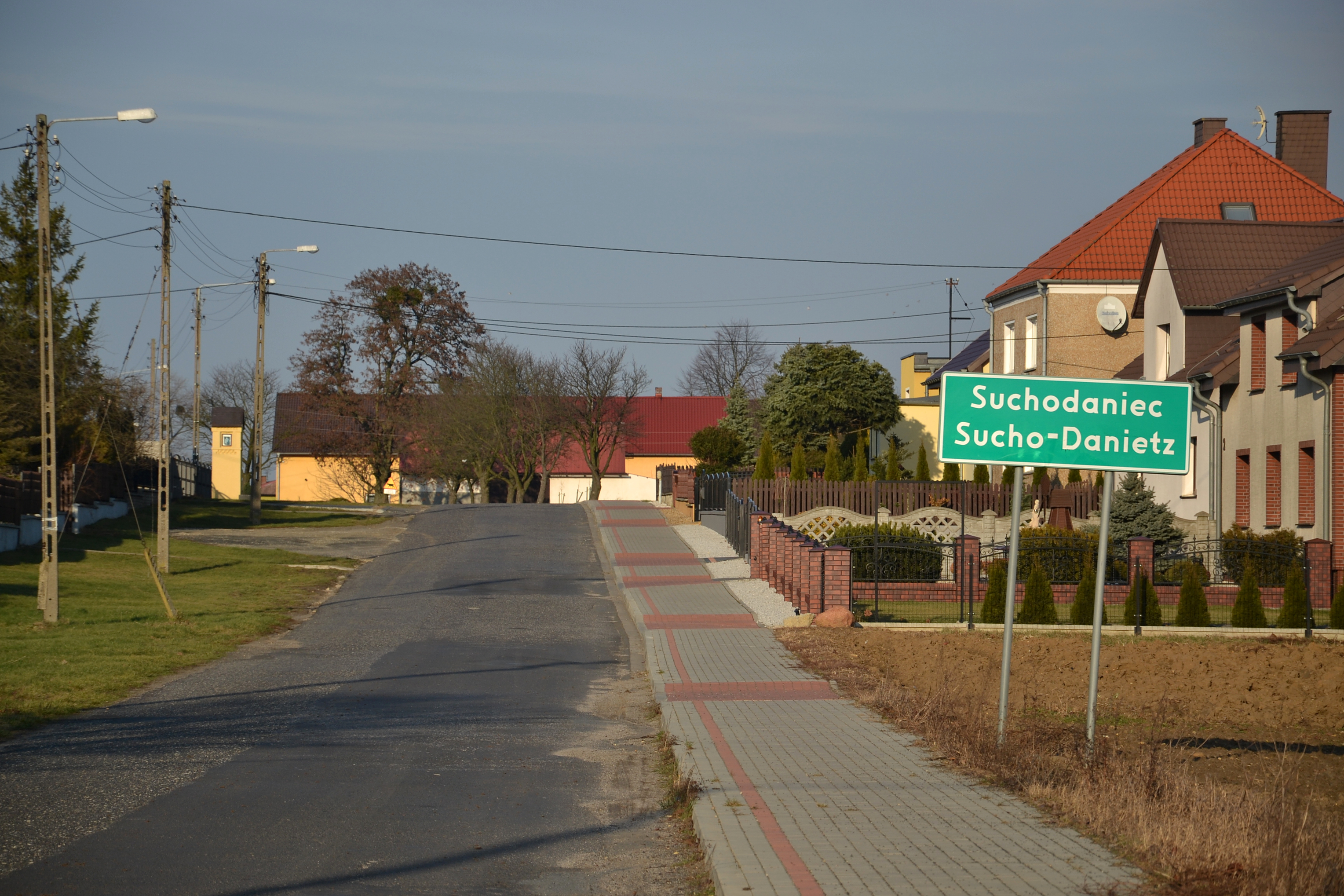
- Polish-German entrance sign

- Location within Poland
- Coordinates: 50°33′52″N 18°12′08″E
- Country: Poland
- Voivodeship: Opole
- County: Strzelce
- Gmina: Izbicko
- Time zone: UTC+1 (CET)
  - Summer (DST): UTC+2 (CEST)
- Vehicle registration: OST

Suchodaniec ([suxɔˈdaɲɛt͡s], additional name in German: Sucho-Danietz) is a village in the administrative district of Gmina Izbicko, within Strzelce County, Opole Voivodeship, in southern Poland.
