= Sprzęcice =

Sprzęcice Sprentschütz
- Village
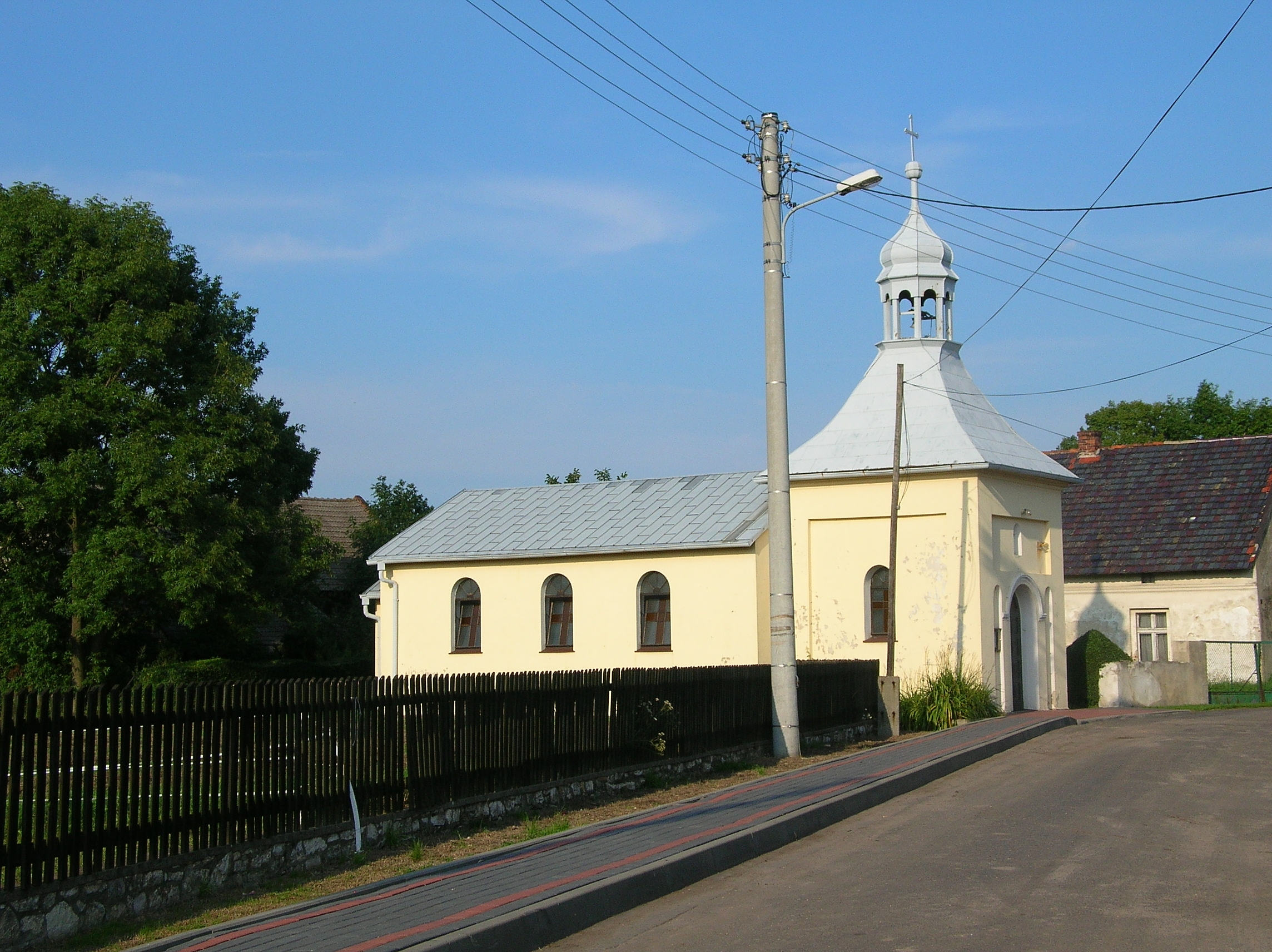
- Chapel in Sprzęcice

- Location within Poland
- Coordinates: 50°29′59″N 18°07′02″E
- Country: Poland
- Voivodeship: Opole
- County: Strzelce
- Gmina: Izbicko
- Time zone: UTC+1 (CET)
  - Summer (DST): UTC+2 (CEST)
- Vehicle registration: OST

Sprzęcice ([spʂɛnˈt͡ɕit͡sɛ], additional name in German: Sprentschütz) is a village in the administrative district of Gmina Izbicko, within Strzelce County, Opole Voivodeship, in southern Poland.
