= Izbicko =

Izbicko Stubendorf
- Village
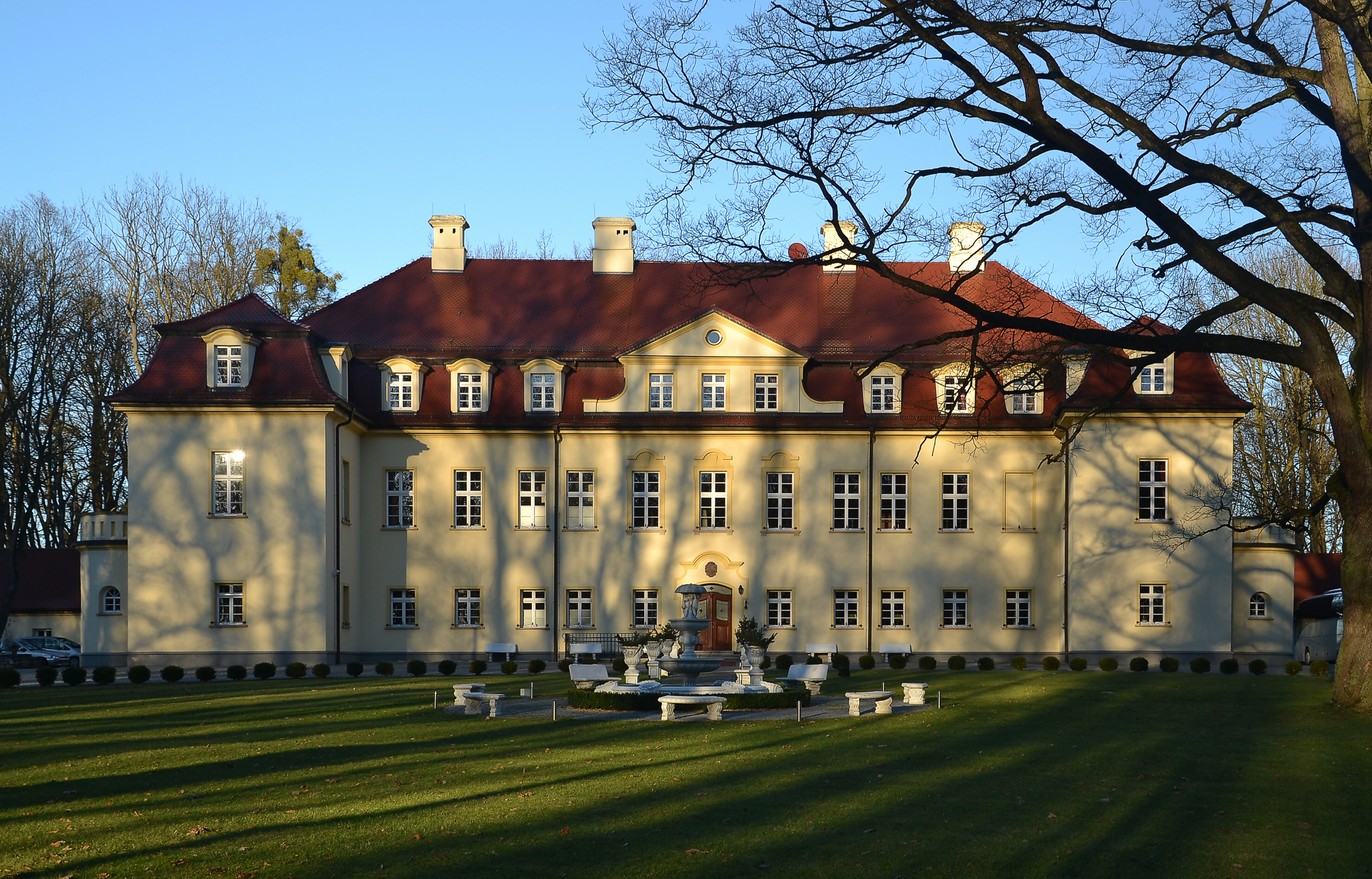
- Izbicko Palace

- Location within Poland
- Coordinates: 50°35′N 18°9′E
- Country: Poland
- Voivodeship: Opole
- County: Strzelce
- Gmina: Izbicko
- Population: 1,100
- Time zone: UTC+1 (CET)
  - Summer (DST): UTC+2 (CEST)
- Vehicle registration: OST

Izbicko ([izˈbit͡skɔ], additional name in German: Stubendorf) is a village in Strzelce County, Opole Voivodeship, in southern Poland. It is the seat of the gmina (administrative district) called Gmina Izbicko, which has been bilingual in Polish and German since 2006.
