= Ligota Czamborowa =

Ligota Czamborowa Tschammer Ellguth
- Village
- Location within Poland
- Coordinates: 50°34′24″N 18°10′46″E
- Country: Poland
- Voivodeship: Opole
- County: Strzelce
- Gmina: Izbicko
- Time zone: UTC+1 (CET)
  - Summer (DST): UTC+2 (CEST)
- Vehicle registration: OST

Ligota Czamborowa ([liˈɡɔta t͡ʂambɔˈrɔva], additional name in German: Tschammer Ellguth) is a village in the administrative district of Gmina Izbicko, within Strzelce County, Opole Voivodeship, in southern Poland.
