= Grabow-Below =

- Ortsteil of Eldetal
- Interactive map of Grabow-Below
- Location within Germany Location within Mecklenburg-Vorpommern
- Coordinates: 53°16′12″N 12°27′11″E
- Country: Germany
- State: Mecklenburg-Vorpommern
- District: Mecklenburgische Seenplatte
- Municipality: Eldetal

Area
  - Total: 13.55 km^{2} (5.23 sq mi)
- Elevation: 77 m (253 ft)

Population (2017-12-31)
  - Total: 103
  - Density: 7.60/km^{2} (19.7/sq mi)
- Time zone: UTC+01:00 (CET)
  - Summer (DST): UTC+02:00 (CEST)
- Postal codes: 17209
- Dialling codes: 039925
- Vehicle registration: MÜR
- Website: www.amt-roebel- mueritz.de

Grabow-Below is a former municipality in the Mecklenburgische Seenplatte district, in Mecklenburg-Vorpommern, Germany. Since May 2019, it is part of the new municipality Eldetal.

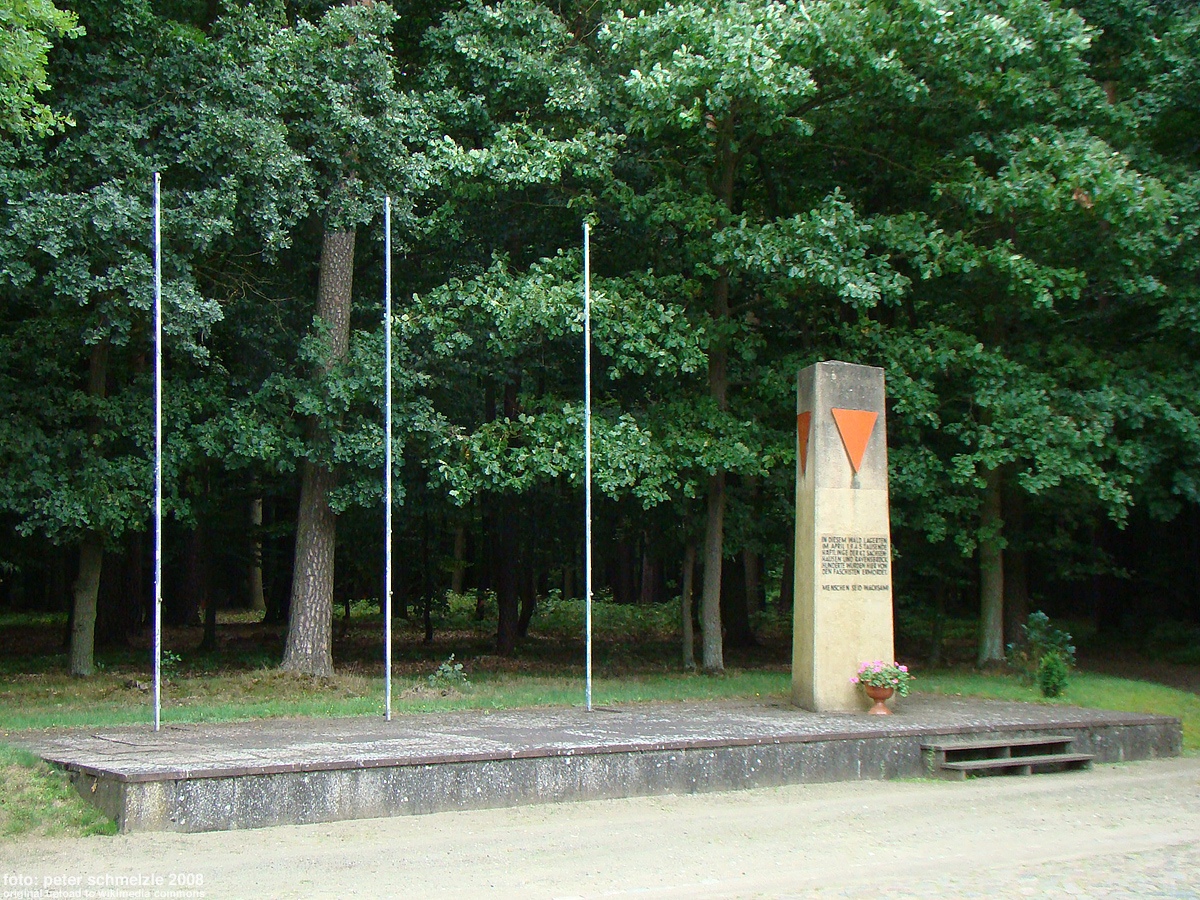
Monument in Grabow-Below for Ravensbrück death march.
