= Grabów, Opole Voivodeship =

Grabów Grabow
- Village
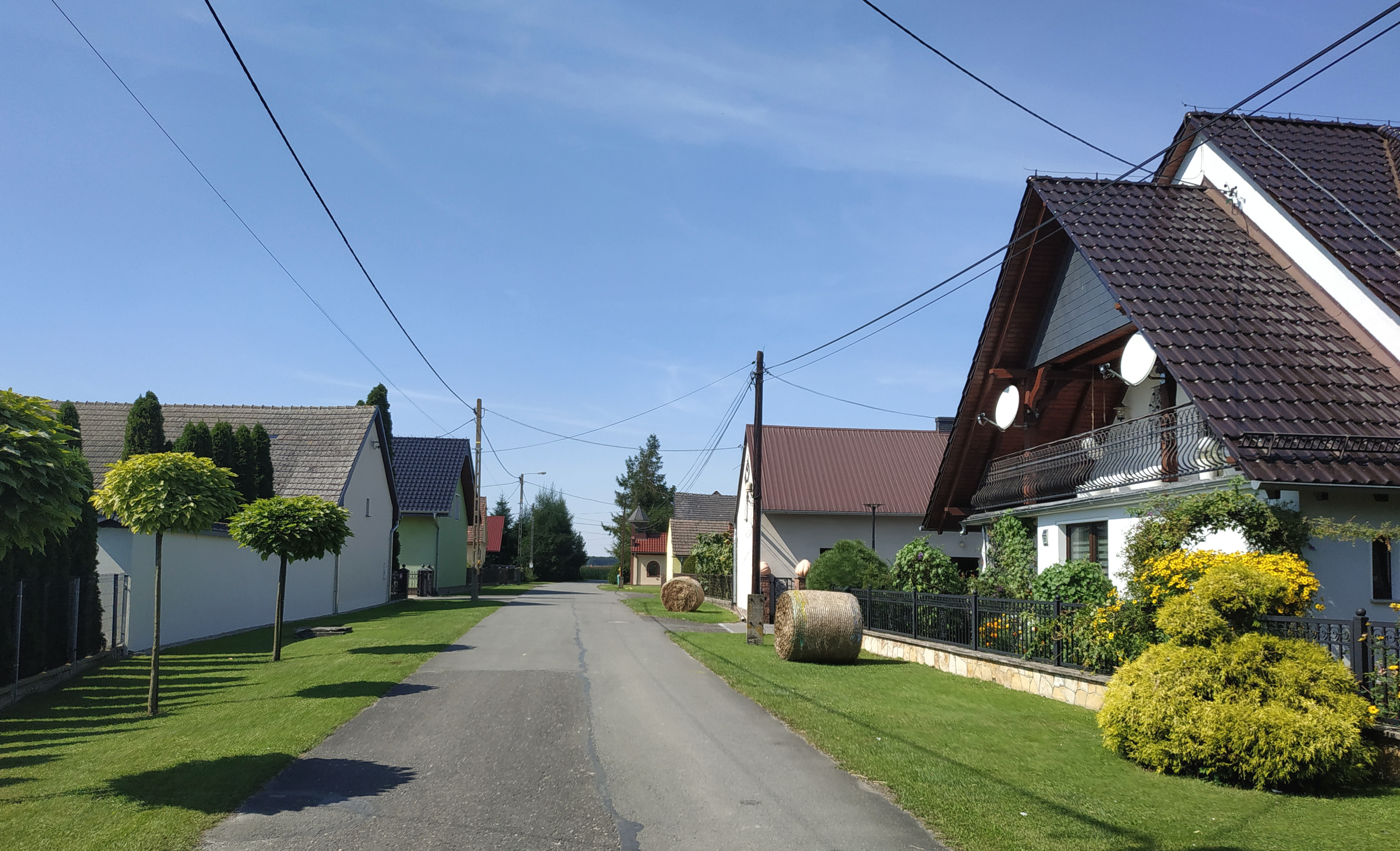

- Location within Poland
- Coordinates: 50°35′01″N 18°07′42″E
- Country: Poland
- Voivodeship: Opole
- County: Strzelce
- Gmina: Izbicko
- Time zone: UTC+1 (CET)
  - Summer (DST): UTC+2 (CEST)
- Vehicle registration: OST

Grabów ([ˈɡrabuf], additional name in German: Grabow) is a village in the administrative district of Gmina Izbicko, within Strzelce County, Opole Voivodeship, in southern Poland.
