= Carl Grabow =

German entomologist (1790–1859)

Carl Wilhelm Louis (Ludwig) Grabow (1790 – 19 January 1859) was a German entomologist especially interested in Coleoptera and Lepidoptera.

Grabow was born in Prenzlau. He was an insect dealer in Dresden and a friend and associate of the younger Otto Staudinger. He collected insects in Germany, Spain and Portugal.
