= Ernst Schatz =

German entomologist

Ernst Schatz (1844–1887) was a German entomologist who specialised in Lepidoptera.

With Otto Staudinger (1830–1900), he wrote Exotische Schmetterlinge in 1888. His collection of exotic butterflies and moths is held by the Museum für Naturkunde in Berlin. Schatz also published the first treatment of the butterfly tribe Limenitini addressing species across the globe.
