= Grabowa (river) =

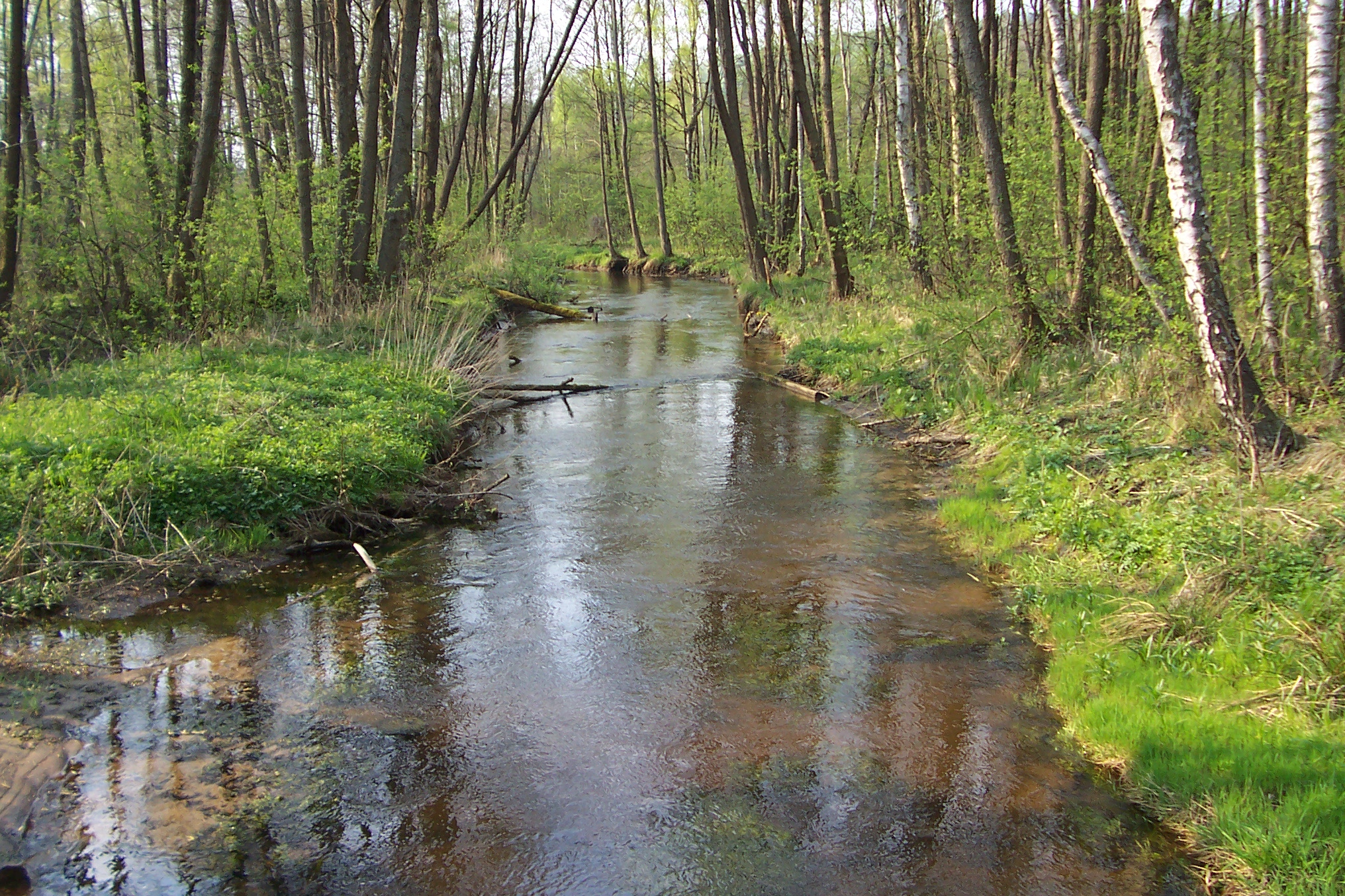

Location
- Country: Poland

Physical characteristics
- Mouth
  - location: Wieprza
  - coordinates: 54°25′59″N 16°23′18″E

Basin features
- Progression: Wieprza→ Baltic Sea

Grabowa (German: Grabow) is a river in the Pomerania region of northern Poland, 74 km (46 mi) long. Its source is Lake Wockmin near Sławno, from where it flows to Darłowo before it flows into the Wieprza river just a few kilometers before the Wieprza reaches the Baltic Sea. Near Jeźyce, Grabowa forks with one arm flowing into Bukowo Lake.
