= Silesia =

Historical region of Central Europe

Silesia Śląsk (Polish) Ślōnsk (Silesian) Slezsko (Czech) Schlesien (German) Schläsing (Lower Silesian)
- Historical region
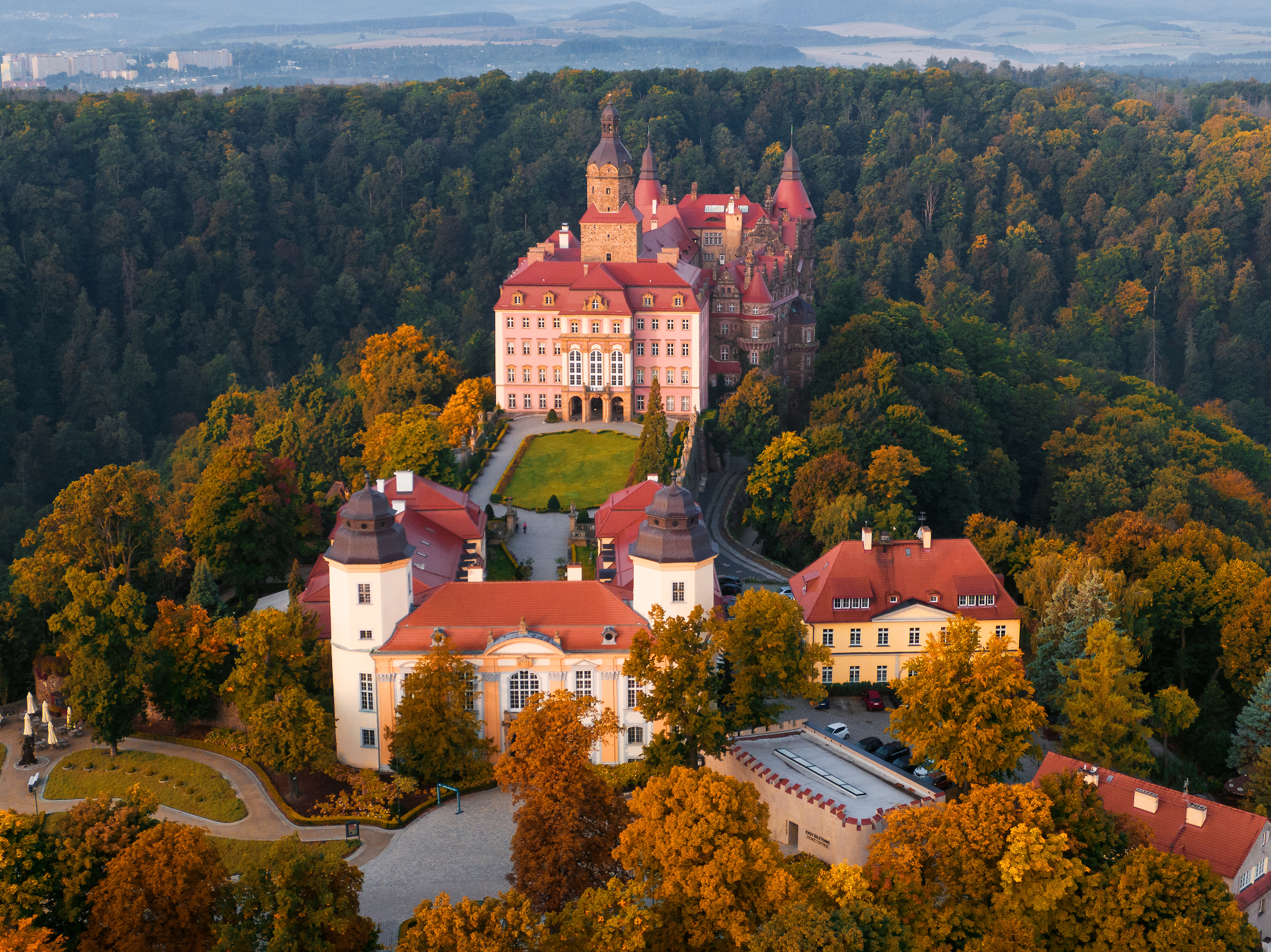
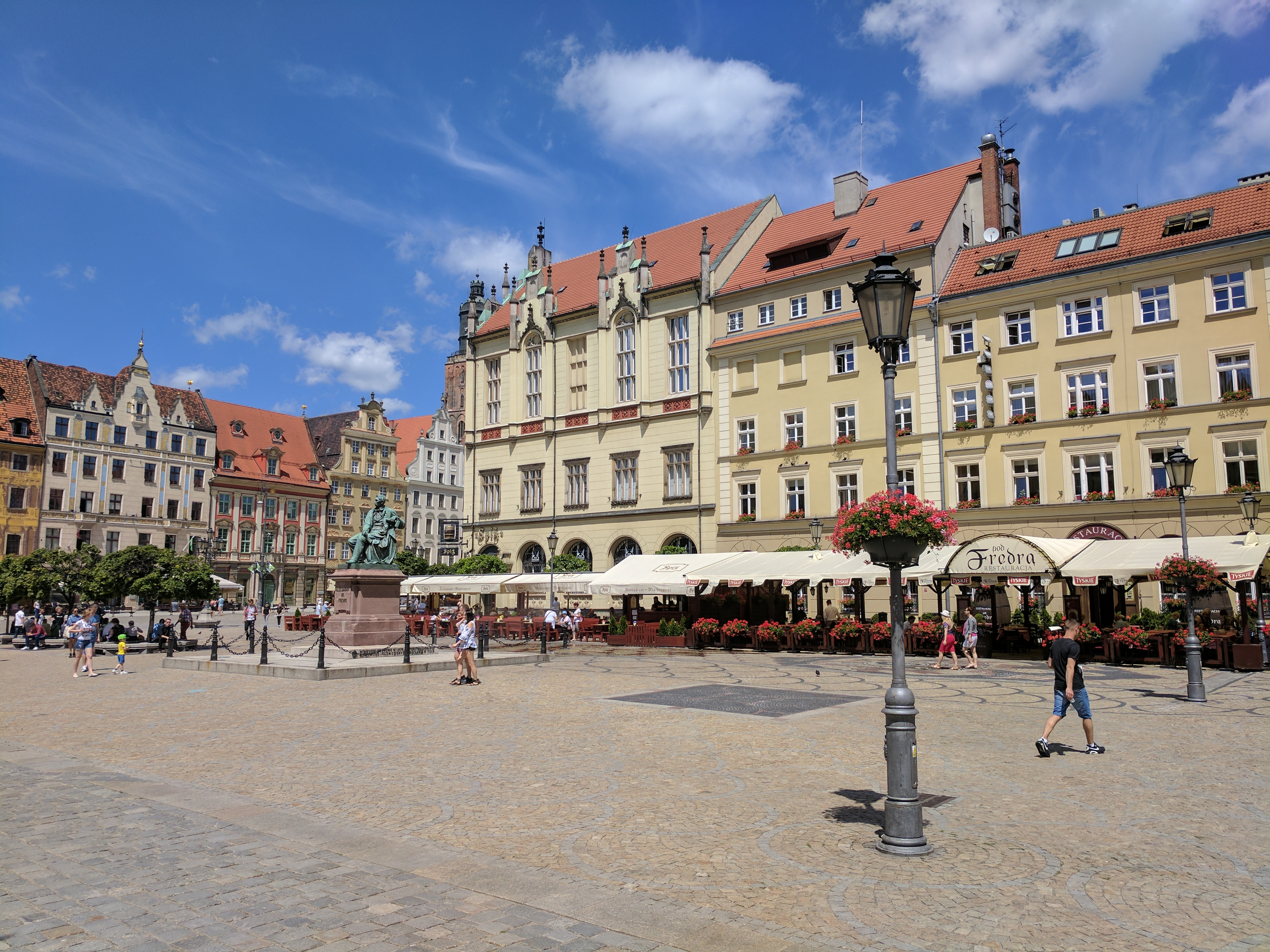
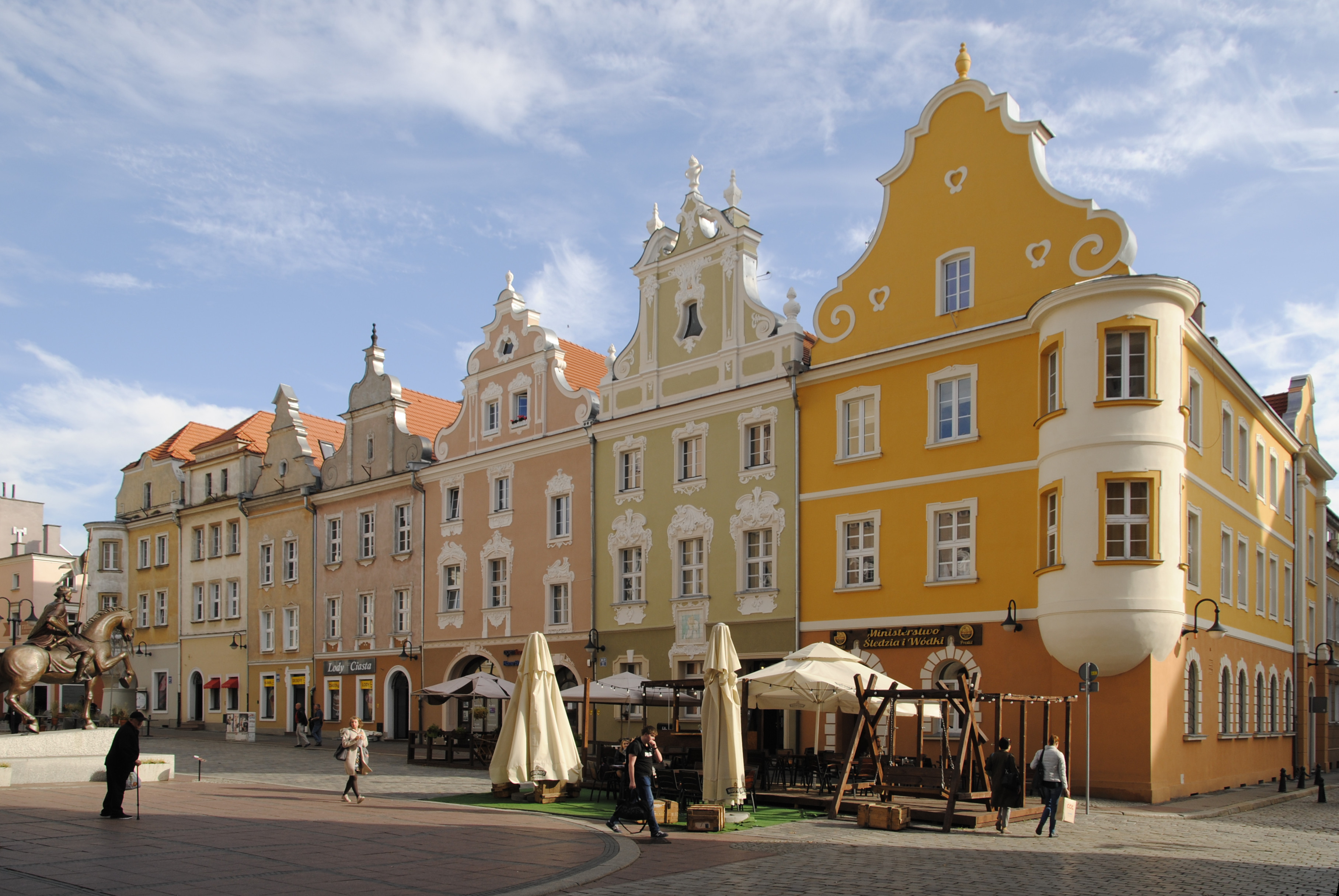
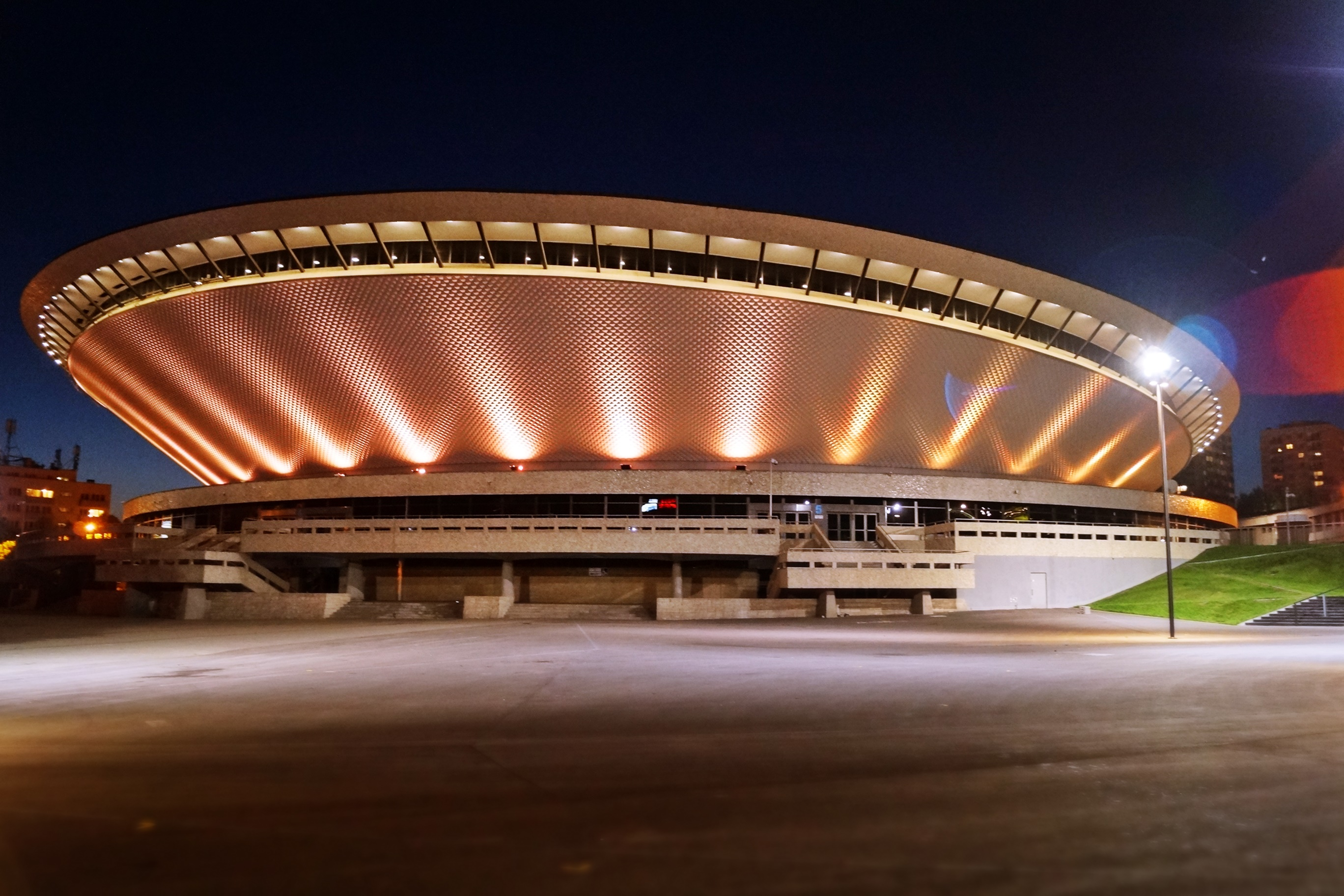
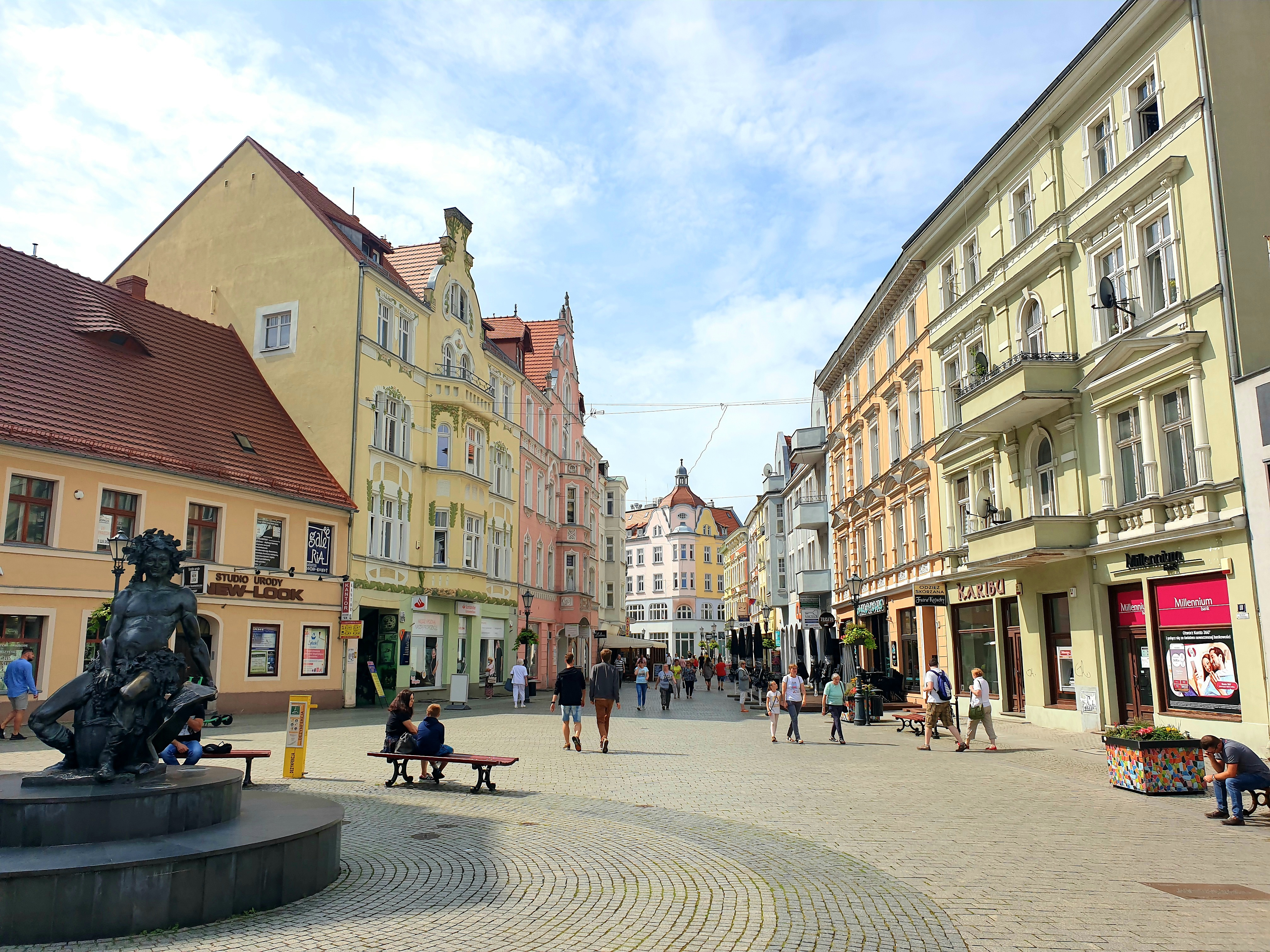
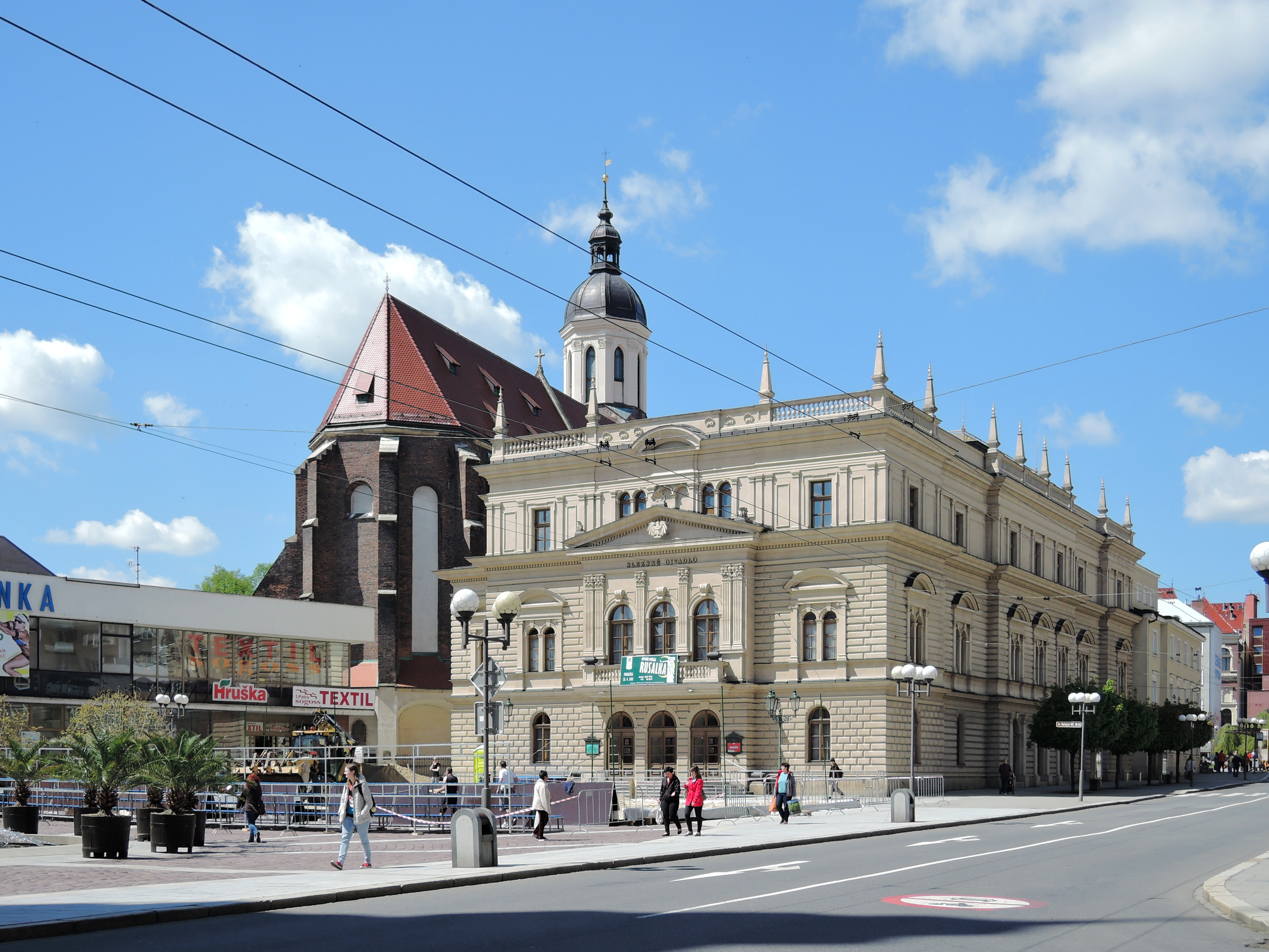
- Książ Castle Wrocław Old Town Opole Old Town Spodek, Katowice Zielona Góra Opava

- Coat of arms

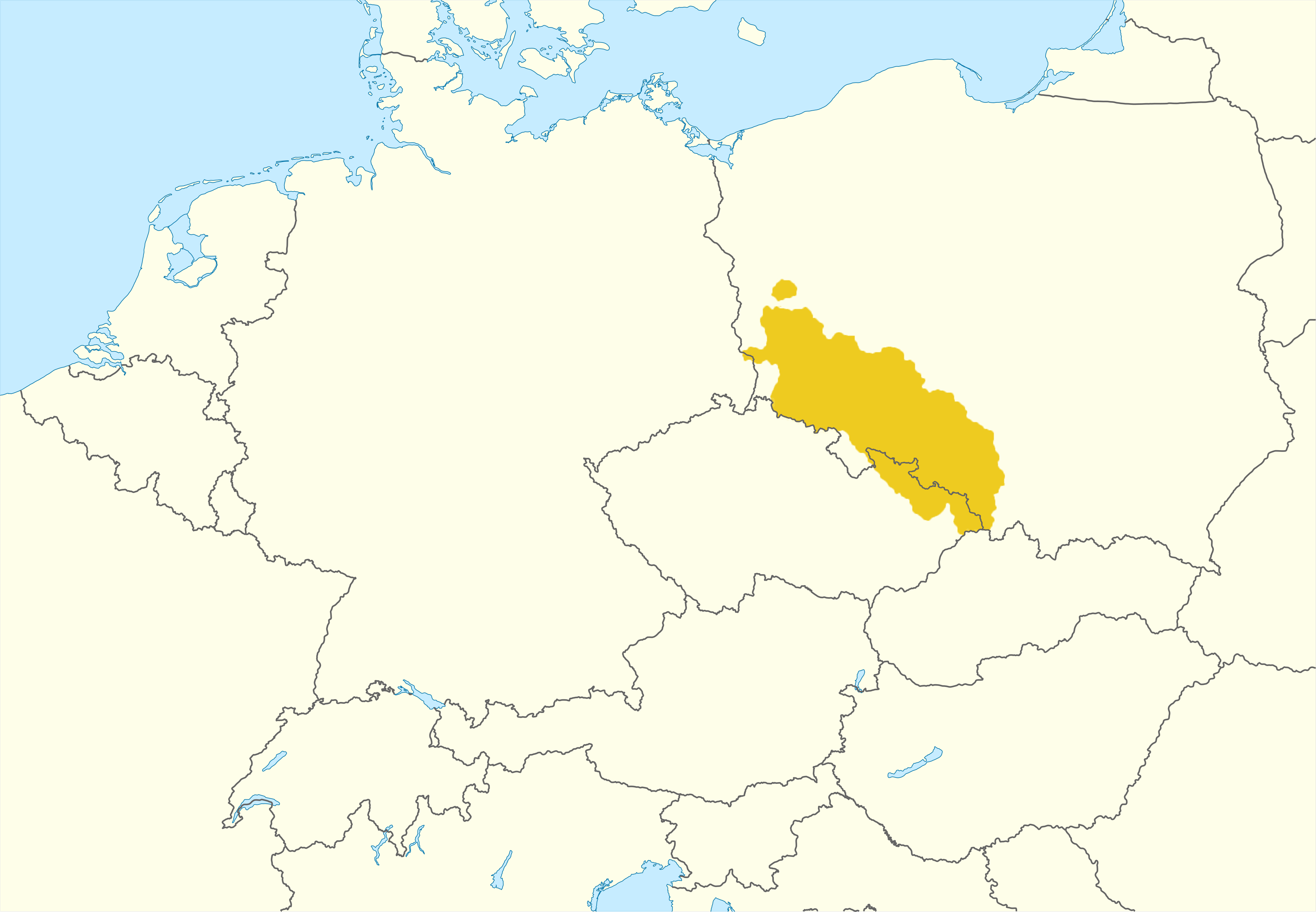
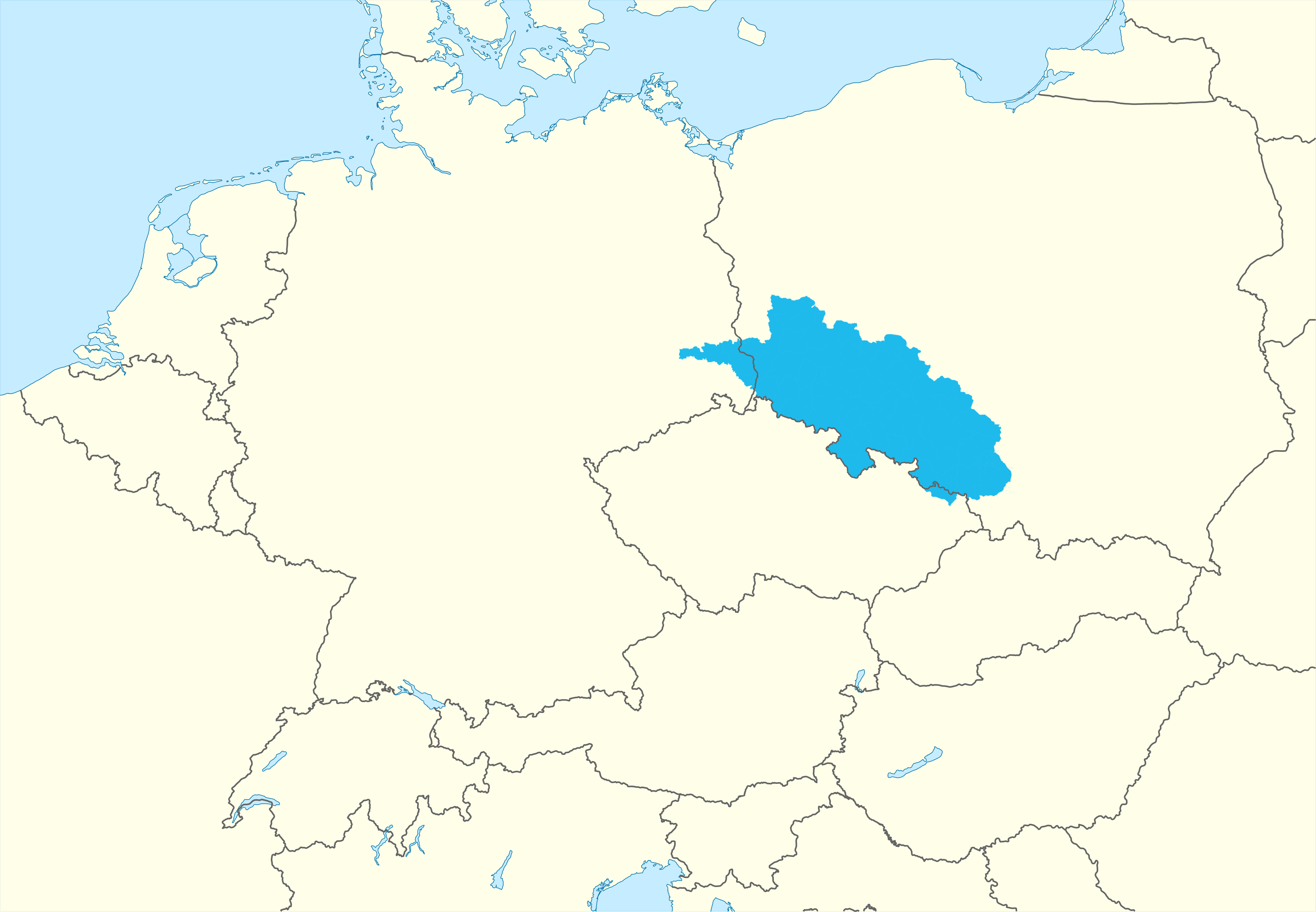
- Duchies & Province of Silesia on Central European map
- Coordinates: 51.6°N 17.2°E
- Country: Poland; Czech Republic; Germany
- Largest city: Wrocław
- Former seat: Wrocław (Lower Silesia); Opole (Upper Silesia)

Area
  - Total: 40,400 km^{2} (15,600 sq mi)

Population
  - Total: c. 8,000,000
  - Density: 200/km^{2} (520/sq mi)
- Demonym: Silesian
- Time zone: UTC+1 (CET)
  - Summer (DST): UTC+2 (CEST)

Silesia (Note: /saɪˈliːʒə, saɪˈliːʃiə/ sy-LEE-zhə, sy-LEE-shee-ə, UK also /saɪˈliːziə/ sy-LEE-zee-ə, US also /saɪˈliːʒiə, saɪˈliːʃə, sɪˈliː-/ sy-LEE-zhee-ə, sy-LEE-shə, sil-EE-.) (see names below) is a historical region of Central Europe that lies mostly within Poland, with small parts in the Czech Republic and Germany. Situated along the Oder River, with the Sudeten Mountains extending across the southern border, Silesia spans 40,000 km^{2} (15,400 sq mi), and its population is estimated at 8,000,000. It is split into two main subregions, Lower Silesia in the west and Upper Silesia in the east. The largest city and Lower Silesia's capital is Wrocław; the historic capital of Upper Silesia is Opole. The biggest metropolitan area is the Katowice metropolitan area, the centre of which is Katowice. Parts of the Czech city of Ostrava and the German city of Görlitz are situated within Silesia's historical borders.

Silesia is a heavily industrialised region, rich in natural resources, and its culture reflects its complex history and diverse influences, reflecting Polish, Czech, and German elements. The region is known for its distinctive Silesian language (still spoken by a minority in Upper Silesia), richly decorated folk costumes, regional cuisine, and a mix of Gothic, Baroque, and industrial-era architecture seen in its cities and towns. The region contains many historical landmarks and UNESCO World Heritage Sites. Silesia's borders and national affiliation have changed over time, both when it was a hereditary possession of noble houses and after the rise of modern nation-states, resulting in an abundance of castles and strongholds, especially in the Jelenia Góra valley.

First held by Great Moravia at the end of the 9th century and Bohemia in the early 10th century, Silesia was incorporated into the early Polish state, and after its fragmentation in the 12th century it formed the Duchy of Silesia. As a result of further fragmentation, it was divided into individual duchies, ruled by various lines of the Polish Piast dynasty. In the 14th century, it became a constituent part of the Bohemian Crown Lands under the Holy Roman Empire, which passed to the Austrian Habsburg Monarchy in 1526; however, a number of duchies remained under the rule of Polish dukes (Piast, Jagiellon, Sobieski) as formal Bohemian fiefdoms. As a result of the Silesian Wars, most of the region was annexed by Prussia from Austria in 1742 and subsequently became a part of the German Empire in 1871.

After World War I, when the Poles and Czechs regained their independence, the easternmost part of Upper Silesia and a part of Lower Silesia became again part of Poland by the decision of the Entente Powers after insurrections by Poles and the Upper Silesian plebiscite, while the remaining former Austrian parts of Silesia were divided between Czechoslovakia and Poland. During World War II, as a result of German occupation the entire region was under control of Nazi Germany. In 1945, after World War II, most of the German-held Silesia was transferred to Polish jurisdiction by the Potsdam Agreement between the victorious Allies and became part of Poland. The small Lusatian strip west of the Oder–Neisse line, which had belonged to Silesia since 1815, became part of East Germany. As the result of the forced population shifts of 1945–48, today's inhabitants of Silesia speak the national languages of their respective countries. (Note: Previously German-speaking Lower Silesia has developed a new mixed Polish dialect and novel costumes. There is ongoing debate about whether the Silesian language, common in Upper Silesia, should be considered a dialect of Polish or a separate language. The Lower Silesian German dialect is nearing extinction due to its speakers' expulsion.)

== Etymology ==
Mount Ślęża and Silesia are cognates, likely sharing a linguistic derivation

The names of Silesia in different languages most likely share their etymology—Polish: Śląsk [ɕlɔ̃sk]; German: Schlesien [ˈʃleːzi̯ən]; Czech: Slezsko [ˈslɛsko]; Lower Silesian: Schläsing; Silesian: Ślōnsk [ɕlonsk]; Lower Sorbian: Šlazyńska [ˈʃlazɨnʲska]; Upper Sorbian: Šleska [ˈʃlɛska]; Slovak: Sliezsko; Latin, Spanish and English: Silesia; Portuguese: Silésia; French: Silésie; Dutch: Silezië; Italian: Slesia. The names all relate to the name of a river (now Ślęza) and mountain (Mount Ślęża) in mid-southern Silesia, which served as a place of cult for pagans before Christianization.

Ślęża is listed as one of the numerous Pre-Indo-European topographic names in the region (see old European hydronymy). According to some Polonists, the name Ślęża [ˈɕlɛ̃ʐa] or Ślęż [ɕlɛ̃ʂ] is directly related to the Old Polish words ślęg [ɕlɛŋk] or śląg [ɕlɔŋk], which means dampness, moisture, or humidity. They disagree with the hypothesis of an origin for the name Śląsk from the name of the Silings tribe.

In Polish common usage, "Śląsk" refers to traditionally Polish Upper Silesia and today's Silesian Voivodeship, but less to Lower Silesia, which is different from Upper Silesia in many respects as its population was predominantly German-speaking from around the mid-19th century until 1945–48.

== History ==
=== Antiquity ===
In the fourth century BC from the south, through the Kłodzko Valley, the Celts entered Silesia, and settled around Mount Ślęża near modern Wrocław, Oława and Strzelin.

Germanic Lugii tribes were first recorded within Silesia in the 1st century BC. West Slavs and Lechites arrived in the region around the 7th century, and by the early ninth century, their settlements had stabilized. Local West Slavs started to erect boundary structures like the Silesian Przesieka and the Silesia Walls. The eastern border of Silesian settlement was situated to the west of the Bytom, and east from Racibórz and Cieszyn. East of this line dwelt a closely related Lechitic tribe, the Vistulans. Their northern border was in the valley of the Barycz River, north of which lived the Western Polans tribe who gave Poland its name.

=== 10th–13th century ===
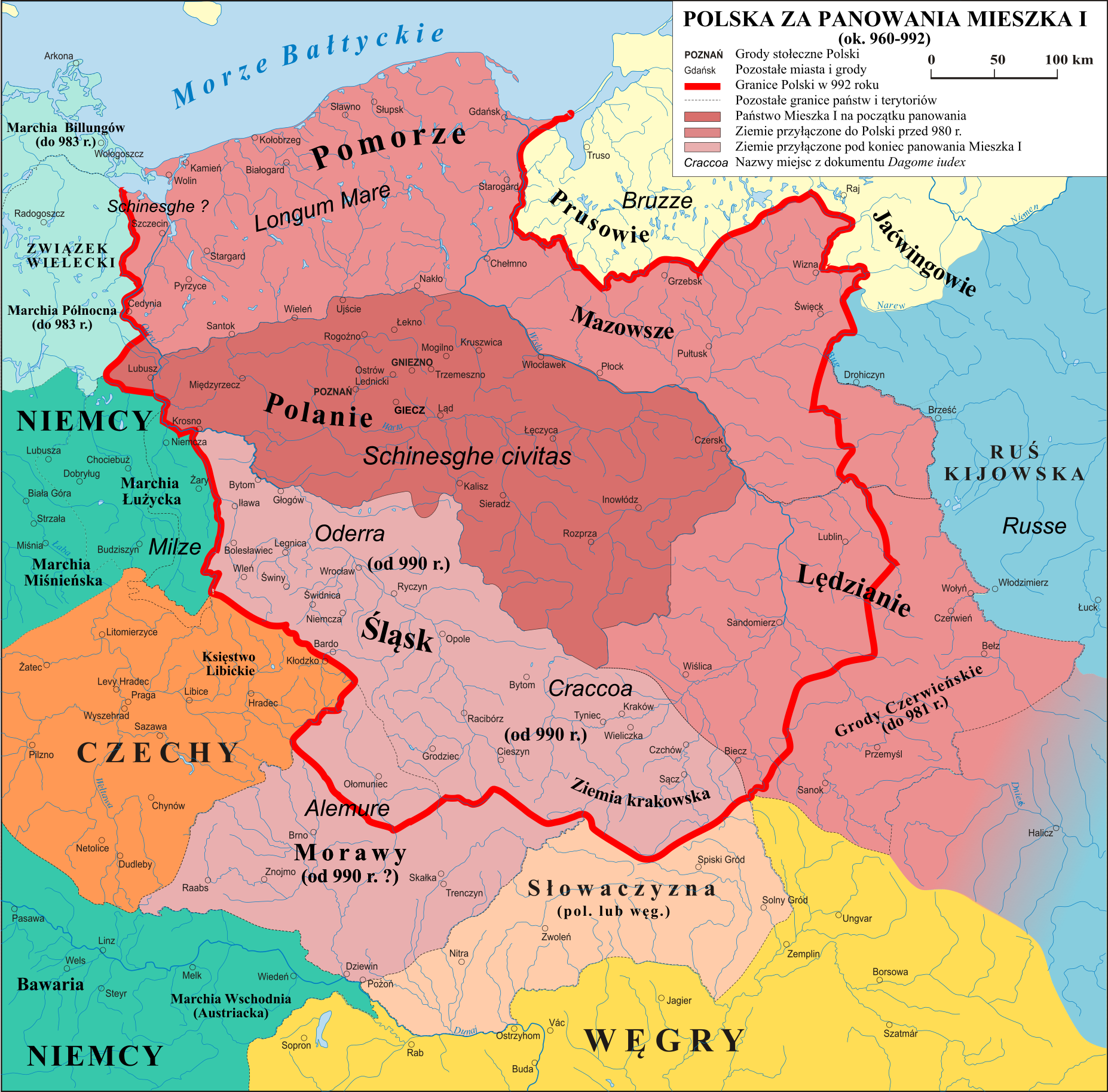
Map of Poland with Silesia (Śląsk) in the year 992, during the rule of Mieszko I

The first known states in Silesia were Greater Moravia and Bohemia. In the 10th century, the Polish ruler Mieszko I of the Piast dynasty incorporated Silesia into the newly established Polish state. In 1000, the Diocese of Wrocław was established as the oldest Catholic diocese in the region, and one of the oldest dioceses in Poland, subjugated to the Roman Catholic Archdiocese of Gniezno. Poland repulsed German invasions of Silesia in 1017 at Niemcza and in 1109 at Głogów. During the Fragmentation of Poland, Silesia and the rest of the country were divided into many smaller duchies ruled by various Silesian dukes. In 1178, parts of the Duchy of Kraków around Bytom, Oświęcim, Chrzanów, and Siewierz were transferred to the Silesian Piasts, although their population was primarily Vistulan and not of Silesian descent.

Walloons came to Silesia as one of the first foreign immigrant groups in Poland, probably settling in Wrocław since the 12th century, with further Walloon immigrants invited by Duke Henry the Bearded in the early 13th century. Since the 13th century, German cultural and ethnic influence increased as a result of immigration from German-speaking states of the Holy Roman Empire.

The first granting of municipal privileges in Poland took place in the region, in the town of Złotoryja by Henry the Bearded. Medieval municipal rights modeled after Lwówek Śląski and Środa Śląska, both established by Henry the Bearded, became the basis of municipal form of government for several cities and towns in Poland, and two of five local Polish variants of medieval town rights. The Book of Henryków, which contains the earliest known sentence written in the Polish language, as well as a document which contains the oldest printed text in Polish, were created in Henryków and Wrocław in Silesia, respectively.

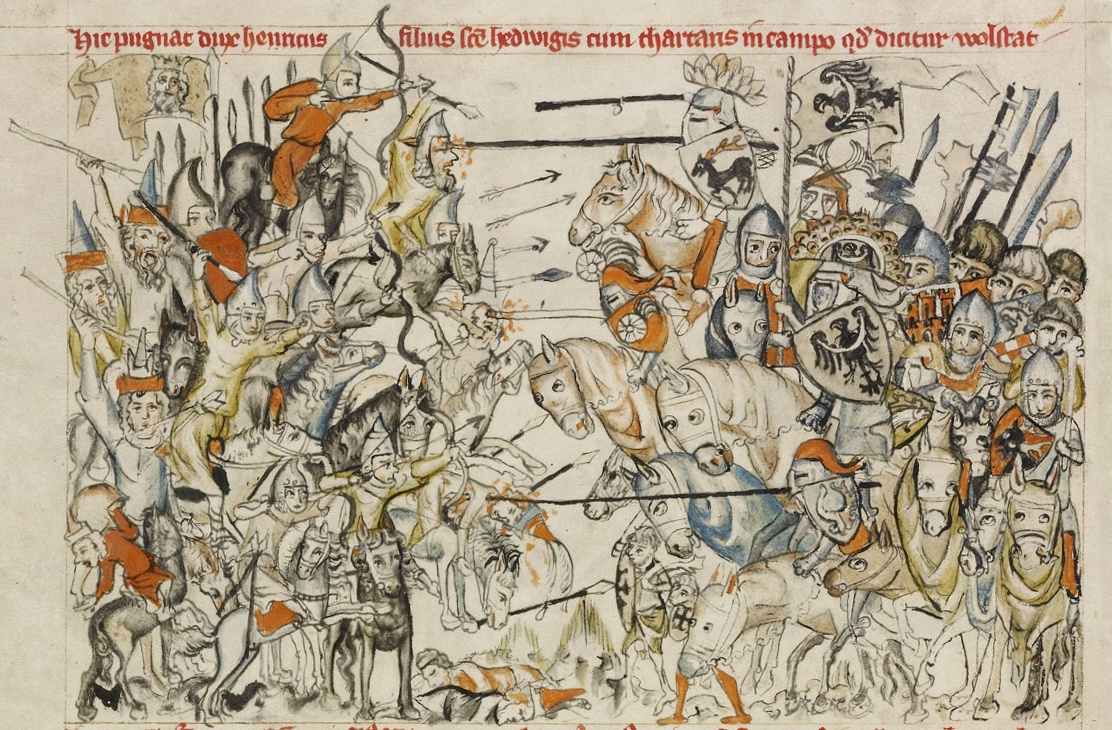
Battle of Legnica, during the first Mongol invasion of Poland, 1241

In 1241, the Mongols conducted their first invasion of Poland, causing widespread panic and mass flight. They looted much of the region and defeated the combined Polish, Moravian and German forces led by Duke Henry II the Pious at the Battle of Legnica, which took place at Legnickie Pole near the city of Legnica. Upon the death of Orda Khan, the Mongols chose not to press forward further into Europe, but returned east to participate in the election of a new Grand Khan (leader).

Between 1289 and 1292, Bohemian king Wenceslaus II became suzerain of some of the Upper Silesian duchies. Polish monarchs had not renounced their hereditary rights to Silesia until 1335. In 1319, Duchy of Jawor, the southwesternmost duchy of Silesia and fragmented Poland, under Duke Henry I of Jawor, expanded westward, reaching the towns of Görlitz/Zgorzelec, Senftenberg, Zittau and Ostritz. Silesia became part of the Bohemian Crown which was part of the Holy Roman Empire; however, a number of duchies remained under the rule of the Polish dukes from the houses of Piast, Jagiellon and Sobieski as formal Bohemian fiefdoms, some until the 17th–18th centuries. Between 1469 and 1490, the region was under the rule of Matthias Corvinus, who claimed the Bohemian throne. In 1526 Silesia passed with the Bohemian Crown to the Habsburg monarchy.

=== 15th–19th century ===
Map of Austrian and Prussian Silesia with modern national borders: Austrian Silesia, 1740 Prussian Silesia, 1871

In the 15th century, several changes were made to Silesia's borders. Parts of the territories that had been transferred to the Silesian Piasts in 1178 were bought by the Polish kings in the second half of the 15th century (the Duchy of Oświęcim in 1457; the Duchy of Zator in 1494). The Bytom area remained in the possession of the Silesian Piasts, though it was a part of the Diocese of Kraków. The Duchy of Krosno Odrzańskie (Crossen) was inherited by the Margraviate of Brandenburg in 1476 and with the renunciation of King Ferdinand I and the estates of Bohemia in 1538, became an integral part of Brandenburg. From 1645 until 1666, the Duchy of Opole and Racibórz was held in pawn by the Polish House of Vasa as dowry of the Polish queen Cecylia Renata.

In 1742, most of Silesia was seized by King Frederick II of Prussia in the War of the Austrian Succession, eventually becoming the Prussian Province of Silesia in 1815; consequently, Silesia became part of the German Empire when it was proclaimed in 1871. The Silesian capital Breslau became at that time one of the big cities in Germany. Breslau was a center of Jewish life in Germany and an important place of science (university) and industry (manufacturing of locomotives). German mass tourism started in the Silesian mountain region (Hirschberg, Schneekoppe).

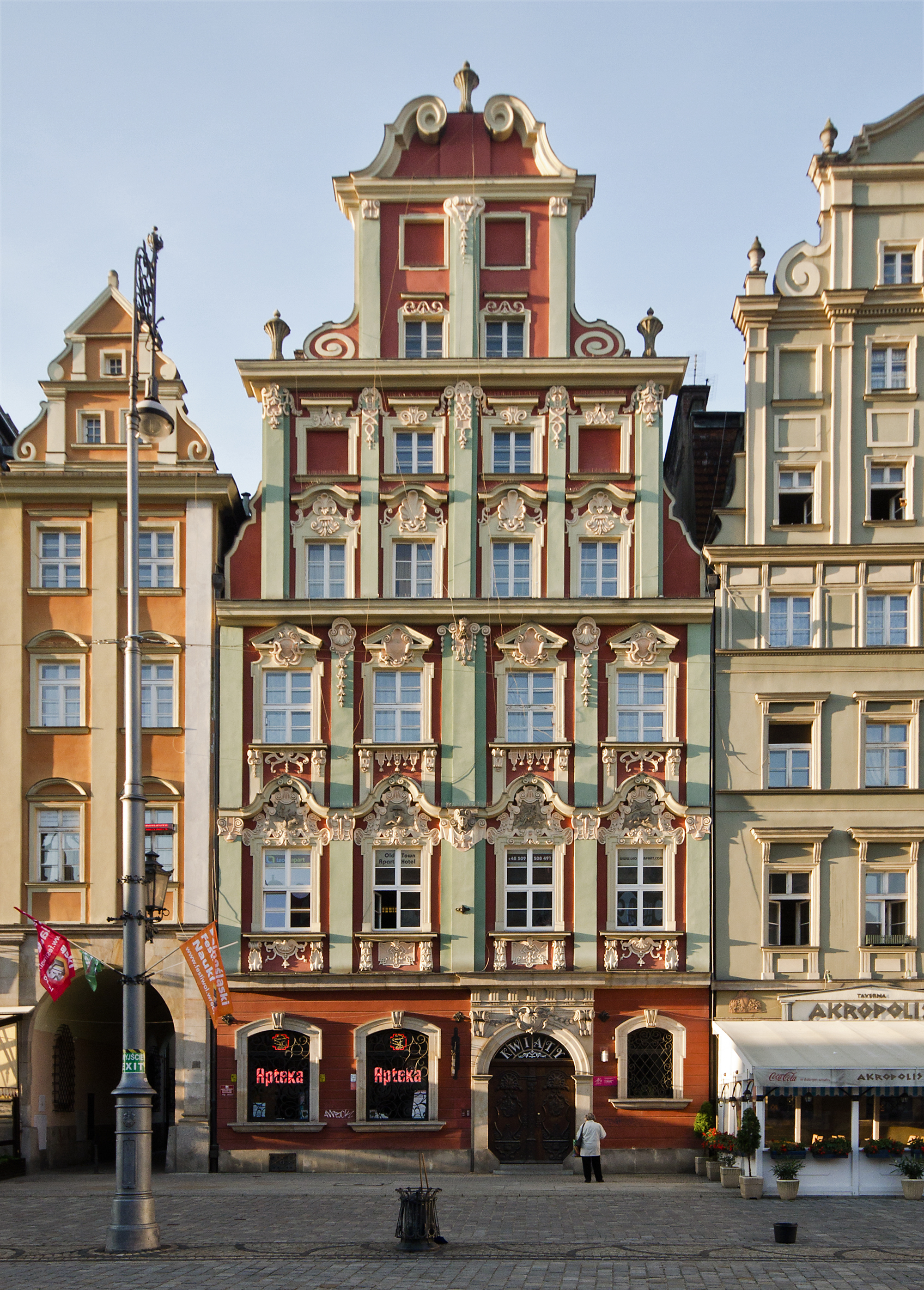
Typical Silesian baroque architecture in Wrocław

=== 20th century ===
After World War I, a part of Silesia, Upper Silesia, was contested by Germany and the newly independent Second Polish Republic. The League of Nations organized a plebiscite to decide the issue in 1921. It resulted in 60% of votes being cast for Germany and 40% for Poland. Following the third Silesian uprising (1921), however, the easternmost portion of Upper Silesia (including Katowice), with a majority ethnic Polish population, was awarded to Poland, becoming the Silesian Voivodeship. The Prussian Province of Silesia within Germany was then divided into the provinces of Lower Silesia and Upper Silesia. Meanwhile, Austrian Silesia, the small portion of Silesia retained by Austria after the Silesian Wars, was mostly awarded to the new Czechoslovakia (becoming known as Czech Silesia and Trans-Olza), although most of Cieszyn and territory to the east of it went to Poland.

Polish Silesia was among the first regions invaded during Germany's 1939 attack on Poland, which started World War II. The Polish and Jewish population of the then Polish part of Silesia was subjected expulsions, mass murder and deportation to Nazi concentration camps and forced labour camps, while Germans were settled in pursuit of Lebensraum. Two thousand Polish intellectuals, politicians, and businessmen were murdered in the Intelligenzaktion Schlesien in 1940 as part of a Poland-wide Germanization program. Silesia also housed one of the two main wartime centers where medical experiments were conducted on kidnapped Polish children by Nazis. Czech Silesia was occupied by Germany as part of Sudetenland. In Silesia, Nazi Germany operated the Gross-Rosen concentration camp, several prisoner-of-war camps for Allied POWs (including the major Stalag VIII-A, Stalag VIII-B, Stalag VIII-C camps), numerous Nazi prisons and thousands of forced labour camps, including a network of forced labour camps solely for Poles (Polenlager), subcamps of prisons, POW camps and of the Gross-Rosen and Auschwitz concentration camps.

The Potsdam Conference of 1945 defined the Oder-Neisse line as the border between Germany and Poland, pending a final peace conference with Germany which never took place. At the end of WWII, Germans in Silesia fled from the battle ground, assuming they would be able to return when the war was over. However, they could not return, and those who had stayed were expelled and a new Polish population, including people displaced from former Eastern Poland annexed by the Soviet Union and from Central Poland, joined the surviving native Polish inhabitants of the region. After 1945 and in 1946, nearly all of the 4.5 million Silesians of German descent fled, or were interned in camps and expelled, including some thousand German Jews who survived the Holocaust and had returned to Silesia. The newly formed Polish United Workers' Party created a Ministry of the Recovered Territories that claimed half of the available arable land for state-run collectivized farms. Many of the new Polish Silesians who resented the Germans for their invasion in 1939 and brutality in occupation now resented the newly formed Polish communist government for their population shifting and interference in agricultural and industrial affairs.

=== Contemporary (1945–present) ===
The administrative division of Silesia within Poland has changed several times since 1945. Since 1999, it has been divided between Lubusz Voivodeship, Lower Silesian Voivodeship, Opole Voivodeship, and Silesian Voivodeship. Czech Silesia is now part of the Czech Republic, forming part of the Moravian-Silesian Region and the northern part of the Olomouc Region. Germany retains the Silesia-Lusatia region (Niederschlesien-Oberlausitz or Schlesische Oberlausitz) west of the Neisse, which is part of the federal state of Saxony.

The region was affected by the 1997, 2010 and 2024 Central European floods.

== Ethnic history ==
Mother tongues of the Province of Silesia, according to the 1905 census

Modern Silesia is inhabited by Poles, Silesians, Germans, and Czechs. Germans first came to Silesia during the Late Medieval Ostsiedlung. The last Polish census of 2011 showed that the Silesians are the largest ethnic or national minority in Poland, Germans being the second; both groups are located mostly in Upper Silesia. The Czech part of Silesia is inhabited by Czechs, Moravians, Silesians, and Poles.

In the early 19th century the population of the Prussian part of Silesia was between 2/3 and 3/4 German-speaking, between 1/5 and 1/3 Polish-speaking, with Sorbs, Czechs, Moravians and Jews forming other smaller minorities (see Table 1. below).

Before the Second World War, Silesia was inhabited mostly by Germans, with Poles a large minority, forming a majority in Upper Silesia. Silesia was also the home of Czech and Jewish minorities. The German population tended to be based in the urban centres and in the rural areas to the north and west, whilst the Polish population was mostly rural and could be found in the east and in the south.

Table 1. Ethno-linguistic structure of Prussian Silesia in years 1787–1823
Ethnic group	acc. G. Hassel in 1819	%	acc. S. Plater in 1823	%	acc. T. Ładogórski in 1787	%
Germans	1,561,570	75.6	1,550,000	70.5	1,303,300	74.6
Poles	444,000	21.5	600,000	27.3	401,900	23.0
Sorbs	24,500	1.2	30,000	1.4	900	0.1
Czechs	5,500	0.3			32,600	1.9
Moravians	12,000	0.6				
Jews	16,916	0.8	20,000	0.9	8,900	0.5
Population	c. 2.1 million	100	c. 2.2 million	100	c. 1.8 million	100

Ethnic structure of Prussian Upper Silesia (Opole regency) during the 19th century and the early 20th century can be found in Table 2.:

Table 2. Numbers of Polish, German and other inhabitants (Regierungsbezirk Oppeln)
Year	1819	1831	1834	1837	1840	1843	1846	1852	1855	1858	1861	1867	1890	1900	1905	1910
Polish	377,100 (67.2%)	418,837 (62.0%)	468,691 (62.6%)	495,362 (62.1%)	525,395 (58.6%)	540,402 (58.1%)	568,582 (58.1%)	584,293 (58.6%)	590,248 (58.7%)	612,849 (57.3%)	665,865 (59.1%)	742,153 (59.8%)	918,728 (58.2%)	1,048,230 (56.1%)	1,158,805 (57.0%)	Census, monolingual Polish: 1,169,340 (53.0%) or up to 1,560,000 together with bilinguals
German	162,600 (29.0%)	257,852 (36.1%)	266,399 (35.6%)	290,168 (36.3%)	330,099 (36.8%)	348,094 (37.4%)	364,175 (37.2%)	363,990 (36.5%)	366,562 (36.5%)	406,950 (38.1%)	409,218 (36.3%)	457,545 (36.8%)	566,523 (35.9%)	684,397 (36.6%)	757,200 (37.2%)	884,045 (40.0%)
Other	21,503 (3.8%)	13,254 (1.9%)	13,120 (1.8%)	12,679 (1.6%)	41,570 (4.6%)	42,292 (4.5%)	45,736 (4.7%)	49,445 (4.9%)	48,270 (4.8%)	49,037 (4.6%)	51,187 (4.6%)	41,611 (3.4%)	92,480 (5.9%)	135,519 (7.3%)	117,651 (5.8%)	Total population: 2,207,981

The Austrian part of Silesia had a mixed German, Polish and Czech population, with Polish-speakers forming a majority in Cieszyn Silesia.

=== Religion ===
Religious confessions of the Province of Silesia, according to the 1905 census

Historically, Silesia was about equally split between Catholics and Protestants (overwhelmingly Lutherans). In an 1890 census taken in the German part, Catholics made up a slight majority of 53%, while the remaining 47% were almost entirely Lutheran. Geographically speaking, Upper Silesia was mostly Catholic except for some of its northwestern parts, which were predominantly Lutheran. Lower Silesia was mostly Lutheran except for the Glatzer Land (now Kłodzko County). Generally speaking, the population was mostly Protestant in the western parts, and it tended to be more Catholic the further east one went. In Upper Silesia, Protestants were concentrated in larger cities and often identified as German. After World War II, the religious demographics changed drastically as Germans, who constituted the bulk of the Protestant population, were expelled. Poles, who were mostly Catholic, were resettled in their place. Today, Silesia remains predominantly Catholic.

==== Jewish community ====
Existing since the 12th century, Silesia's Jewish community was concentrated around Wrocław and Upper Silesia, and numbered 48,003 (1.1% of the population) in 1890, decreasing to 44,985 persons (0.9%) by 1910. In Polish East Upper Silesia, the number of Jews was around 90,000–100,000. Historically, the community had suffered a number of localised expulsions such as their 1453 expulsion from Wrocław. From 1712 to 1820 a succession of men held the title Chief Rabbi of Silesia ("Landesrabbiner"): Naphtali ha-Kohen (1712–16); Samuel ben Naphtali (1716–22); Ḥayyim Jonah Te'omim (1722–1727); Baruch b. Reuben Gomperz (1733–54); Joseph Jonas Fränkel (1754–93); Jeremiah Löw Berliner (1793–99); Lewin Saul Fränkel (1800–7); Aaron Karfunkel (1807–16); and Abraham ben Gedaliah Tiktin (1816–20).

=== Consequences of World War II ===
After the German invasion of Poland in 1939, following Nazi racial policy, the Jewish population of Silesia was subjected to genocide with executions performed by Einsatzgruppe z. B.V. led by Udo von Woyrsch and Einsatzgruppe I led by Bruno Streckenbach, imprisonment in ghettos, and ethnic cleansing of the General Government. In their efforts to exterminate the Jews through murder and ethnic cleansing, the Germans established the Auschwitz and Gross-Rosen camps in the province of Silesia. Expulsions were carried out openly and reported in the local press. Those sent to ghettos would from 1942 be expelled to concentration and work camps. Between 5 May and 17 June, 20,000 Silesian Jews were sent to Birkenau to gas chambers and during August 1942, 10,000 to 13,000 Silesian Jews were murdered by gassing at Auschwitz. Most Jews in Silesia were exterminated by the Nazis. After the war Silesia became a major centre for repatriation of the Jewish population in Poland which survived Nazi German extermination and in autumn 1945, 15,000 Jews were in Lower Silesia, mostly Polish Jews returned from territories now belonging to the Soviet Union, rising in 1946 to seventy thousand as Jewish survivors from other regions in Poland were relocated.

The majority of Germans fled or were expelled from the present-day Polish and Czech parts of Silesia during and after World War II. From June 1945 to January 1947, 1.77 million Germans were expelled from Lower Silesia, and 310,000 from Upper Silesia. Today, most German Silesians and their descendants live in the territory of the Federal Republic of Germany, many of them in the Ruhr area working as miners, like their ancestors in Silesia. One of its most notable but controversial spokesmen was the Christian Democratic Union politician Herbert Hupka.

The expulsion of Germans led to widespread underpopulation. The population of the town of Głogów fell from 33,500 to 5,000, and from 1939 to 1966 the population of Wrocław fell by 25%. Attempts to repopulate Silesia proved unsuccessful in the 1940s and 1950s, and Silesia's population did not reach pre-war levels until the late 1970s. The Polish settlers who repopulated Silesia were partly from the former Polish Eastern Borderlands, which was annexed by the Soviet Union in 1939. Wrocław was partly repopulated with refugees from the formerly Polish city of Lwów.

== Geography ==
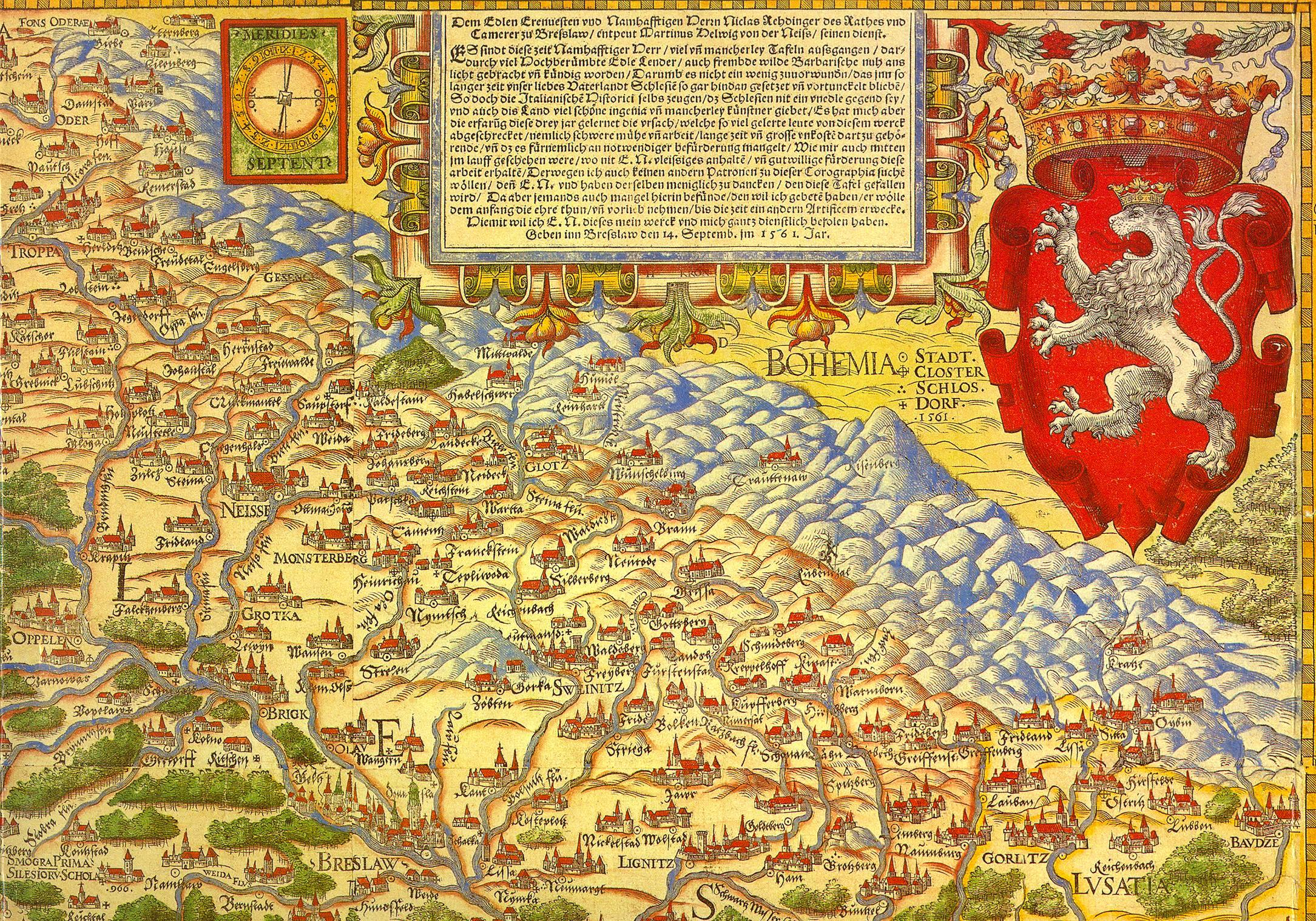
First map of Silesia by Martin Helwig, 1561; north at the bottom

Physical map of the Province of Silesia in 1905

Most of Silesia is relatively flat, although its southern border is generally mountainous. It is primarily located in a swath running along both banks of the upper and middle Oder (Odra) River, but it extends eastwards to the upper Vistula River. The region also includes many tributaries of the Oder, including the Bóbr (and its tributary the Kwisa), the Barycz and the Nysa Kłodzka. The Sudeten Mountains run along most of the southern edge of the region, though at its south-eastern extreme it reaches the Silesian Beskids and Moravian-Silesian Beskids, which belong to the Carpathian Mountains range.

Historically, Silesia was bounded to the west by the Kwisa and Bóbr Rivers, while the territory west of the Kwisa was in Upper Lusatia (earlier Milsko). However, because part of Upper Lusatia was included in the Province of Silesia in 1815, in Germany Görlitz, Niederschlesischer Oberlausitzkreis and neighbouring areas are considered parts of historical Silesia. Those districts, along with Poland's Lower Silesian Voivodeship and parts of Lubusz Voivodeship, make up the geographic region of Lower Silesia.

Silesia has undergone a similar notional extension at its eastern extreme. Historically, it extended only as far as the Brynica River, which separates it from Zagłębie Dąbrowskie in the Lesser Poland region. However, to many Poles today, Silesia (Śląsk) is understood to cover all of the area around Katowice, including Zagłębie. This interpretation is given official sanction in the use of the name Silesian Voivodeship (województwo śląskie) for the province covering this area. In fact, the word Śląsk in Polish (when used without qualification) now commonly refers exclusively to this area (also called Górny Śląsk or Upper Silesia).

As well as the Katowice area, historical Upper Silesia also includes the Opole region (Poland's Opole Voivodeship) and Czech Silesia. Czech Silesia consists of a part of the Moravian-Silesian Region and the Jeseník District in the Olomouc Region.

=== Natural resources ===
Silesia is a resource-rich and populous region. Since the middle of the 18th century, coal has been mined. The industry had grown while Silesia was part of Germany, and peaked in the 1970s under the People's Republic of Poland. During this period, Silesia became one of the world's largest producers of coal, with a record tonnage in 1979. Coal mining declined during the next two decades, but has increased again following the end of Communist rule.

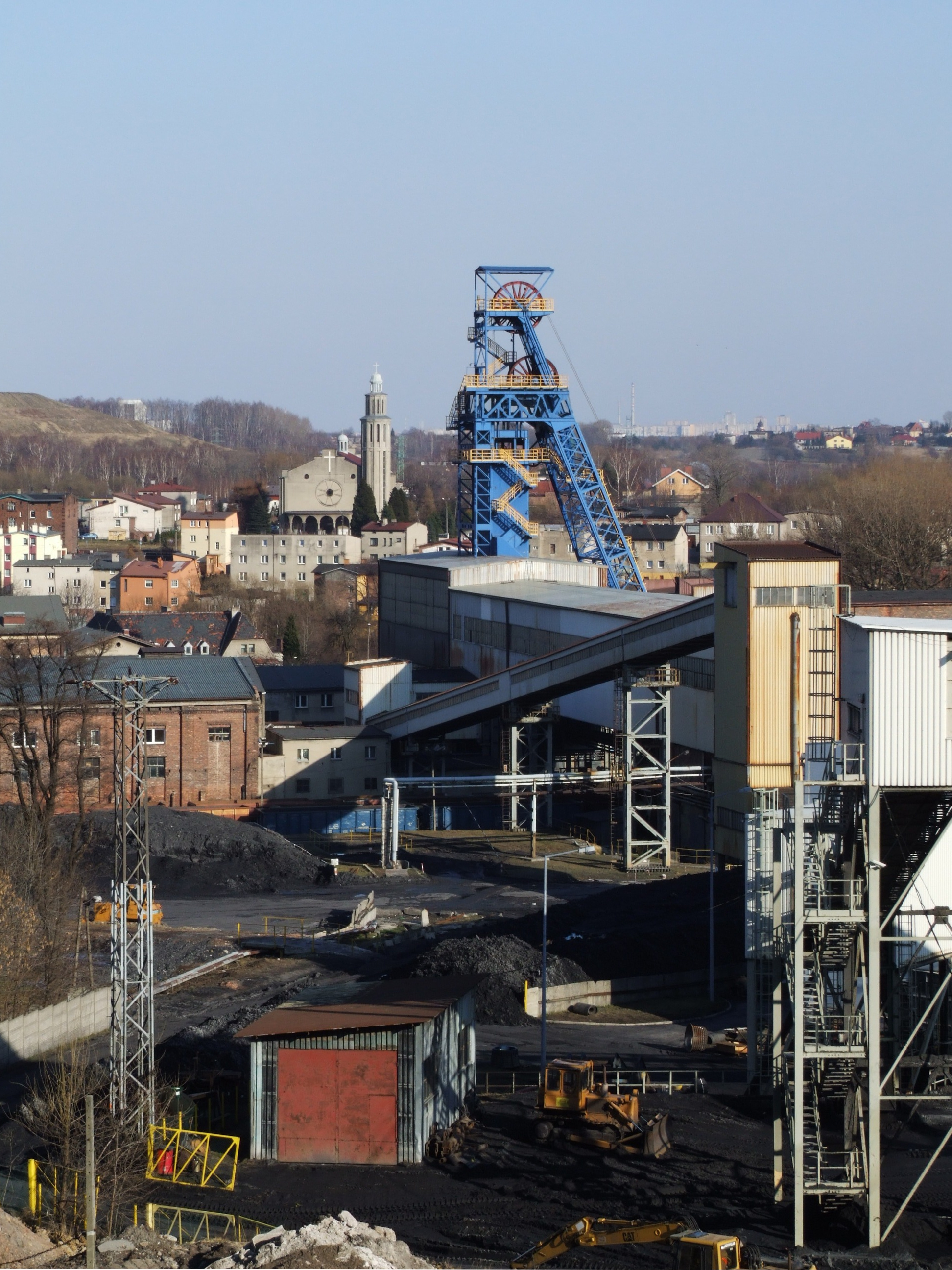
Bolesław Śmiały Coal Mine, Łaziska Górne

The 41 coal mines in Silesia are mostly part of the Upper Silesian Coal Basin, which lies in the Silesian Upland. The coalfield has an area of about 4,500 km^{2} (1,700 mi^{2}). Deposits in Lower Silesia have proven to be difficult to exploit and the area's unprofitable mines were closed in 2000. In 2008, an estimated 35 billion tonnes of lignite reserves were found near Legnica, making them some of the largest in the world.

From the fourth century BC, iron ore has been mined in the upland areas of Silesia. The same period had lead, copper, silver, and gold mining. Zinc, cadmium, arsenic, and uranium have also been mined in the region. Lower Silesia features large copper mining and processing between the cities of Legnica, Głogów, Lubin, and Polkowice. In the Middle Ages, gold (Polish: złoto) and silver (Polish: srebro) were mined in the region, which is reflected in the names of the former mining towns of Złotoryja, Złoty Stok and Srebrna Góra.

The region is known for stone quarrying to produce limestone, marl, marble, and basalt.

Annual production of minerals in Silesia
Mineral name	Production (tonnes)	Ref.
Bituminous coal	95,000,000	
Copper	571,000	
Zinc	160,000	
Silver	1,200	
Cadmium	500	
Lead	70,000	

The region also has a thriving agricultural sector, which produces cereals (wheat, rye, barley, oats, corn), potatoes, rapeseed, sugar beets and others. Milk production is well developed. The Opole Silesia has for decades occupied the top spot in Poland for their indices of effectiveness of agricultural land use.

Mountainous parts of southern Silesia feature many significant and attractive tourism destinations (e.g., Karpacz, Szczyrk, Wisła). Silesia is generally well forested. This is because greenness is generally highly desirable by the local population, particularly in the highly industrialized parts of Silesia.

== Demographics ==
Silesia has been historically diverse in every aspect. Nowadays, the largest part of Silesia is located in Poland; it is often cited as one of the most diverse regions in that country.

The United States Immigration Commission, in its Dictionary of Races or Peoples (published in 1911, during a period of intense immigration from Silesia to the United States), considered Silesian as a geographical (not ethnic) term, denoting the inhabitants of Silesia. It is also mentioned the existence of both Polish Silesian and German Silesian dialects in that region.

=== Cities and towns ===
The following table includes the cities and towns in Silesia with a population greater than 20,000 (2026).

	Name	Population	Area	Country	Administrative	Historic subregion
1	Wrocław	672,601	293 km^{2} (113 sq mi)	(Poland)	Lower Silesian Voivodeship	Lower Silesia
2	Ostrava*	280,853	214 km^{2} (83 sq mi)	(Czech Republic)	Moravian-Silesian Region	Czech Silesia/Moravia
3	Katowice	277,415	165 km^{2} (64 sq mi)	(Poland)	Silesian Voivodeship	Upper Silesia
4	Gliwice	166,942	134 km^{2} (52 sq mi)	(Poland)	Silesian Voivodeship	Upper Silesia
5	Bielsko-Biała*	163,164	125 km^{2} (48 sq mi)	(Poland)	Silesian Voivodeship	Upper Silesia/Lesser Poland
6	Zabrze	150,780	80 km^{2} (31 sq mi)	(Poland)	Silesian Voivodeship	Upper Silesia
7	Bytom	144,598	69 km^{2} (27 sq mi)	(Poland)	Silesian Voivodeship	Upper Silesia
8	Zielona Góra	138,476	58 km^{2} (22 sq mi)	(Poland)	Lubusz Voivodeship	Lower Silesia
9	Rybnik	128,788	148 km^{2} (57 sq mi)	(Poland)	Silesian Voivodeship	Upper Silesia
10	Ruda Śląska	127,601	78 km^{2} (30 sq mi)	(Poland)	Silesian Voivodeship	Upper Silesia
11	Opole	126,623	97 km^{2} (37 sq mi)	(Poland)	Opole Voivodeship	Upper Silesia
12	Tychy	120,081	82 km^{2} (32 sq mi)	(Poland)	Silesian Voivodeship	Upper Silesia
13	Chorzów	98,418	33 km^{2} (13 sq mi)	(Poland)	Silesian Voivodeship	Upper Silesia
14	Wałbrzych	97,546	85 km^{2} (33 sq mi)	(Poland)	Lower Silesian Voivodeship	Lower Silesia
15	Legnica	89,919	56 km^{2} (22 sq mi)	(Poland)	Lower Silesian Voivodeship	Lower Silesia
16	Jastrzębie-Zdrój	80,527	85 km^{2} (33 sq mi)	(Poland)	Silesian Voivodeship	Upper Silesia
17	Jelenia Góra	73,470	109 km^{2} (42 sq mi)	(Poland)	Lower Silesian Voivodeship	Lower Silesia
18	Mysłowice	70,160	66 km^{2} (25 sq mi)	(Poland)	Silesian Voivodeship	Upper Silesia
19	Havířov	67,998	32 km^{2} (12 sq mi)	(Czech Republic)	Moravian-Silesian Region	Czech Silesia
20	Lubin	65,961	41 km^{2} (16 sq mi)	(Poland)	Lower Silesian Voivodeship	Lower Silesia
21	Siemianowice Śląskie	62,311	25 km^{2} (10 sq mi)	(Poland)	Silesian Voivodeship	Upper Silesia
22	Żory	61,857	65 km^{2} (25 sq mi)	(Poland)	Silesian Voivodeship	Upper Silesia
23	Tarnowskie Góry	61,001	84 km^{2} (32 sq mi)	(Poland)	Silesian Voivodeship	Upper Silesia
24	Głogów	60,605	35 km^{2} (14 sq mi)	(Poland)	Lower Silesian Voivodeship	Lower Silesia
25	Görlitz**	55,186	68 km^{2} (26 sq mi)	(Germany)	Saxony	Lower Silesia (Note: Historically part of Lusatia, Görlitz and Zgorzelec were considered part of Lower Silesia in the years 1319–1329 and 1815–1945.)
26	Opava	54,881	91 km^{2} (35 sq mi)	(Czech Republic)	Moravian-Silesian Region	Czech Silesia
27	Frýdek-Místek*	53,164	52 km^{2} (20 sq mi)	(Czech Republic)	Moravian-Silesian Region	Czech Silesia/Moravia
28	Kędzierzyn-Koźle	53,140	124 km^{2} (48 sq mi)	(Poland)	Opole Voivodeship	Upper Silesia
29	Świdnica	51,357	22 km^{2} (8 sq mi)	(Poland)	Lower Silesian Voivodeship	Lower Silesia
30	Piekary Śląskie	51,030	40 km^{2} (15 sq mi)	(Poland)	Silesian Voivodeship	Upper Silesia
31	Racibórz	48,750	75 km^{2} (29 sq mi)	(Poland)	Silesian Voivodeship	Upper Silesia
32	Karviná	48,684	58 km^{2} (22 sq mi)	(Czech Republic)	Moravian-Silesian Region	Czech Silesia
33	Świętochłowice	44,621	13 km^{2} (5 sq mi)	(Poland)	Silesian Voivodeship	Upper Silesia
34	Wodzisław Śląski	44,017	50 km^{2} (19 sq mi)	(Poland)	Silesian Voivodeship	Upper Silesia
35	Mikołów	41,478	79 km^{2} (31 sq mi)	(Poland)	Silesian Voivodeship	Upper Silesia
36	Nysa	39,887	27 km^{2} (10 sq mi)	(Poland)	Opole Voivodeship	Lower Silesia
37	Bolesławiec	36,642	24 km^{2} (9 sq mi)	(Poland)	Lower Silesian Voivodeship	Lower Silesia
38	Nowa Sól	35,230	22 km^{2} (8 sq mi)	(Poland)	Lubusz Voivodeship	Lower Silesia
39	Knurów	34,919	34 km^{2} (13 sq mi)	(Poland)	Silesian Voivodeship	Upper Silesia
40	Oleśnica	34,676	21 km^{2} (8 sq mi)	(Poland)	Lower Silesian Voivodeship	Lower Silesia
41	Czechowice-Dziedzice	34,564	33 km^{2} (13 sq mi)	(Poland)	Silesian Voivodeship	Upper Silesia
42	Třinec	33,523	85 km^{2} (33 sq mi)	(Czech Republic)	Moravian-Silesian Region	Czech Silesia
43	Oława	32,928	27 km^{2} (10 sq mi)	(Poland)	Lower Silesian Voivodeship	Lower Silesia
44	Brzeg	32,724	15 km^{2} (6 sq mi)	(Poland)	Opole Voivodeship	Lower Silesia
45	Cieszyn	32,217	29 km^{2} (11 sq mi)	(Poland)	Silesian Voivodeship	Upper Silesia
46	Hoyerswerda**	30,759	96 km^{2} (37 sq mi)	(Germany)	Saxony	Lower Silesia (Note: Historically part of Lusatia, Hoyerswerda was considered part of Lower Silesia in the years 1825–1945.)
47	Dzierżoniów	30,014	20 km^{2} (8 sq mi)	(Poland)	Lower Silesian Voivodeship	Lower Silesia
48	Zgorzelec**	28,095	16 km^{2} (6 sq mi)	(Poland)	Lower Silesian Voivodeship	Lower Silesia
49	Bielawa	27,480	36 km^{2} (14 sq mi)	(Poland)	Lower Silesian Voivodeship	Lower Silesia
50	Orlová	27,383	25 km^{2} (10 sq mi)	(Czech Republic)	Moravian-Silesian Region	Czech Silesia
51	Lubliniec	22,931	89 km^{2} (34 sq mi)	(Poland)	Silesian Voivodeship	Upper Silesia
52	Český Těšín	22,870	34 km^{2} (13 sq mi)	(Czech Republic)	Moravian-Silesian Region	Czech Silesia
53	Żagań	22,800	40 km^{2} (15 sq mi)	(Poland)	Lubusz Voivodeship	Lower Silesia
54	Krnov	22,303	44 km^{2} (17 sq mi)	(Czech Republic)	Moravian-Silesian Region	Czech Silesia
55	Orzesze	22,242	84 km^{2} (32 sq mi)	(Poland)	Silesian Voivodeship	Upper Silesia
56	Świebodzice	21,469	30 km^{2} (12 sq mi)	(Poland)	Lower Silesian Voivodeship	Lower Silesia
57	Kluczbork	21,232	12 km^{2} (5 sq mi)	(Poland)	Opole Voivodeship	Lower Silesia
58	Polkowice	20,832	24 km^{2} (9 sq mi)	(Poland)	Lower Silesian Voivodeship	Lower Silesia
59	Łaziska Górne	20,826	21 km^{2} (8 sq mi)	(Poland)	Silesian Voivodeship	Upper Silesia
60	Świebodzin	20,480	11 km^{2} (4 sq mi)	(Poland)	Lubusz Voivodeship	Lower Silesia
61	Bohumín	20,234	31 km^{2} (12 sq mi)	(Czech Republic)	Moravian-Silesian Region	Czech Silesia

* Only part in Silesia

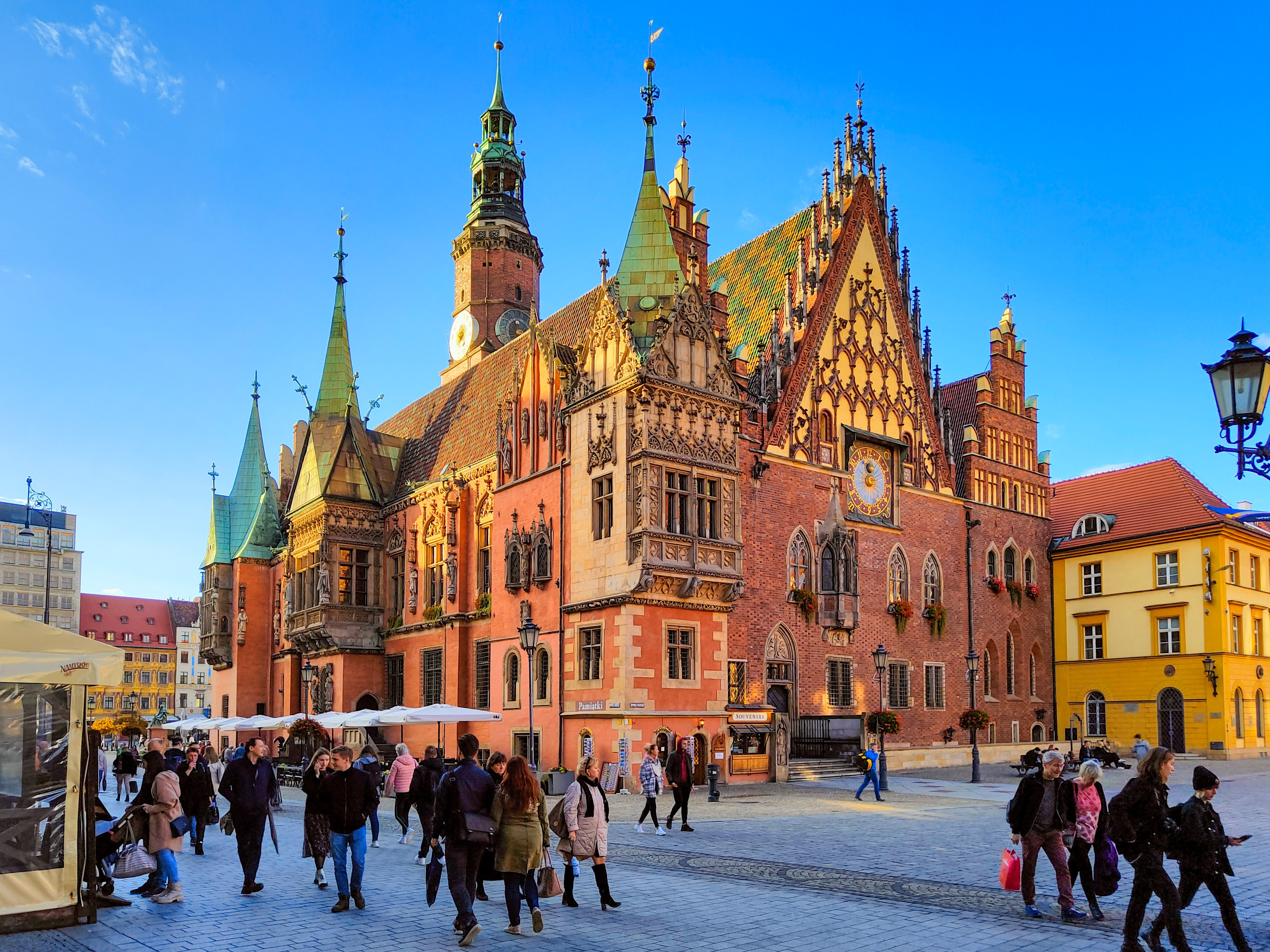
Wrocław

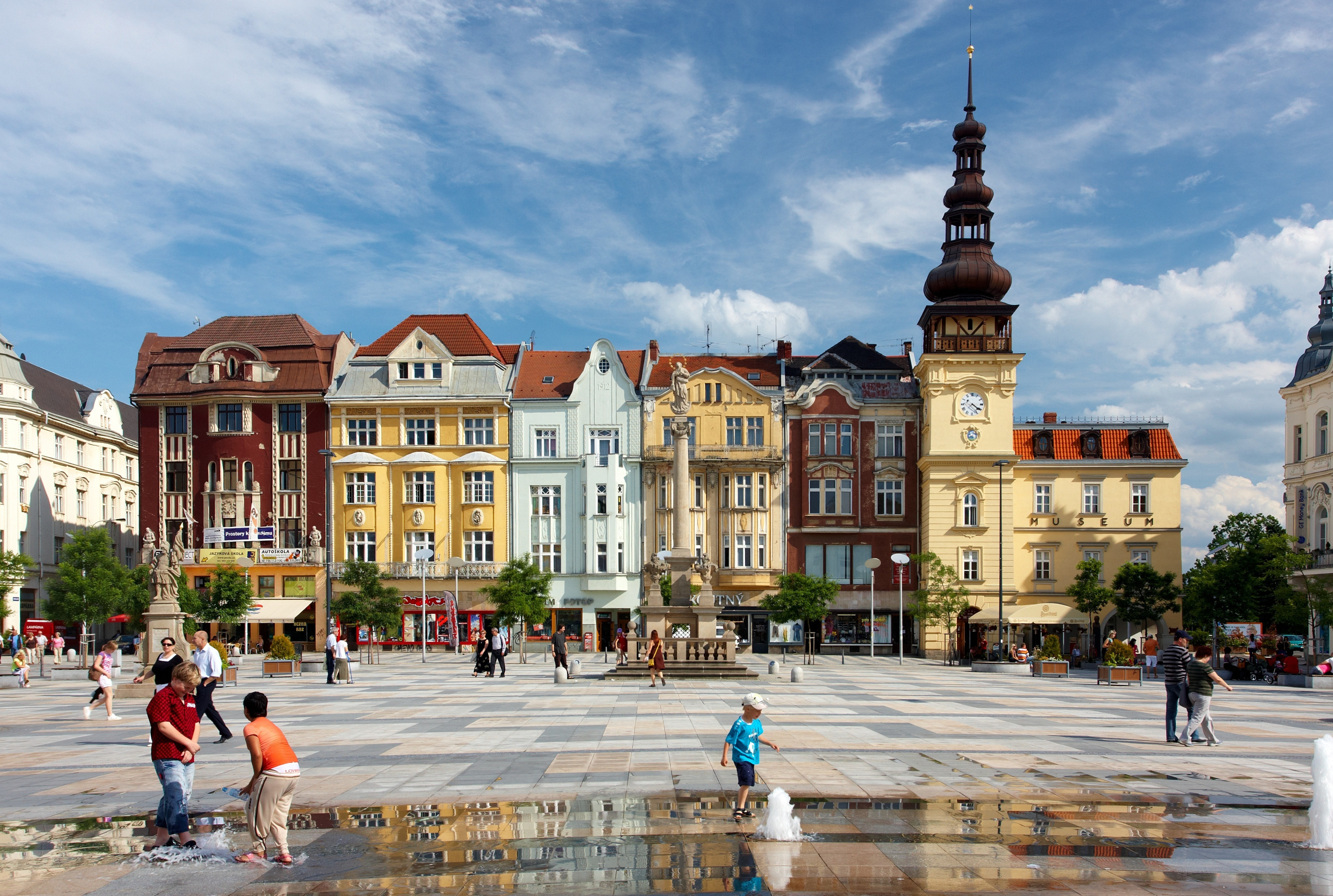
Ostrava

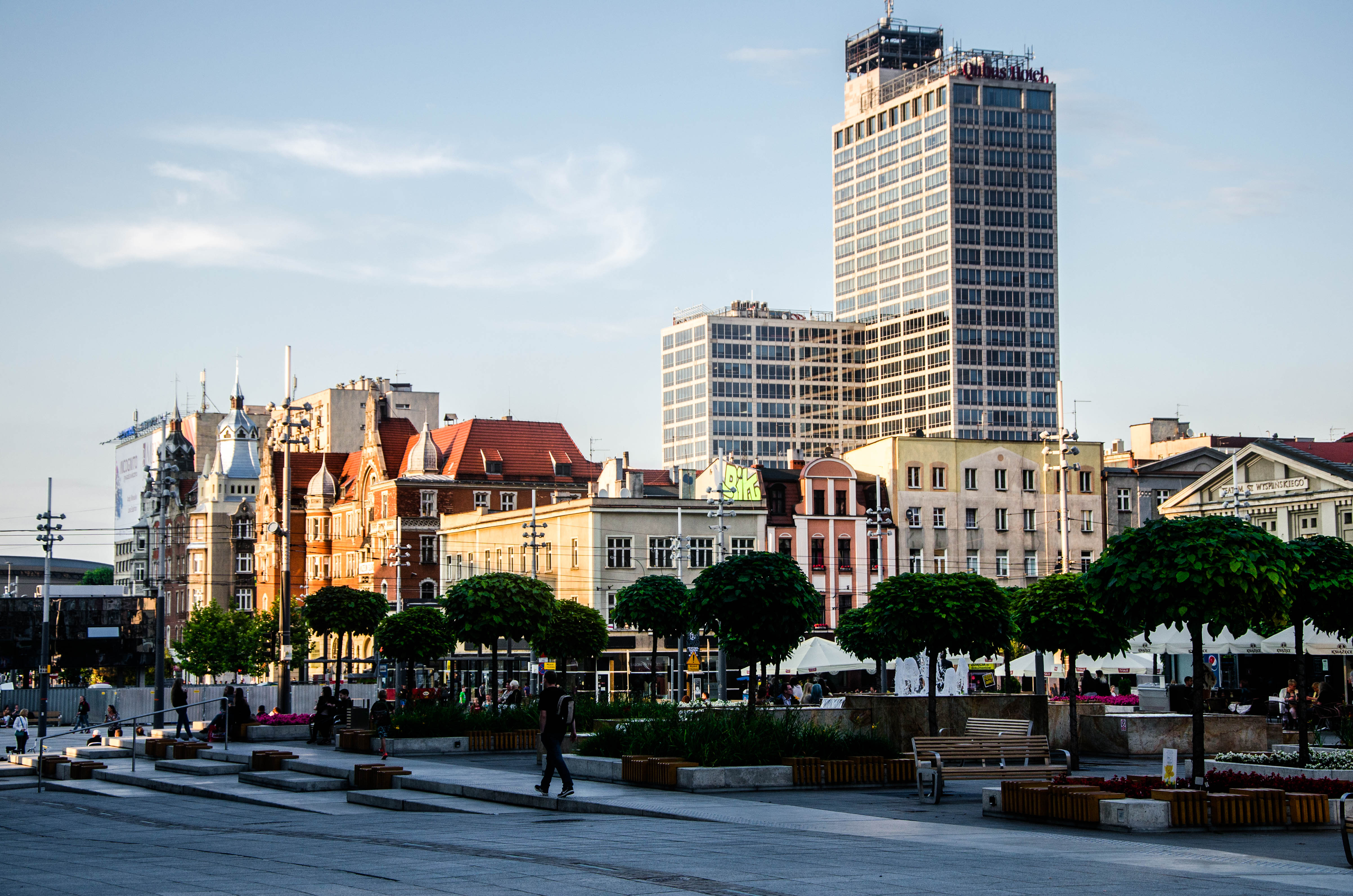
Katowice

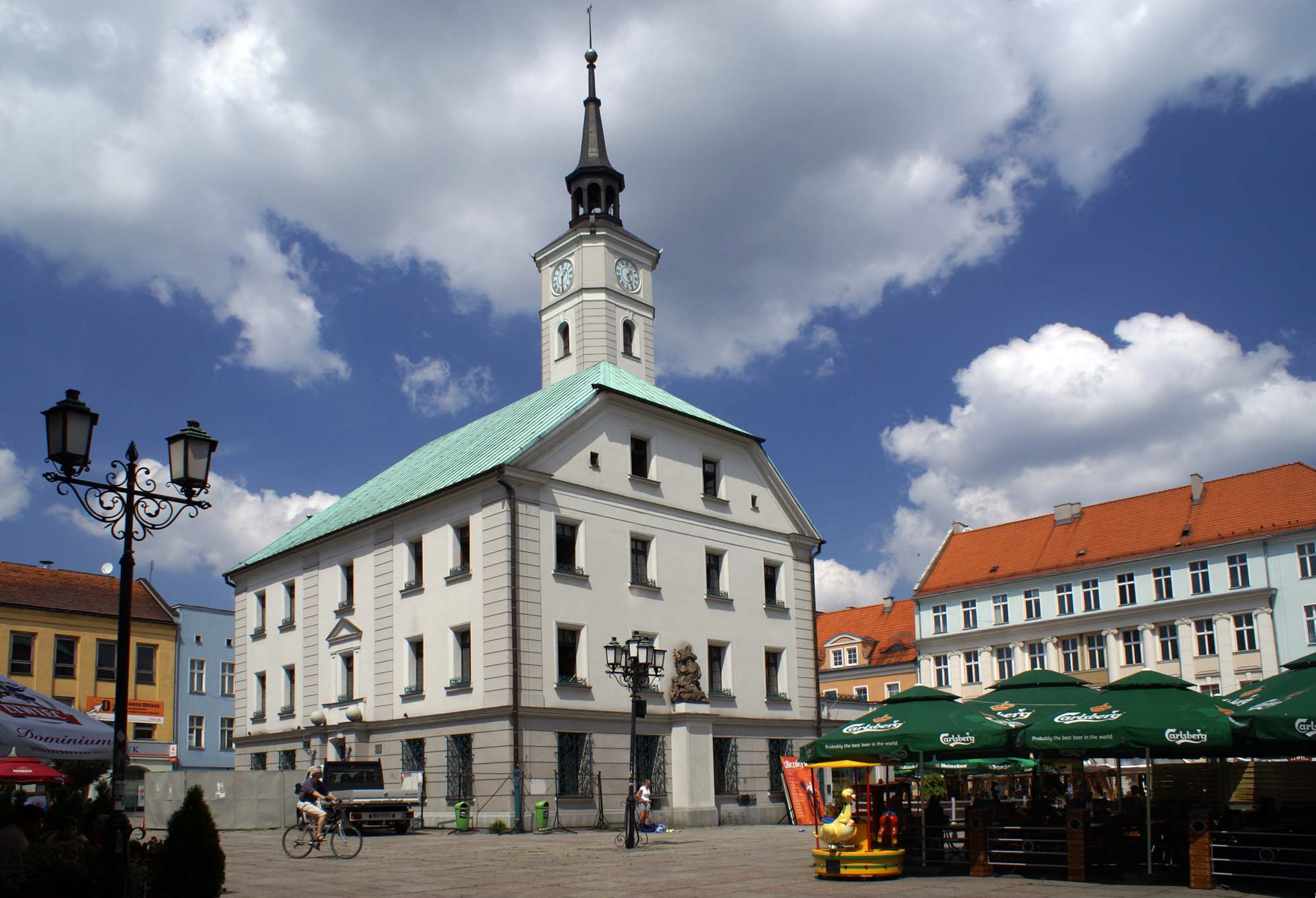
Gliwice

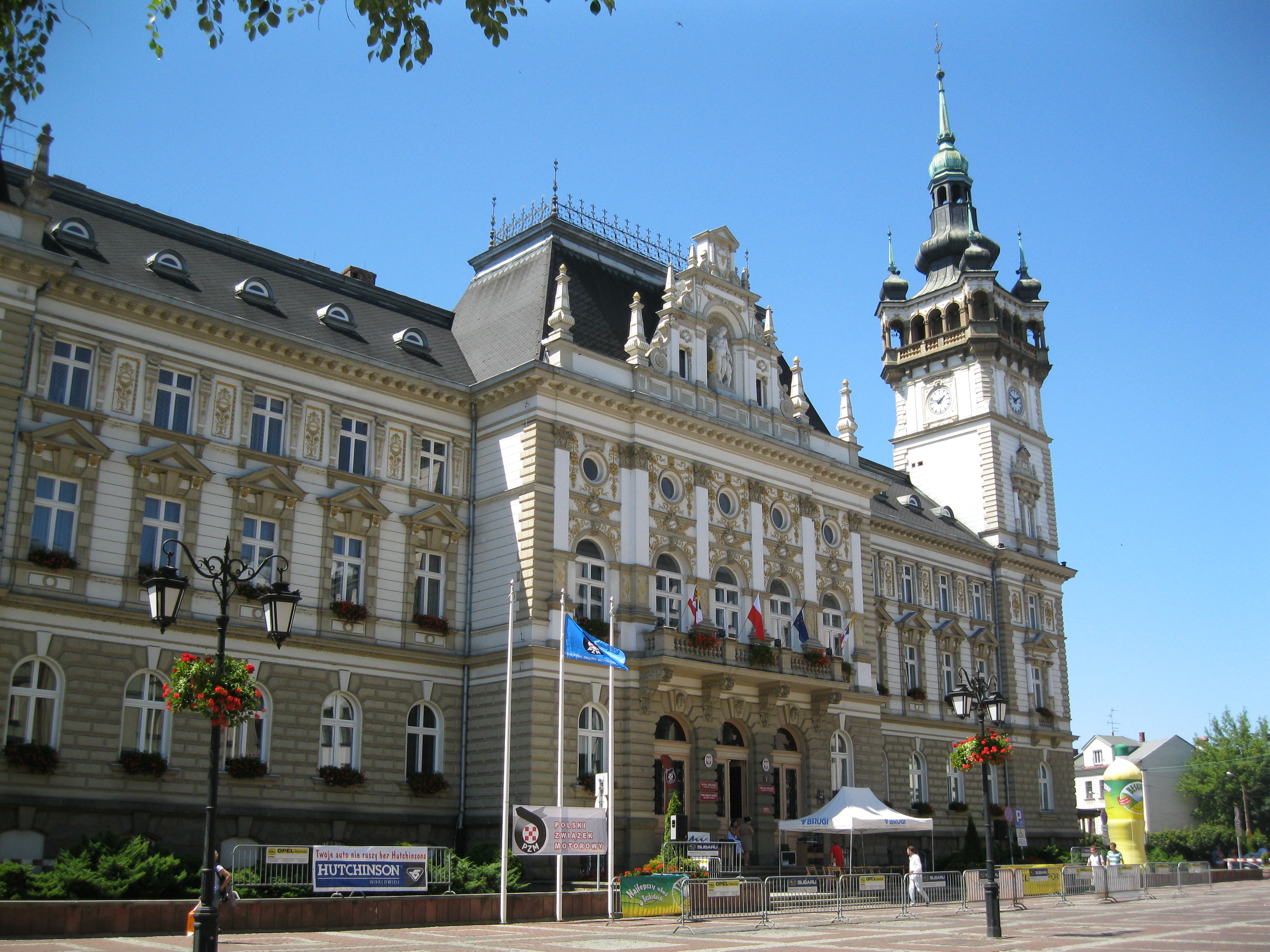
Bielsko-Biała

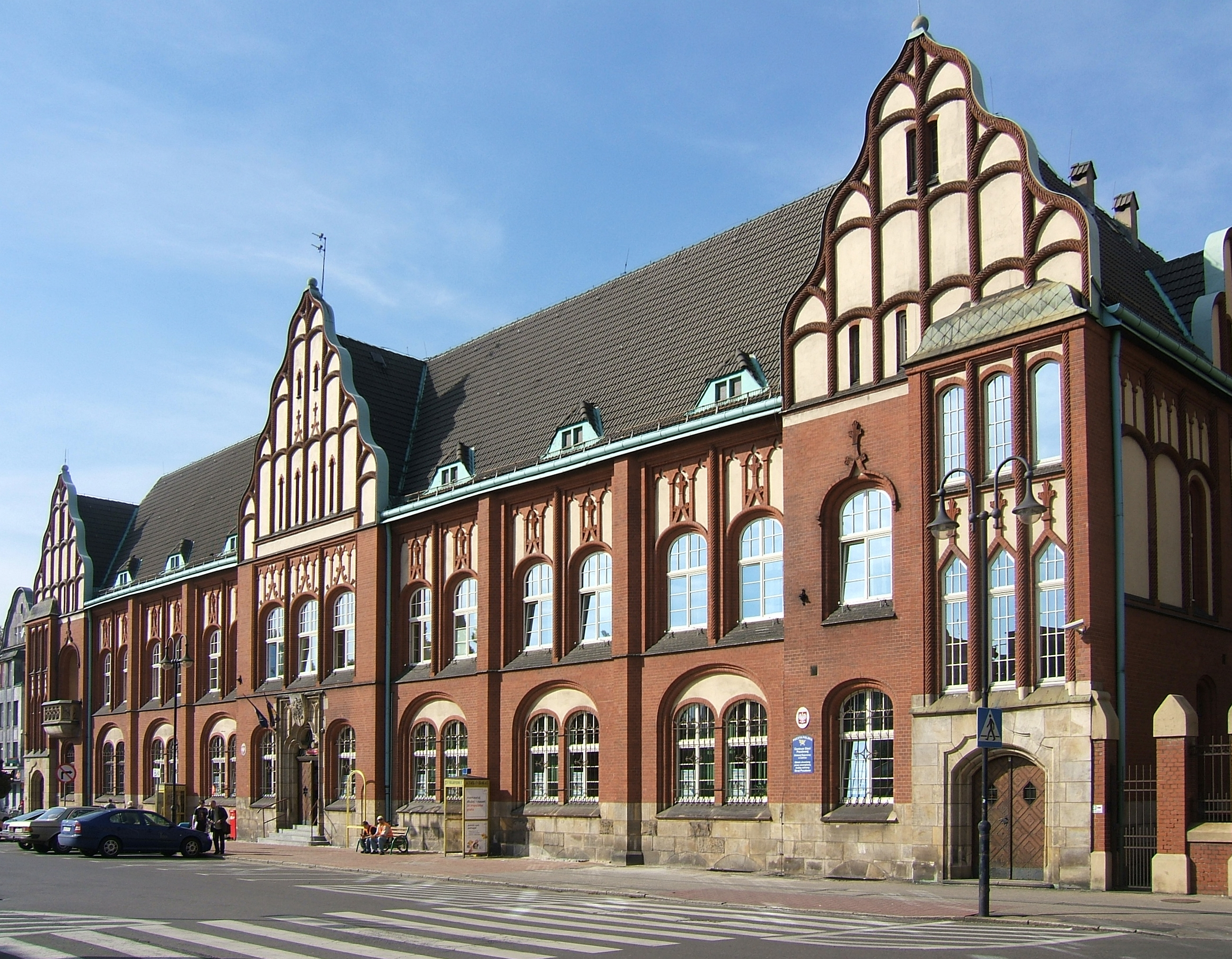
Zabrze

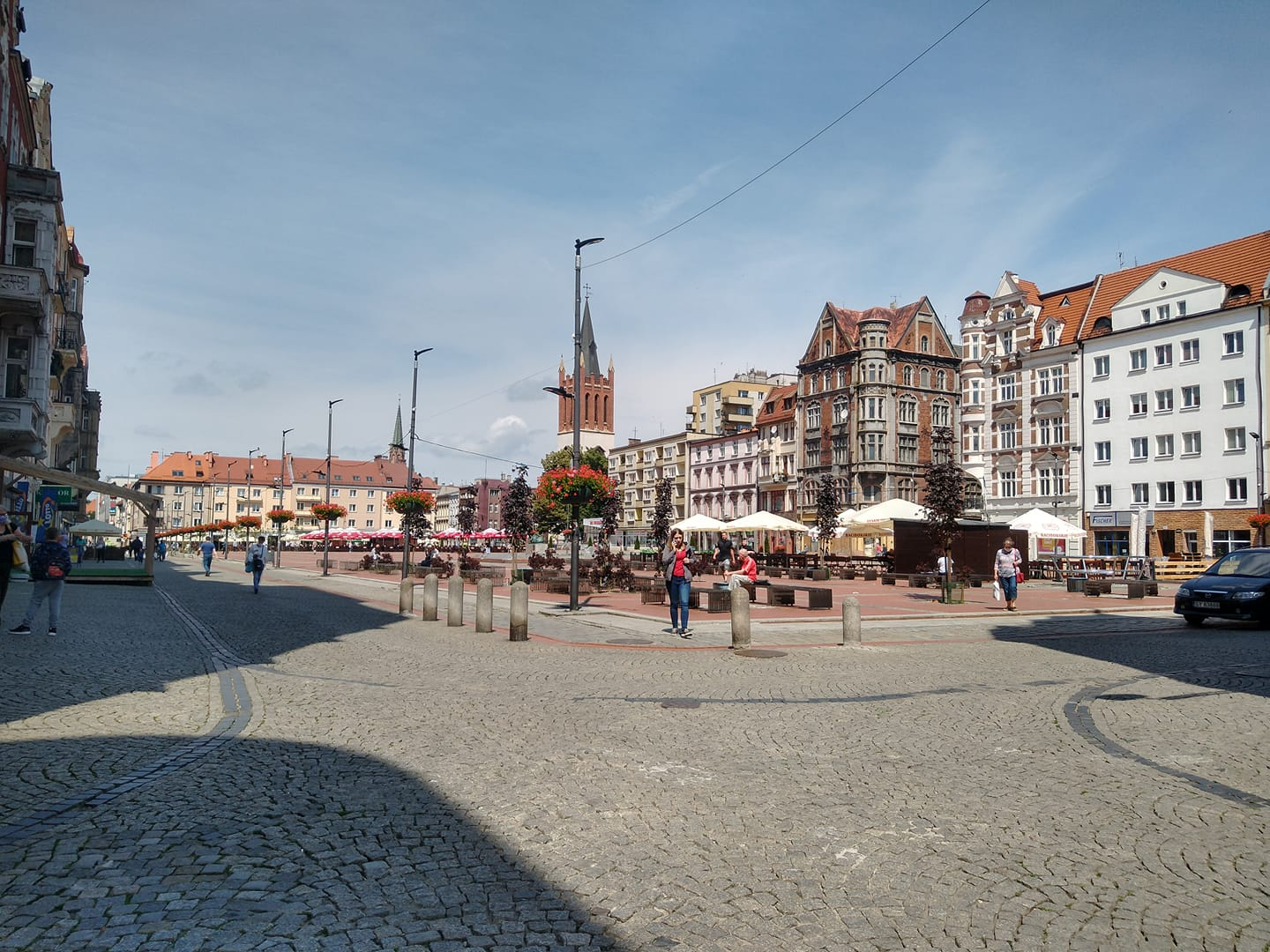
Bytom

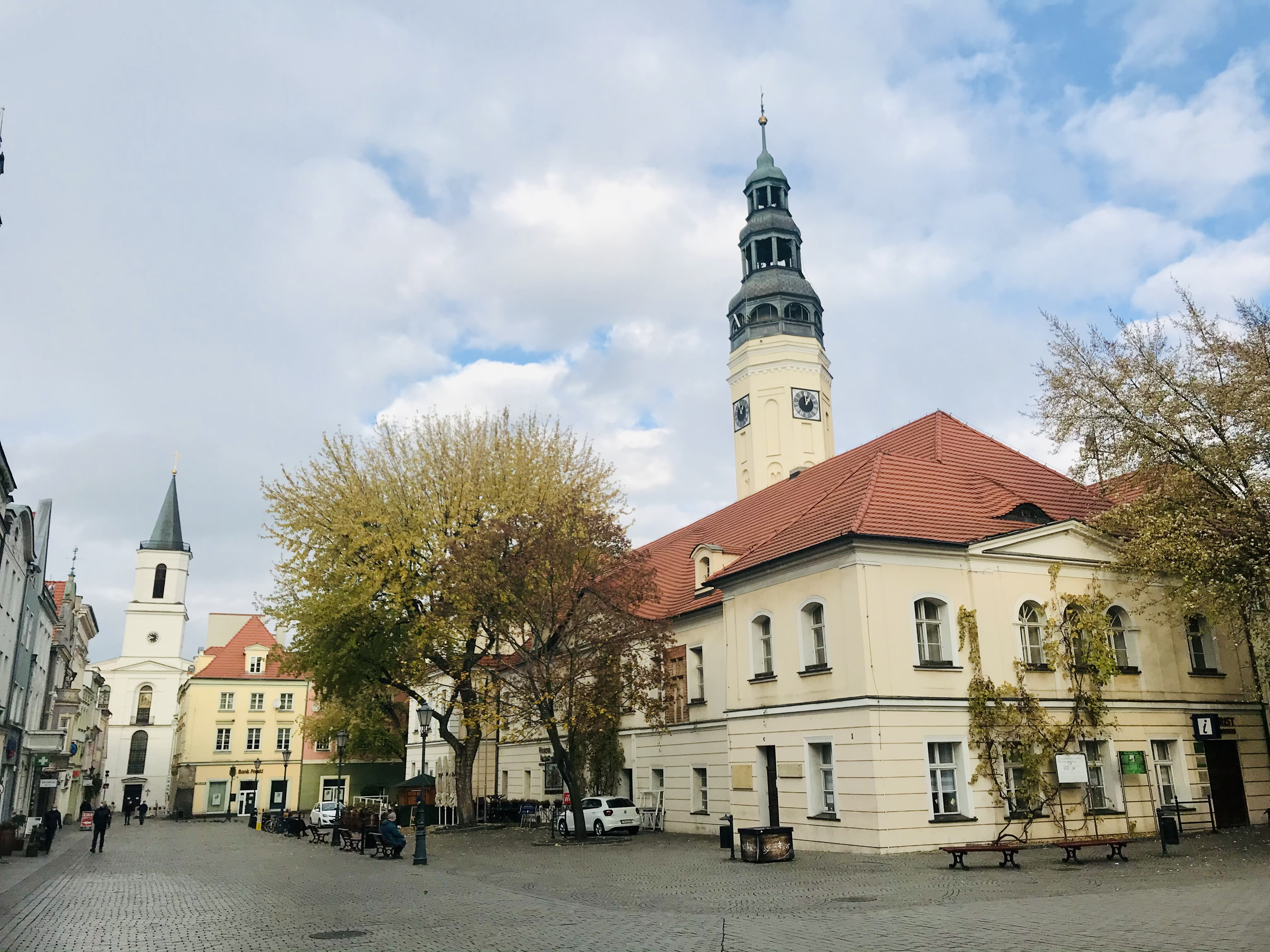
Zielona Góra

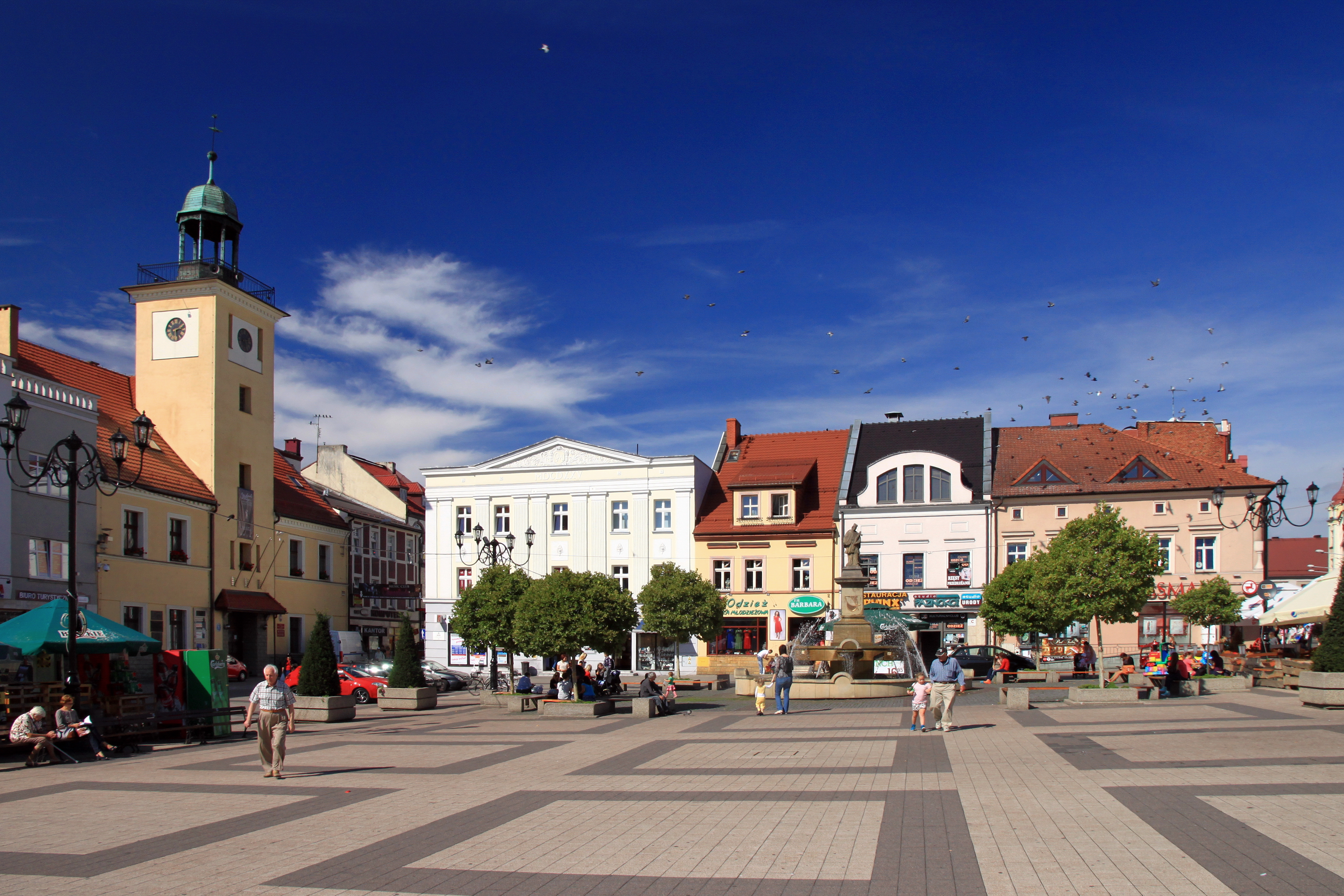
Rybnik

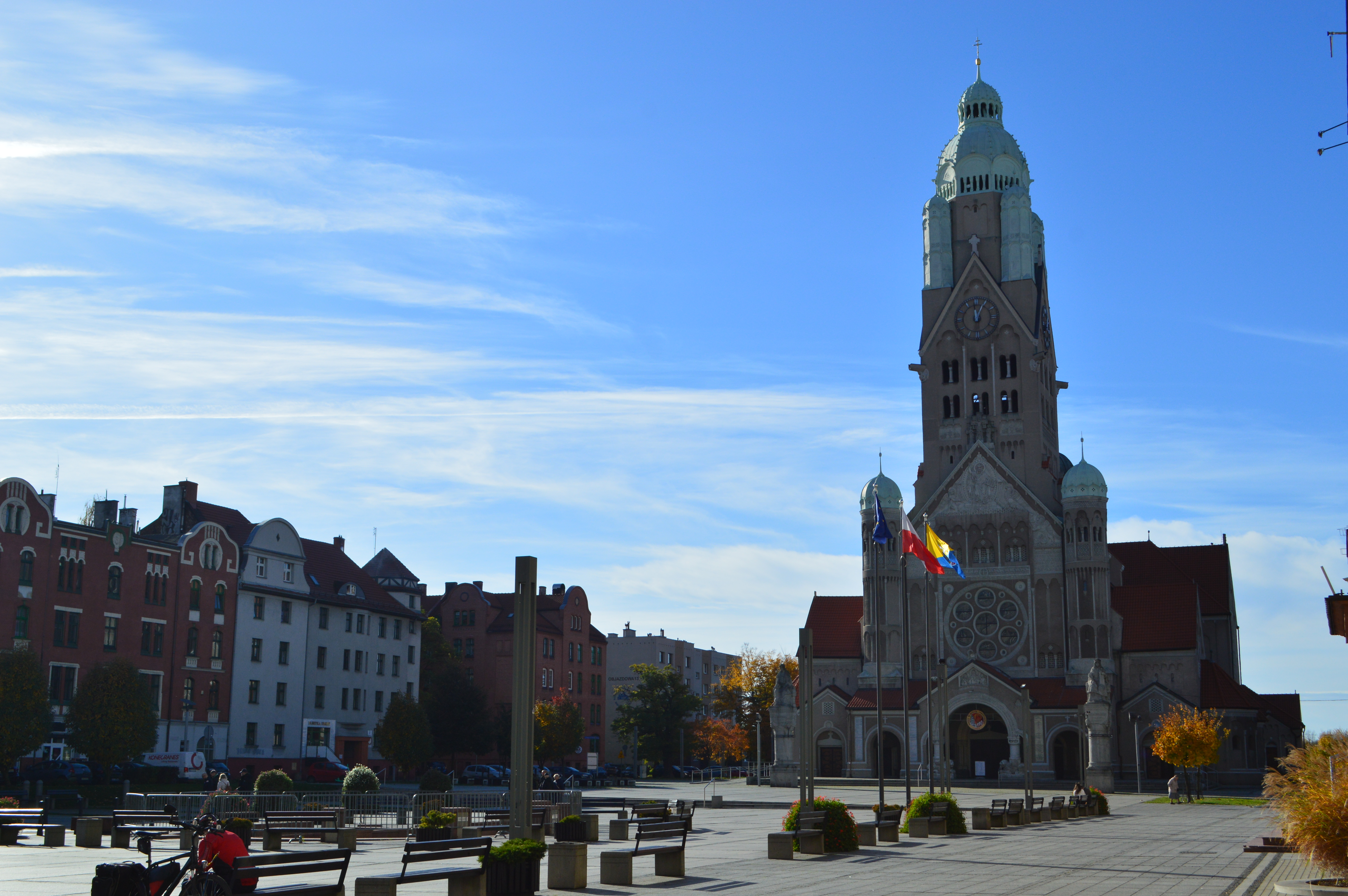
Ruda Śląska

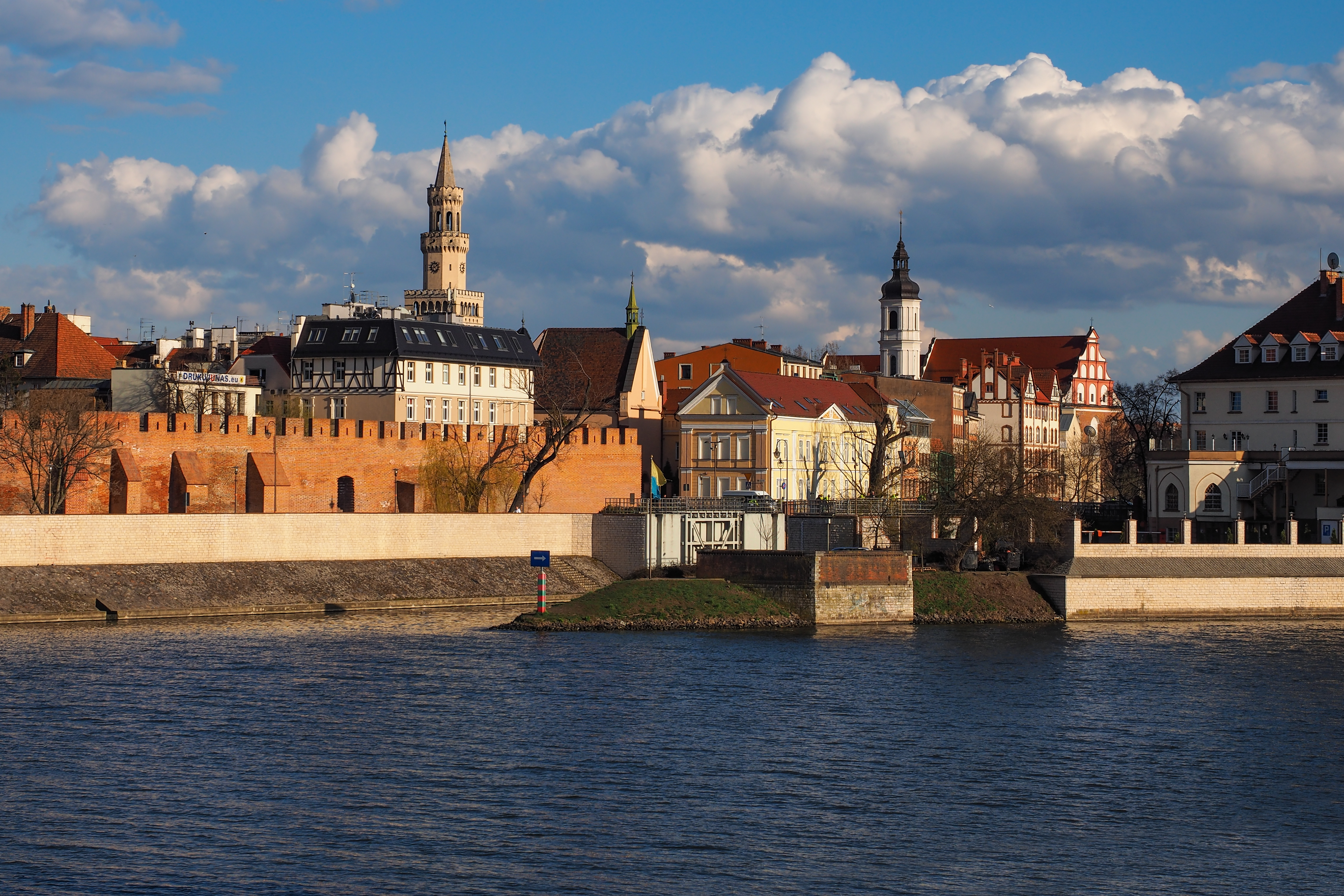
Opole

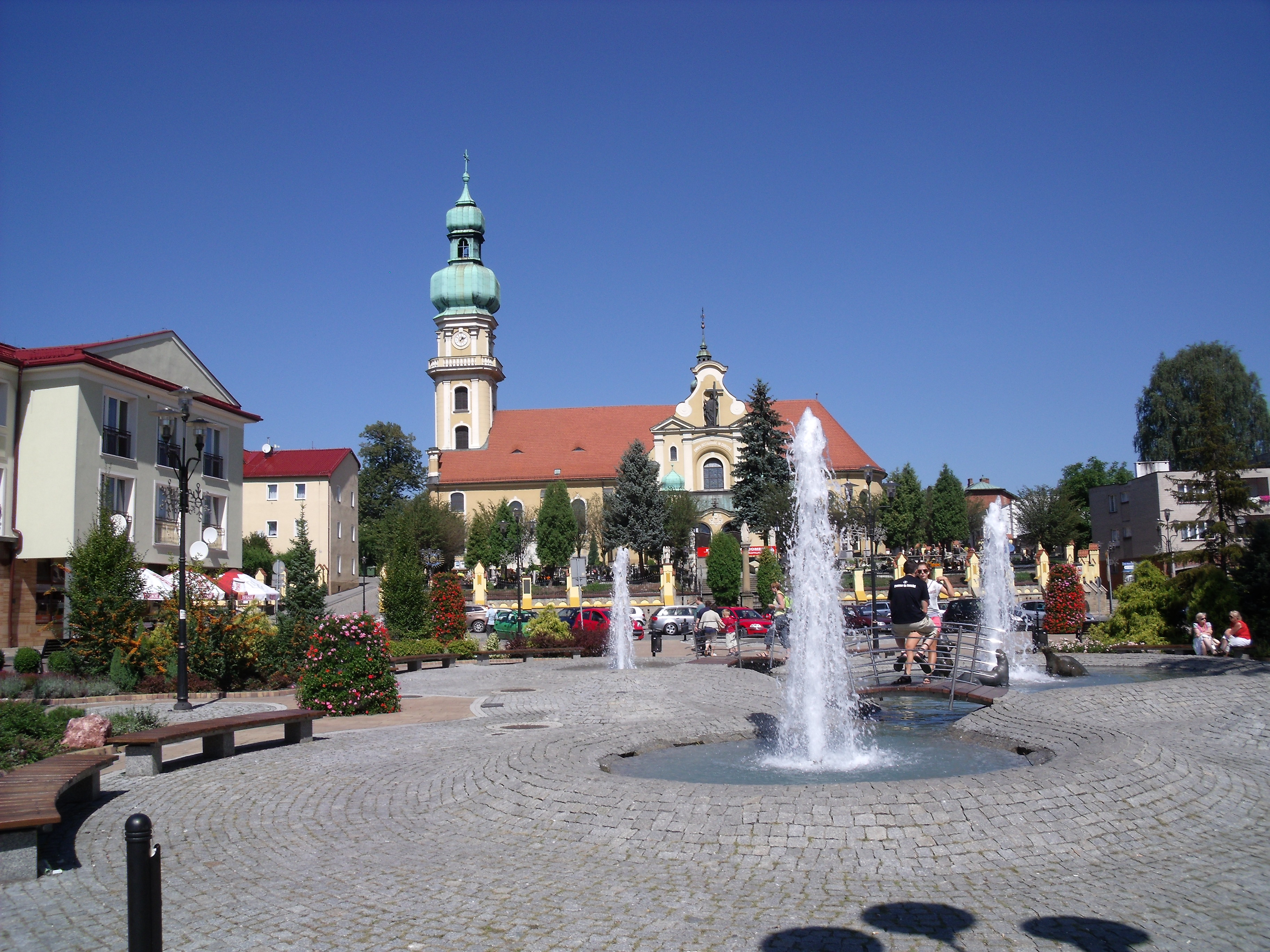
Tychy

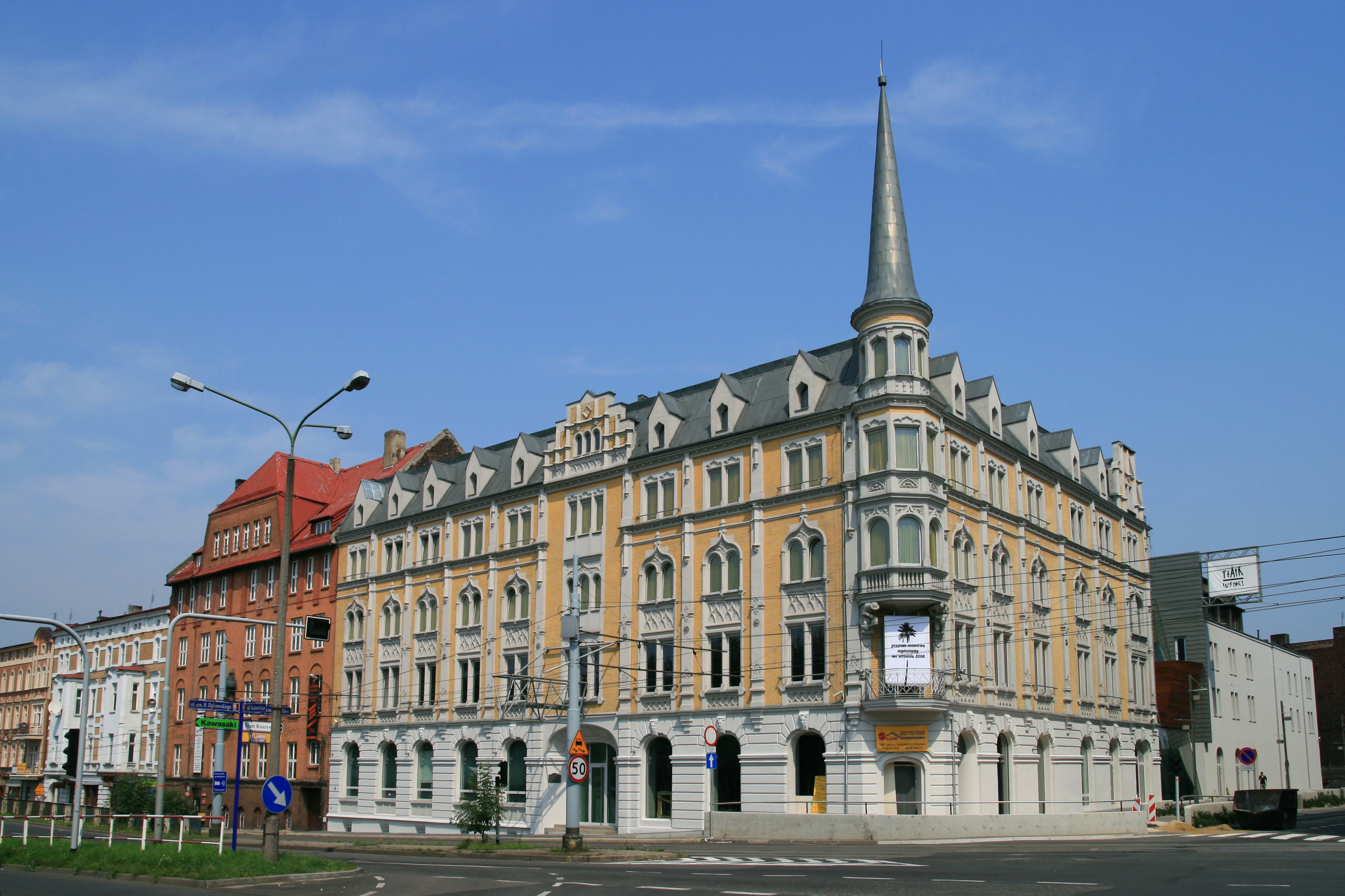
Chorzów

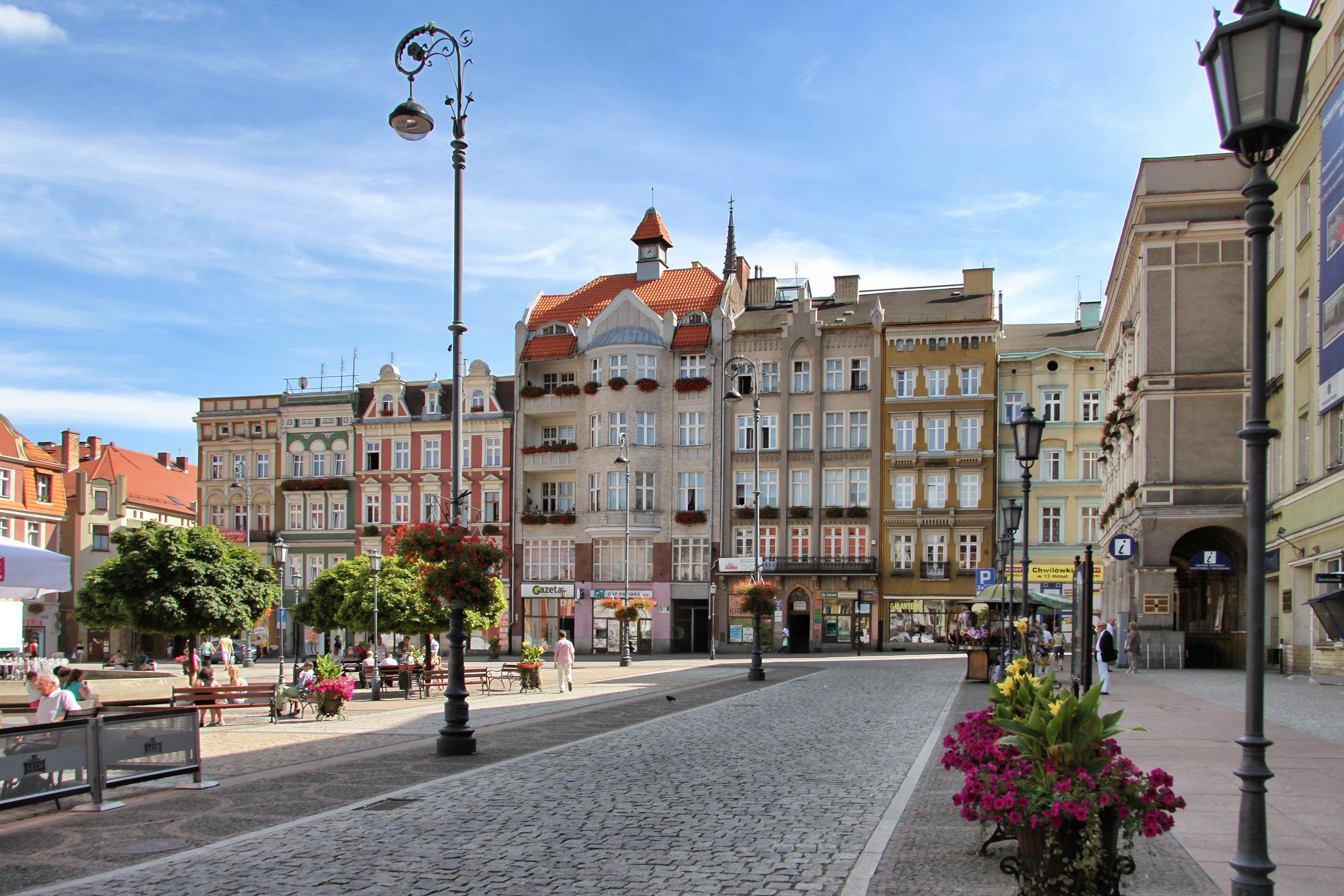
Wałbrzych

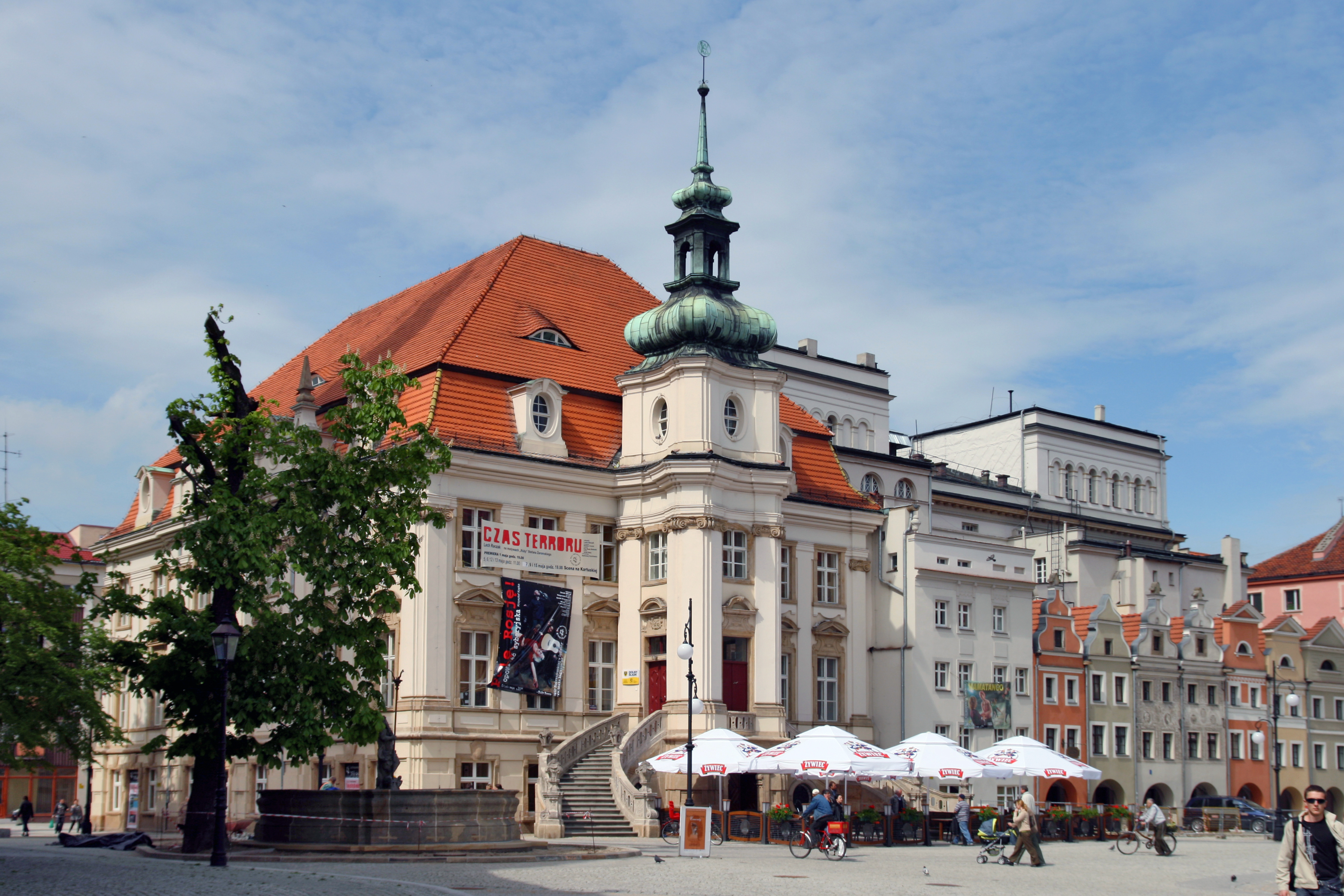
Legnica

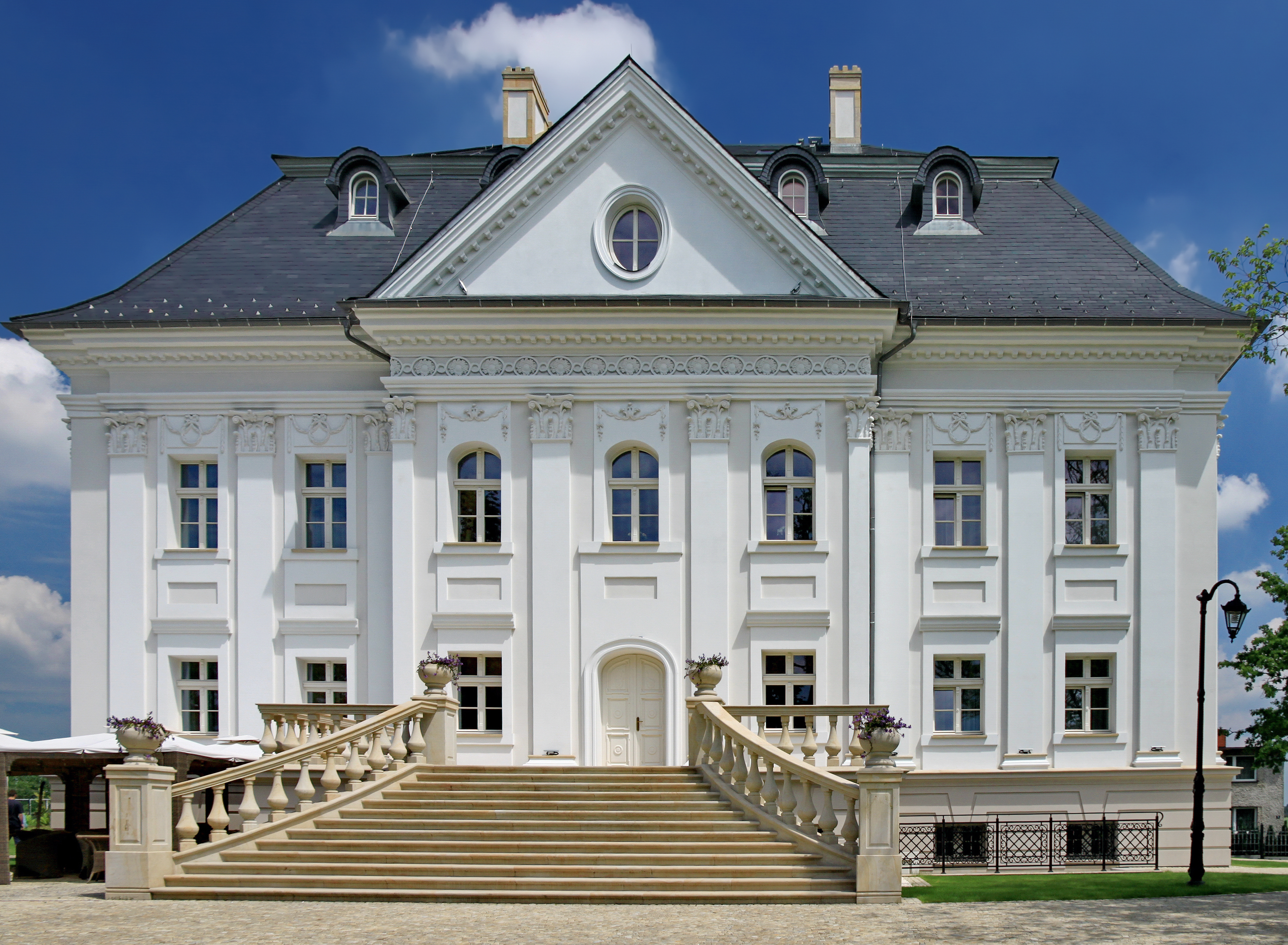
Jastrzębie-Zdrój

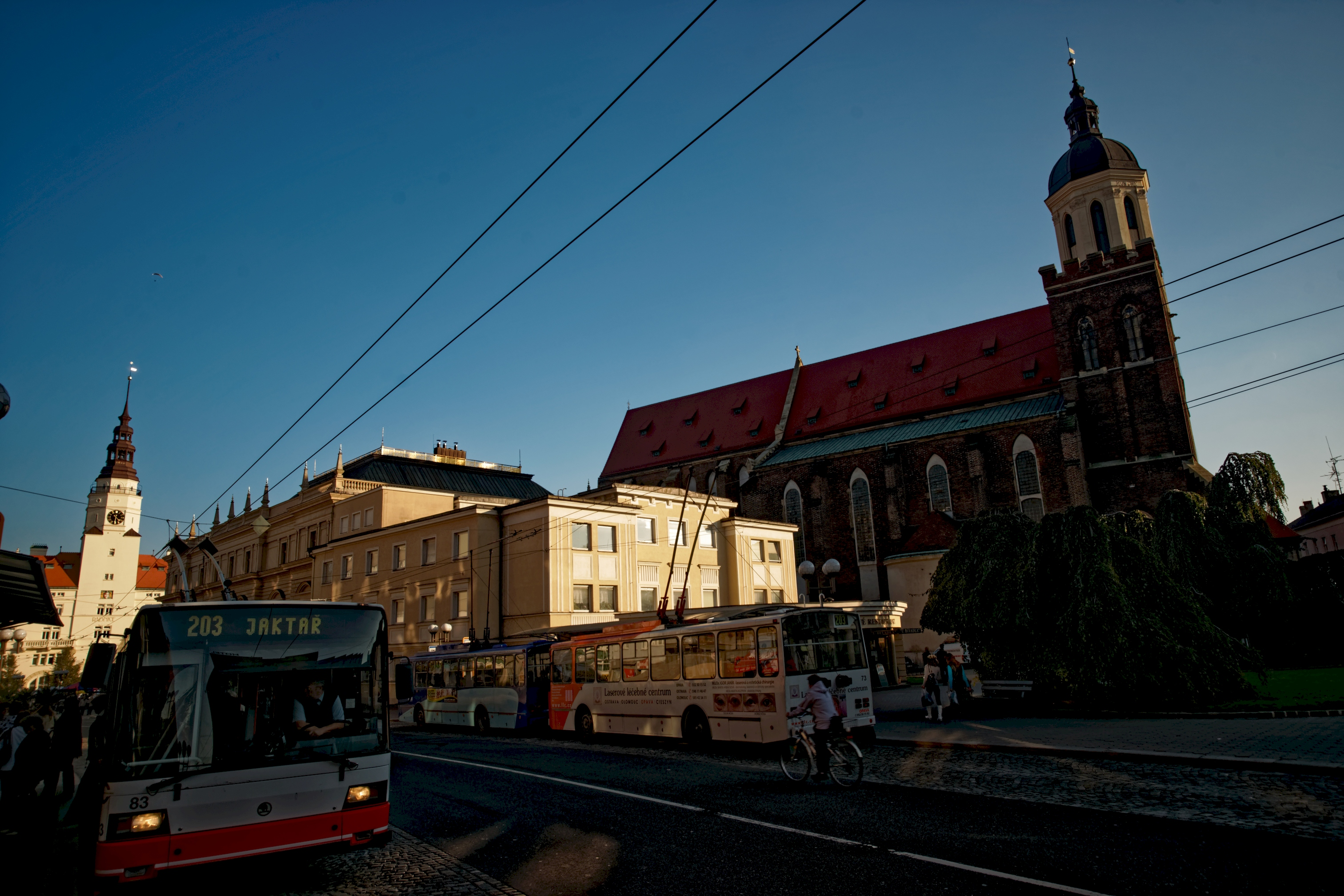
Opava

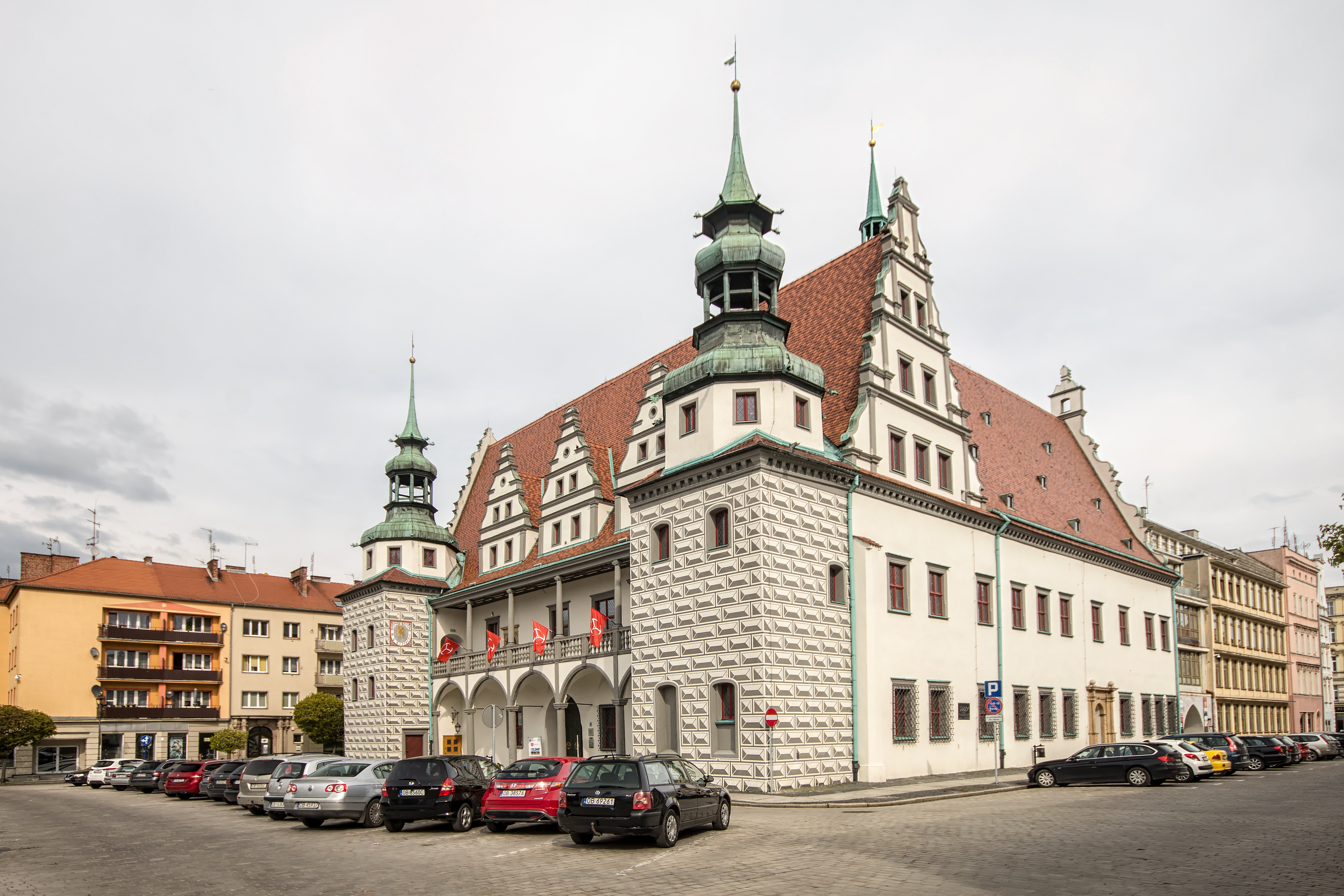
Brzeg

== Flags and coats of arms ==
The emblems of Lower Silesia and Upper Silesia originate from the emblems of the Piasts of Lower Silesia and Upper Silesia. The coat of arms of Upper Silesia depicts the golden eagle on the blue shield. The coat of arms of Lower Silesia depicts a black eagle on a golden (yellow) shield.

Coat of arms of the Prussian province of Upper Silesia (1919–1938 and 1941–1945)

Coat of arms of the Silesian Voivodeship

The coat of arms of the Opolskie Voivodeship

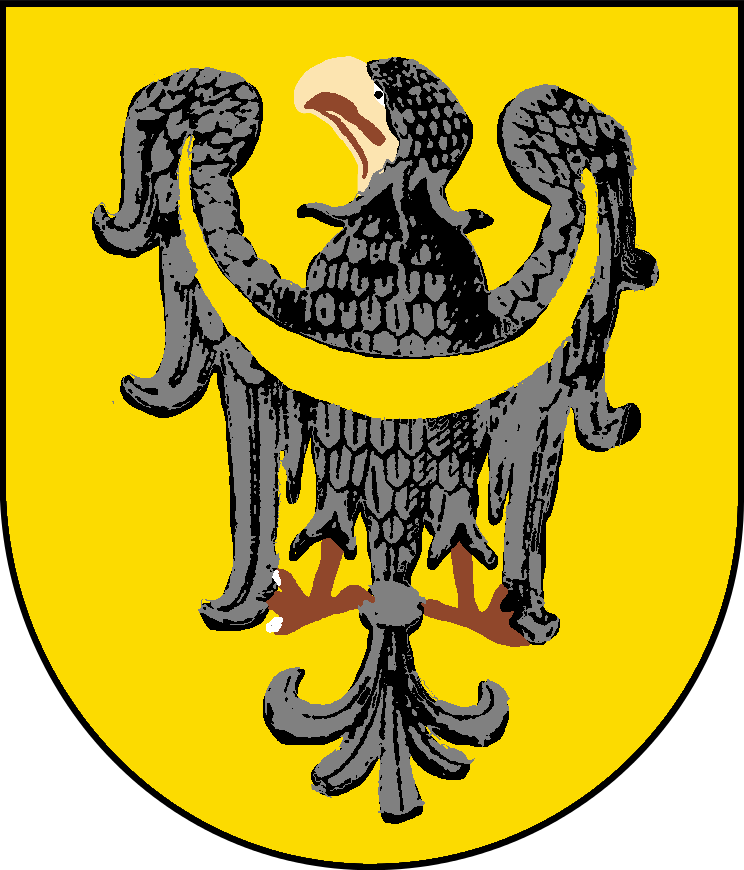
Coat of arms of Duke Henry Probus

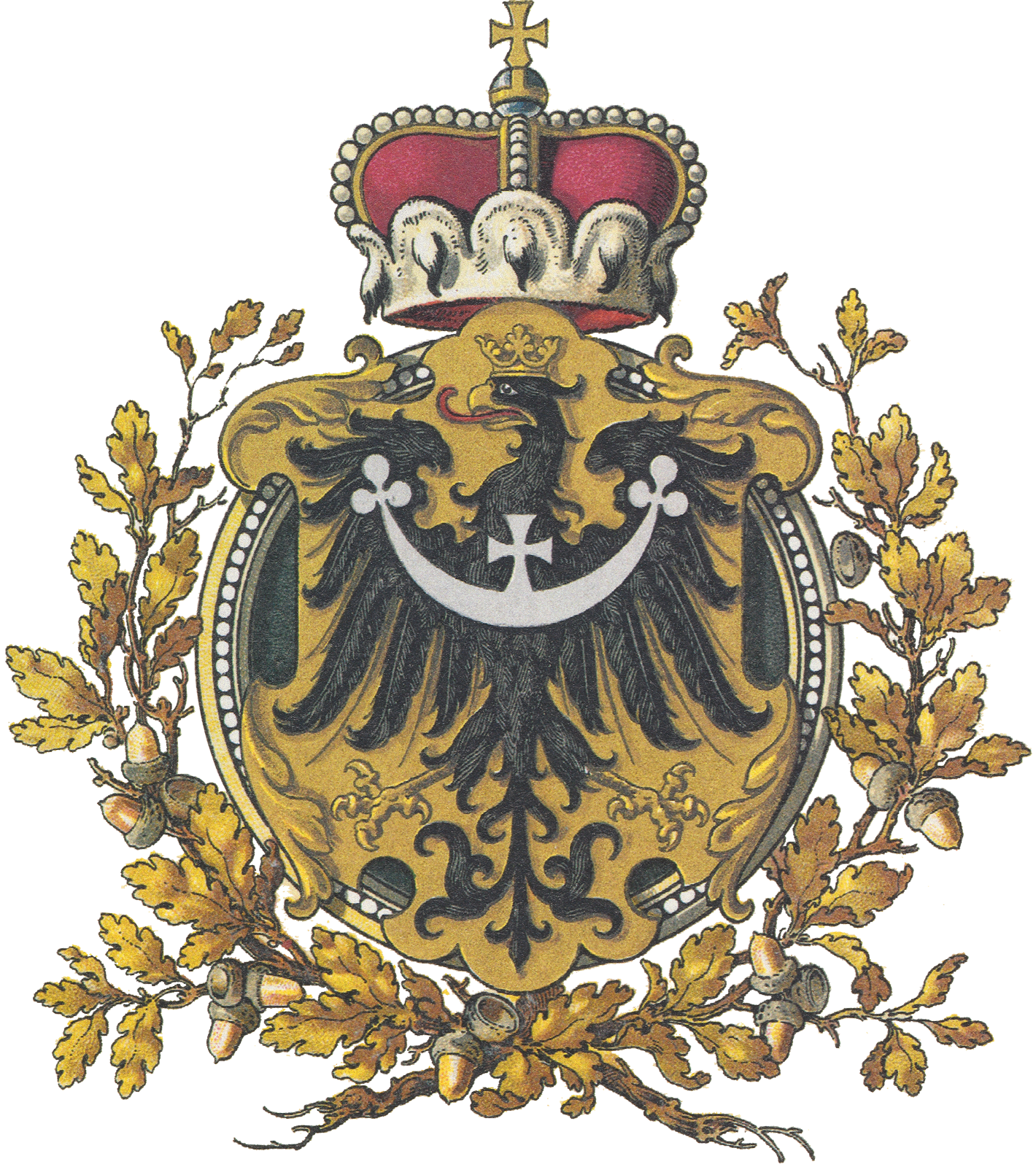
Coat of arms of Austrian Silesia (1742–1918)

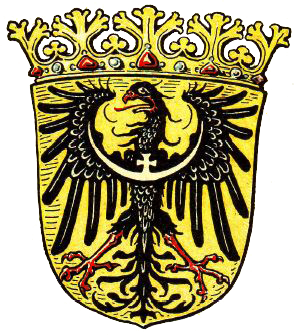
Prussian province of Lower Silesia (1919–1938 and 1941–1945)

Coat of arms of the Lower Silesia Voivodeship

Coat of arms of Czech Silesia

Flags with their colors refer to the coat of arms of Silesia.

Flag of Prussian Upper Silesia province (1919–1938 and 1941–1945)

Flag of Silesia Voivodeship

Flag of the Austrian Silesia (1742–1918), and Czech Silesia

Flag of Prussian Lower Silesia province (1919–1938 and 1941–1945)

Flag of Lower Silesia Voivodeship

== World Heritage Sites ==
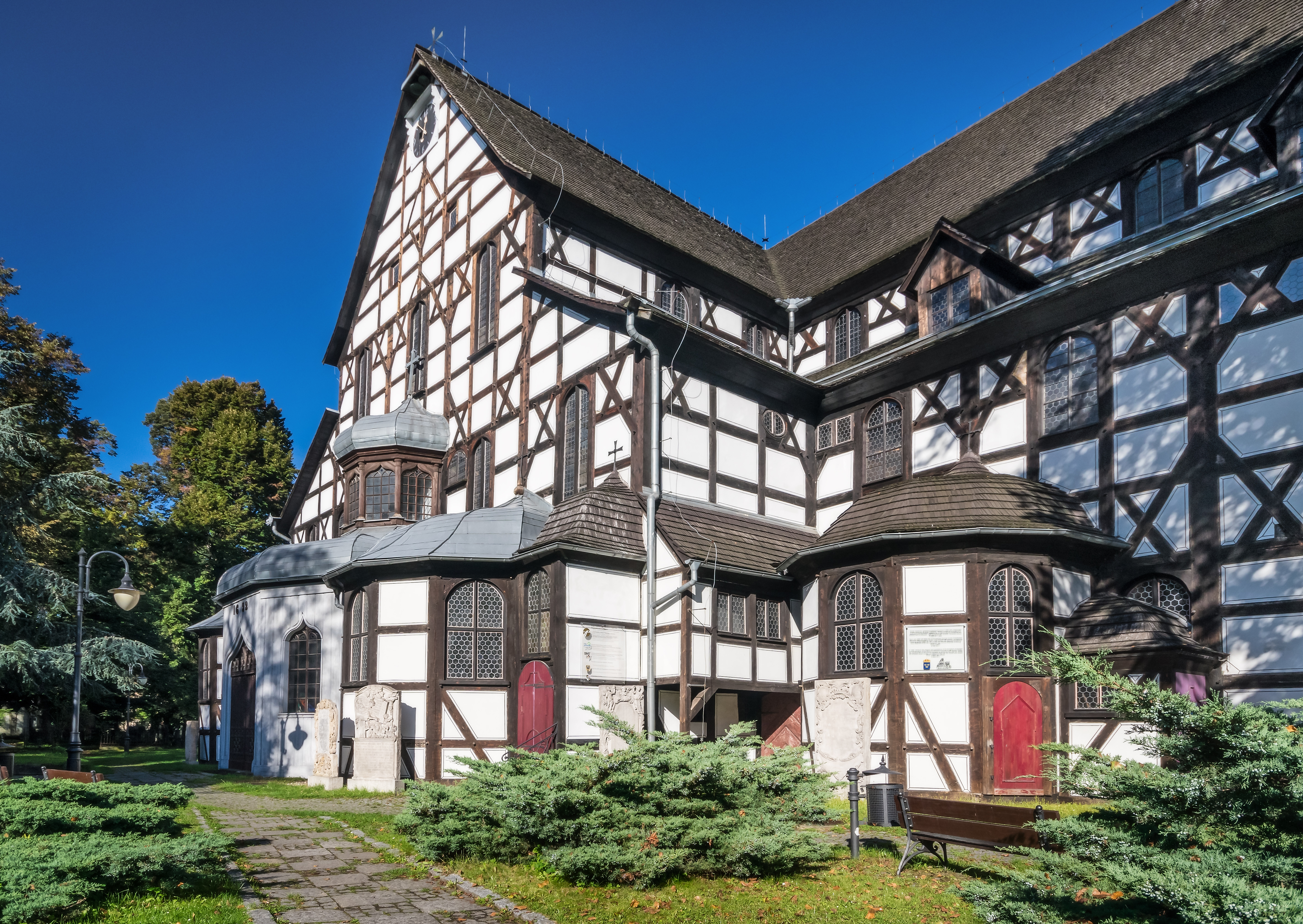
Churches of Peace, Świdnica and Jawor

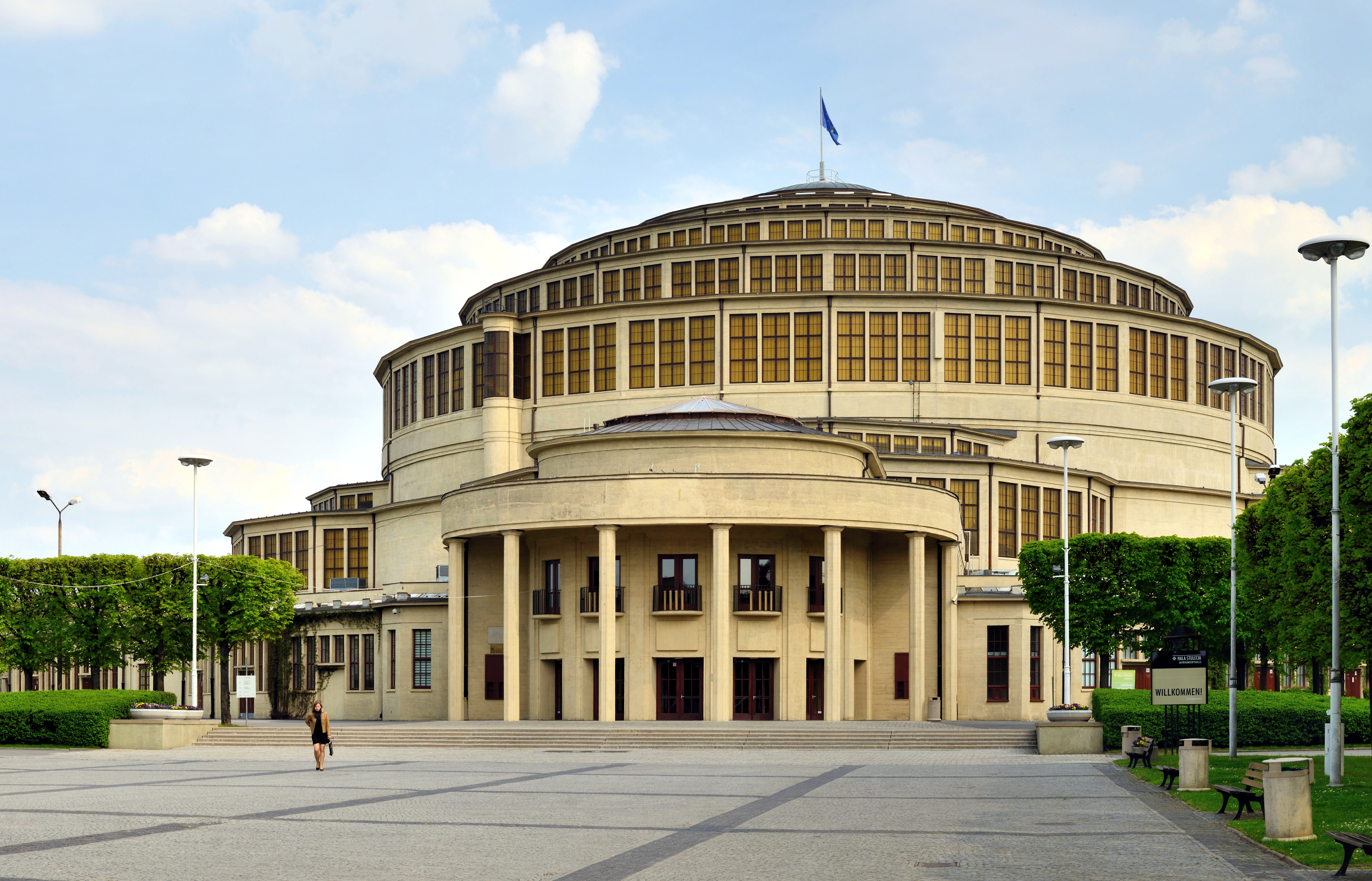
Centennial Hall, Wrocław

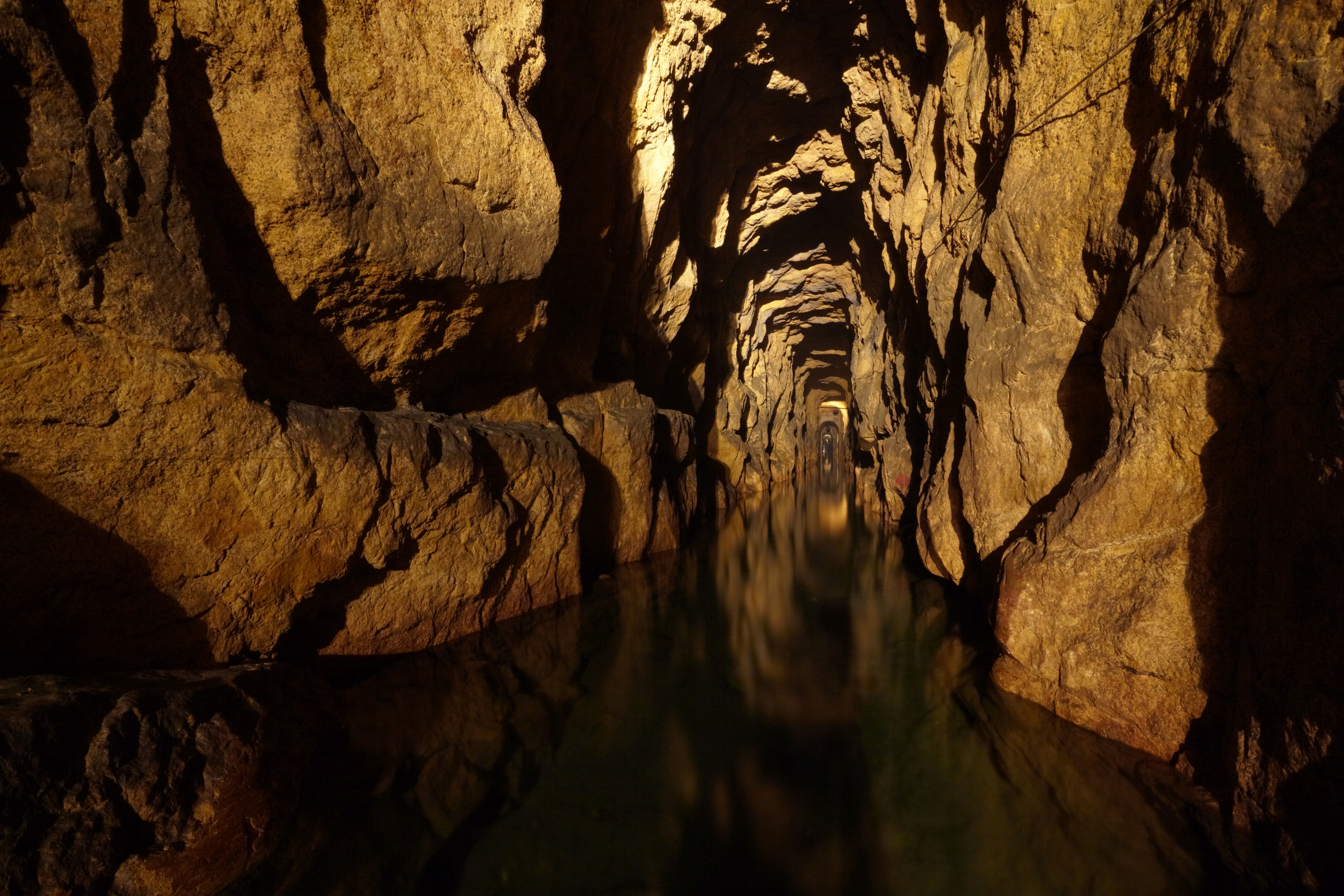
Historic Silver Mine, Tarnowskie Góry

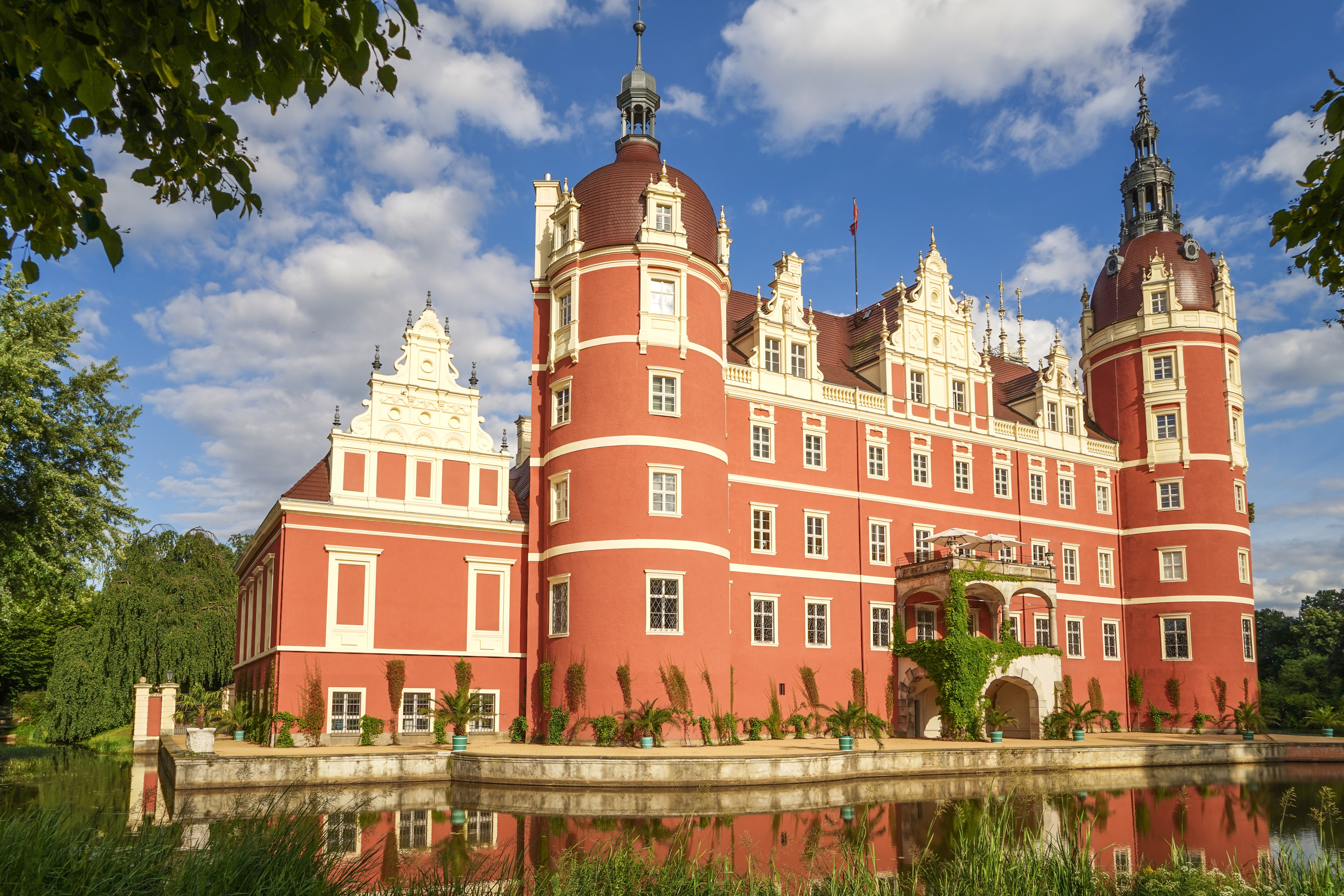
Muskau Park, Łęknica and Bad Muskau

== See also ==
- 257 Silesia
- Expulsion of Poles by Germany
- Flight and expulsion of Germans (1944–1950)
- List of people from Silesia
- Schlesische Zeitung
- Silesian German
- Silesian Interurbans
- Slezak
- Upper Silesian Industrial Region
- Katowice urban area
- Katowice-Ostrava metropolitan area
- Territorial losses of Germany in the 20th century

== Sources ==
- Chisholm, Hugh, ed. (1911). "Silesia" . Encyclopædia Britannica. Vol. 25 (11th ed.). Cambridge University Press. pp. 90–92.
- Czapliński, Marek; Wiszewski, Przemysław, eds. (2014). "Cuius regio? Ideological and Territorial Cohesion of the Historical Region of Silesia" (PDF). Region Divided - Times of Nation-States (1918-1945). Vol. 4. Wrocław, Poland: ebooki.com.pl. ISBN 978-83-927132-8-9.
- Długajczyk, Edward (1993). Tajny front na granicy cieszyńskiej. Wywiad i dywersja w latach 1919–1939. Katowice: Śląsk. ISBN 83-85831-03-7.
- Harc, Lucyna; Wąs, Gabriela, eds. (2014). "Cuius regio? Ideological and Territorial Cohesion of the Historical Region of Silesia" (PDF). The Strengthening of Silesian Regionalism (1526-1740). Vol. 2. Wrocław, Poland: ebooki.com.pl. ISBN 978-83-927132-6-5.
- Harc, Lucyna; Kulak, Teresa, eds. (2015). "Cuius regio? Ideological and Territorial Cohesion of the Historical Region of Silesia" (PDF). Silesia under the Authority of the Hohenzollerns (1741-1918). Vol. 3. Wrocław, Poland: ebooki.com.pl. ISBN 978-83-942651-3-7.
- Plater, Stanisław (1825). Jeografia wschodniéy części Europy czyli Opis krajów przez wielorakie narody słowiańskie zamieszkanych : obejmujący Prussy, Xsięztwo Poznańskie, Szląsk Pruski, Gallicyą, Rzeczpospolitę Krakowską, Krolestwo Polskie i Litwę [Geography of the Eastern Part of Europe, or Description of the Countries inhabited by Various Slavic Nations: Including Prussia, the Duchy of Posen, Prussian Silesia, Galicia, the Republic of Cracow, the Kingdom of Poland, and Lithuania] (in Polish). Wrocław: Wilhelm Bogumił Korn.
- Przemysław, Wiszewski, ed. (2013). "Cuius regio? Ideological and Territorial Cohesion of the Historical Region of Silesia" (PDF). The Long Formation of the Region (c. 1000–1526). Vol. 1. Wrocław, Poland: ebooki.com.pl. ISBN 978-83-927132-1-0.
- Wiszewski, Przemysław, ed. (2015). "Cuius regio? Ideological and Territorial Cohesion of the Historical Region of Silesia" (PDF). Permanent Change - The New Region(s) of Silesia (1945-2015). Vol. 5. Wrocław, Poland: ebooki.com.pl. ISBN 978-83-942651-2-0.
- Zahradnik, Stanisław; Marek Ryczkowski (1992). Korzenie Zaolzia. Warszawa - Praga - Trzyniec: PAI-press. OCLC 177389723.
