= Flag of Opole Voivodeship =

Flag of the Opole Voivodeship, Poland

Opole Voivodeship
- Use: civil flag
- Proportion: 5:8
- Adopted: 21 December 2004
- Design: two horizontal stripes, with yellow on the top, and blue at the bottom, of which, the top stripe is twice the size of the bottom one
- Designed by: Michał Marciniak-Kożuchowski
- Use: state flag
- Proportion: 5:8
- Adopted: 21 December 2004
- Design: two horizontal stripes, with yellow on the top, and blue at the bottom, of which, the top stripe is twice the size of the bottom one, with a coat of arms of the voivodeship placed in the right corner, within the yellow stripe
- Designed by: Michał Marciniak-Kożuchowski

The civil flag of the Opole Voivodeship, Poland is a rectangle divided into two horizontal stripes, with yellow on the top, and blue at the bottom. The top stripe is twice the size of the bottom one.

== Design ==
The civil flag of the Opole Voivodeship is a rectangle, with an aspect ratio of height to width of 5:8, which is divided into two horizontal stripes, with yellow on the top, and blue at the bottom. The top stripe is twice the size of the bottom one.

The state flag of the voivodeship uses the design of the civil flag, with the coat of arms of the voivodeship placed in the right corner, within the yellow stripe. The coat of arms depicts a yellow (golden) eagle on the blue background within the Old French style escutcheon.

== History ==
The flag of the Duchy of Upper and Lower Silesia, used until 1918.

The Duchy of Upper and Lower Silesia, an autonomous region of Kingdom of Bohemia, within Austria-Hungary used a flag horizontally divided into two stripes, which were black on top, and yellow on the bottom. The colours came from the oat of arms of Lower Silesia, which features black eagle on a yellow background. It is unknown where the flag begun being used. The state itself existed from 1742 to 1918.

The flag of the Province of Upper Silesia, used from 1920 to 1935.

The Province of Upper Silesia of the Free State of Prussia adopted its flag in 1920. It was rectangle divided horizontally into two stripes: yellow on top, and dark blue on the bottom. The aspect ratio of its height to its width was equal 2:3. Its colours had been based on the coat of arms of Upper Silesia. It was used until 1935, when Nazi Germany forbid its provinces from flying its flags, ordering them to replace them with the national flag.

The flag proposed by the Union of Upper Silesians in 1920.

On 23 April 1920, the Union of Upper Silesians, an independence movement for Upper Silesia, proposed a design for a flag of the potential Upper Silesian independent state. The flag would be divided horizontally into three stripes, that were, from top to bottom: black, white, and yellow. The movement operated until 1924.

The Opole Voivodeship was established in 1999. Its flag was approved by Opole Regional Assembly on 28 September 2004, and officially adopted on 21 December of the same year. It was designed by Michał Marciniak-Kożuchowski.
