= Flag of Upper Silesia =

Upper Silesia
- Proportion: 2:3
- Design: A horizontal divided into golden and blue
- Proportion: 2:3
- Design: A horizontal divided into golden and blue, with the coat of arms in centre, depicting a golden eagle in blue escutcheon (shield)

The flag of Upper Silesia (Fana Gůrnygo Ślůnska [ˈfa.na gur.ˈnɪgo ˈɕlonska]) serves as the symbol of the historical and geographical region of the Upper Silesia in Poland, and as one of the symbols of the Silesian people; it is divided horizontally into two stripes: gold on the top and blue on the bottom. It originated as the flag of the Prussian Province of Upper Silesia adopted in 1920, with its colours based on the coat of arms of Upper Silesia. The flag is also a popular symbol used by the Silesian Autonomy Movement and the Silesian Separatist Movement.

== Design ==
The flag is a rectangle divided horizontally into two stripes: gold on the top and blue on the bottom. The aspect ratio of its height to its width is 2:3. The version depicting the coat of arms of Upper Silesia in centre is also used. Such coat of arms depicts a gold eagle in blue escutcheon (shield).

== History ==
The flag of the Duchy of Upper and Lower Silesia, used until 1918.

The Duchy of Upper and Lower Silesia, an autonomous region of Kingdom of Bohemia, within Austria-Hungary used a flag horizontally divided into two stripes, which were black on top, and yellow on the bottom. The colours came from the coat of arms of Lower Silesia, which features a black eagle on a yellow background. It is unknown when the flag begun being used. The duchy itself existed from 1742 to 1918.

The flag of the Province of Upper Silesia, used from 1920 to 1935.

The Province of Upper Silesia adopted its flag in 1920. It was a rectangle divided horizontally into two stripes: yellow on top, and dark blue on the bottom. The aspect ratio of its height to its width was 2:3. Its colours had been based on the coat of arms of Upper Silesia. It was used until 1935, when Nazi Germany forbade its provinces from flying its flags, ordering them to replace them with the national flag.

The flag proposed by the Union of Upper Silesians in 1920.

On 23 April 1920, the Union of Upper Silesians, an independence movement for Upper Silesia, proposed a design for a flag of the potential state. The flag would be divided horizontally into three stripes, that were, from top to bottom: black, white, and yellow. The movement operated until 1924.

Currently, the yellow and blue flag is used as one of the symbols of the Silesian people, especially those inhabiting the area of Upper Silesia. The flag is also popular symbol used by the Silesian Autonomy Movement, a movement established in 2001, supporting the autonomy of Silesia within Poland.

Since 2011, on 15 July, Silesian Flag Day is celebrated in the Silesian Voivodeship.

== Derived flags ==
=== Opole Voivodeship ===
On 21 December 2004, the Opole Voivodeship adopted its flag, that was based on the flag of Upper Silesia. The civil flag of the voivodeship is a rectangle, with an aspect ratio of its height to its width eqal 5:8. It is divided into two horizontal stripes, with yellow on the top, and blue at the bottom. The top stripe is twice the size of the bottom one. The state flag of the voivodeship uses the design of the civil flag, with the coat of arms of the voivodeship placed in the right corner, within the yellow stripe. The coat of arms depicts a yellow (golden) eagle on the blue background within the Old French style escutcheon. Both flags were designed by Michał Marciniak-Kożuchowski.

The civil flag of the Opole Voivodeship.

The state flag of the Opole Voivodeship.

=== Silesian Voivodeship ===
On 11 June 2001, the Silesian Voivodeship adopted its civil and state flags, based on yellow and blue colours of the coat of arms of Upper Silesia. The civil flag is a triband rectangle, with an aspect ratio of its height to its width equal 5:8. It is divided into three stripes, that are from top to bottom: blue, yellow, and blue. The blue stripes are twice the size of the yellow middle stripe. Their proportion of the flag is 2/5 each, while the yellow stripe is 1/5. The state flag of the voivodeship is a blue rectangle, with an aspect ratio of its height to its width equal 5:8. In its centre is placed a yellow eagle, adopted from the coat of arms of the voivodeship. Both flags were designed by Barbara Widłak.

The civil flag of the Silesian Voivodeship.

The state flag of the Silesian Voivodeship.

== See also ==
- Flag of Silesia and Lower Silesia
