= Autonomy March =

Annual LGBT event in Cape Town, South Africa

Silesian Autonomy March
- Status: Active
- Genre: Political Demonstration
- Location: Katowice
- Years active: 18–19
- Inaugurated: 2007
- Previous event: 2026
- Next event: 2027
- Organiser: Silesian Autonomy Movement

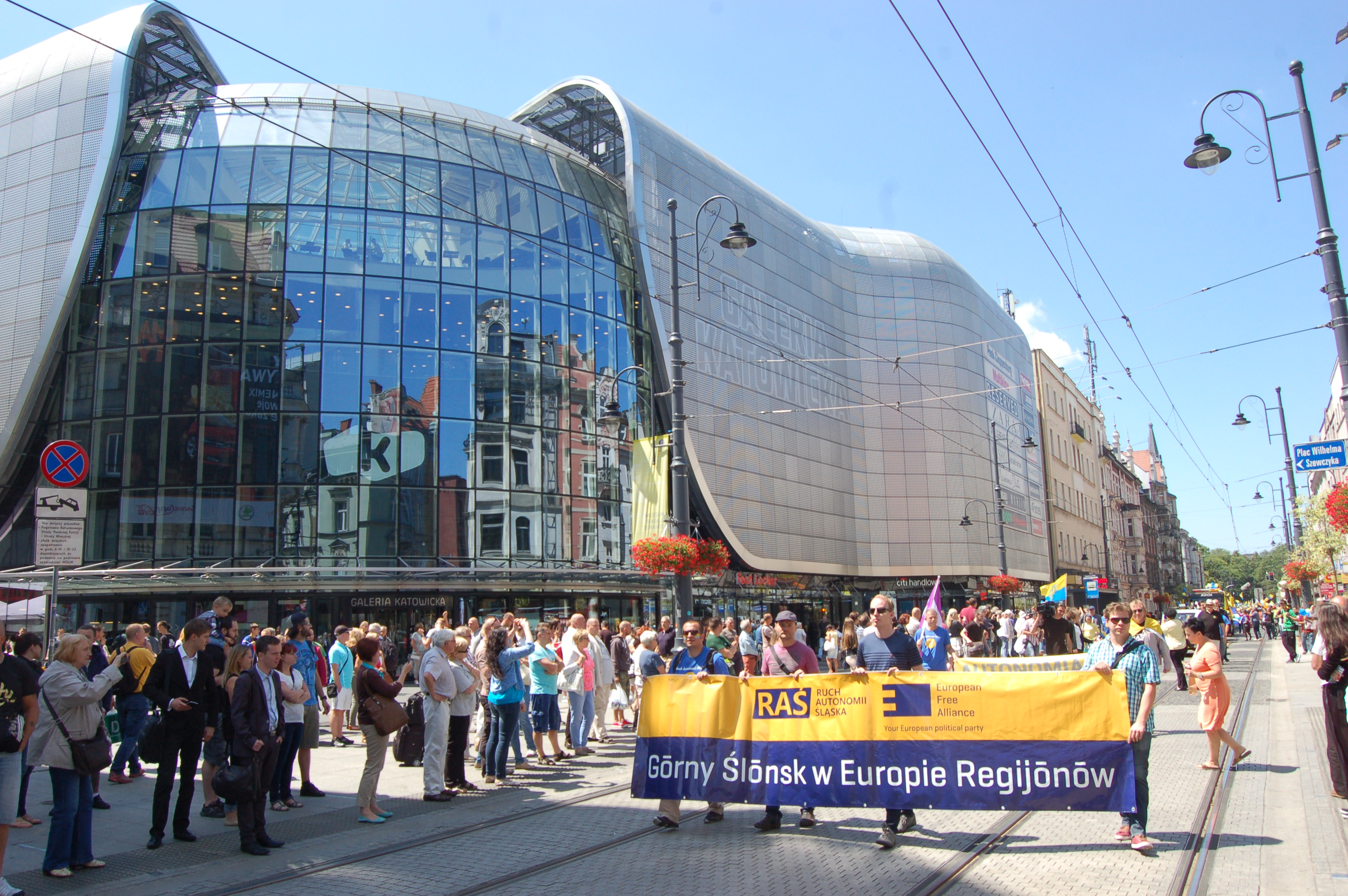
2015 Autonomy March

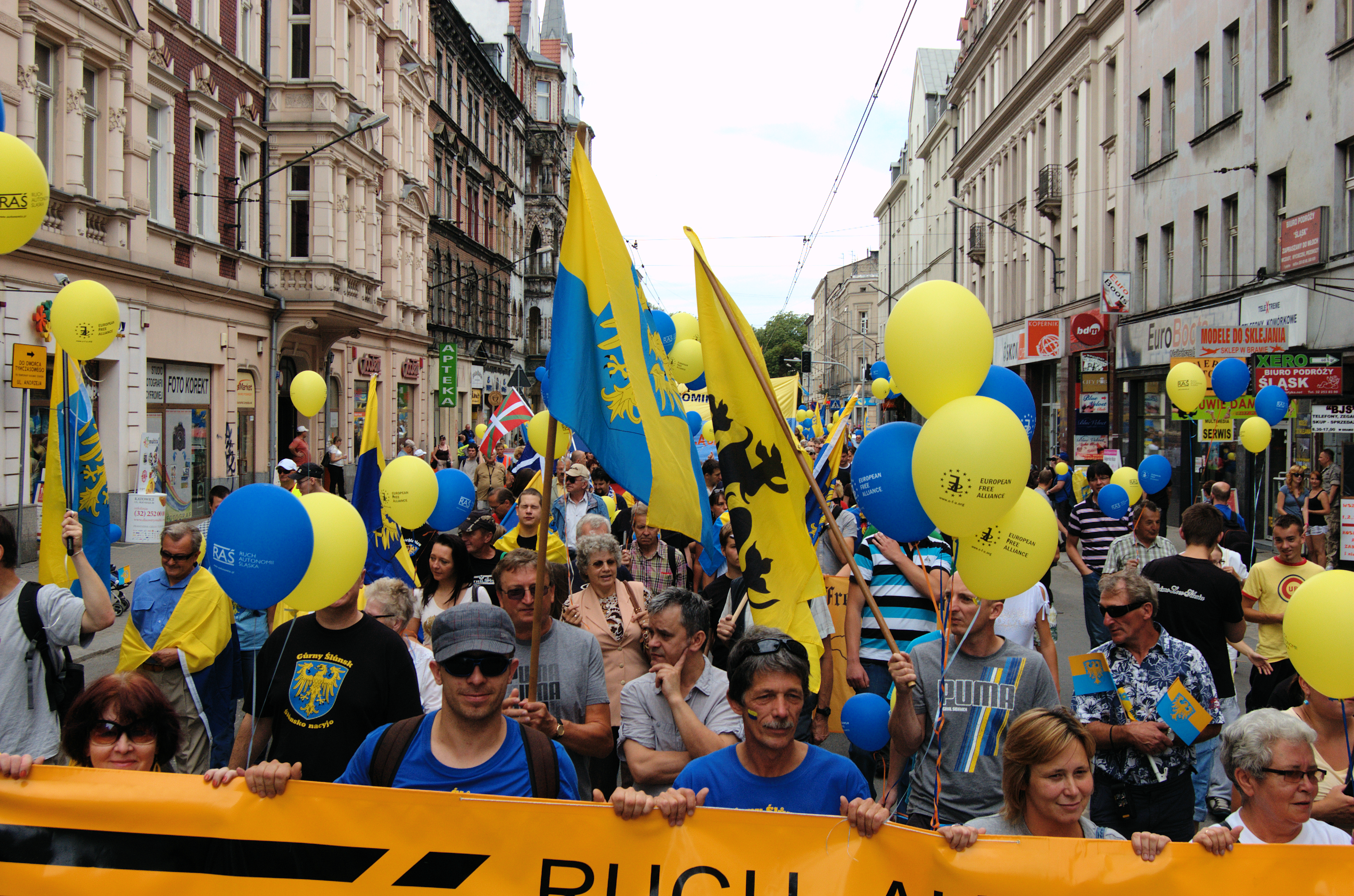
2012 Autonomy March

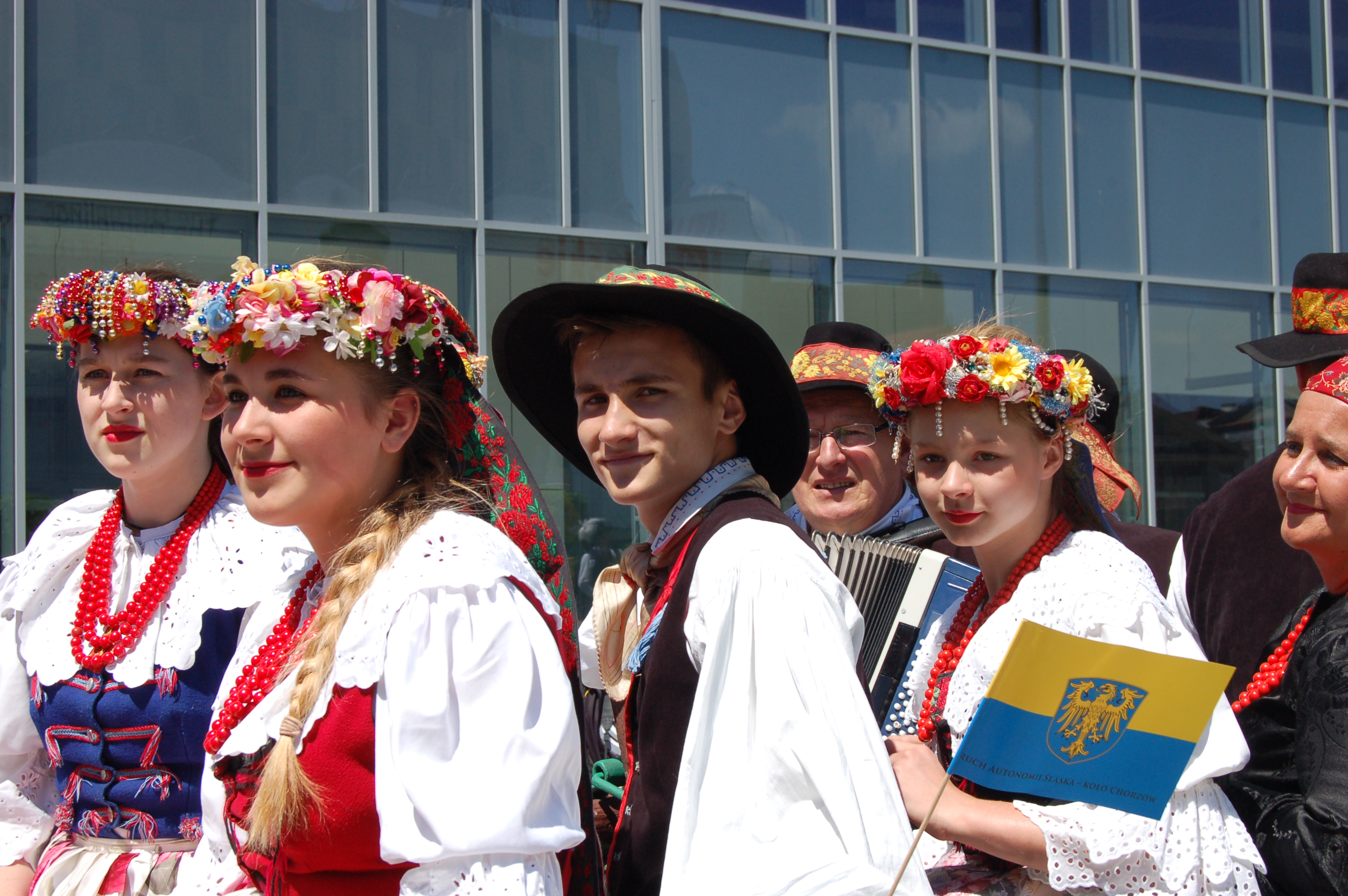
People dressed in Silesian national costumes, 2015

The Autonomy March (Polish: Marsz Autonomii, Silesian: Marsz Autōnōmije) is a demonstration that has taken place annually since 2007 around the 15th of July (the anniversary of adopting the Statute of the Silesian Voivodeship in 1920) in Katowice, Upper Silesia, Poland. It consists of a march through the streets of Katowice in front of the Voivodeship Office (the building of the former Silesian Parliament). According to the organizers, the March is a manifestation of support for the idea to restore autonomy to Upper Silesia in a modern form, modeled on Spanish or German solutions.

The participants of the March carry flags, banners, and symbols in the Upper Silesian gold and blue colors, coats of arms with a golden eagle on a blue background. The Silesian Flag Day (Dzień Ślonskij Fany) is also celebrated on the 15th of July. The main organizer of the March is the Silesian Autonomy Movement. According to the organizers, it is the largest cyclical manifestation of local community issues in Poland.

Several hundred people took part in the first Autonomy march in 2007. The route of the march led from the Market Square to the Voivodship Office. The march ended with a rally, during which postcards were sent to the President of the Republic of Poland, Lech Kaczyński, asking him to restore autonomy. Afterwards, participants had the opportunity to watch films about Upper Silesia at the Upper Silesian Cultural Centre. In 2012, during the VI March, this amount increased to approximately 5000. In 2011 was also celebrated the 1st Upper Silesian Day, aimed at maintaining and nurturing the culture and identity of the region.
