= Coat of arms of the Opole Voivodeship =

Polish coat of arms

- Armiger: Opole Voivodeship
- Adopted: April 2001
- Shield: Blue Old French style escutcheon
- Compartment: Yellow (golden) eagle with raised wings and head turned left, wearing a yellow (golden) crown on its head

The coat of arms, that serves as the symbol of the Opole Voivodeship, Poland, features a yellow (golden) eagle wearing a yellow (golden) crown, placed on a blue background. It was adopted in 2001.

== Design ==
The coat of arms of the Silesian Voivodeship consists of a blue Old French style escutcheon (shield) with square top and pointed base. It features a yellow (golden) eagle with raised wings and head turned left. It wears a yellow (golden) crown on its head. It was based on the historical coat of arms used by Jan II the Good, duke of Silesia.

== History ==
=== Silesian duchies ===
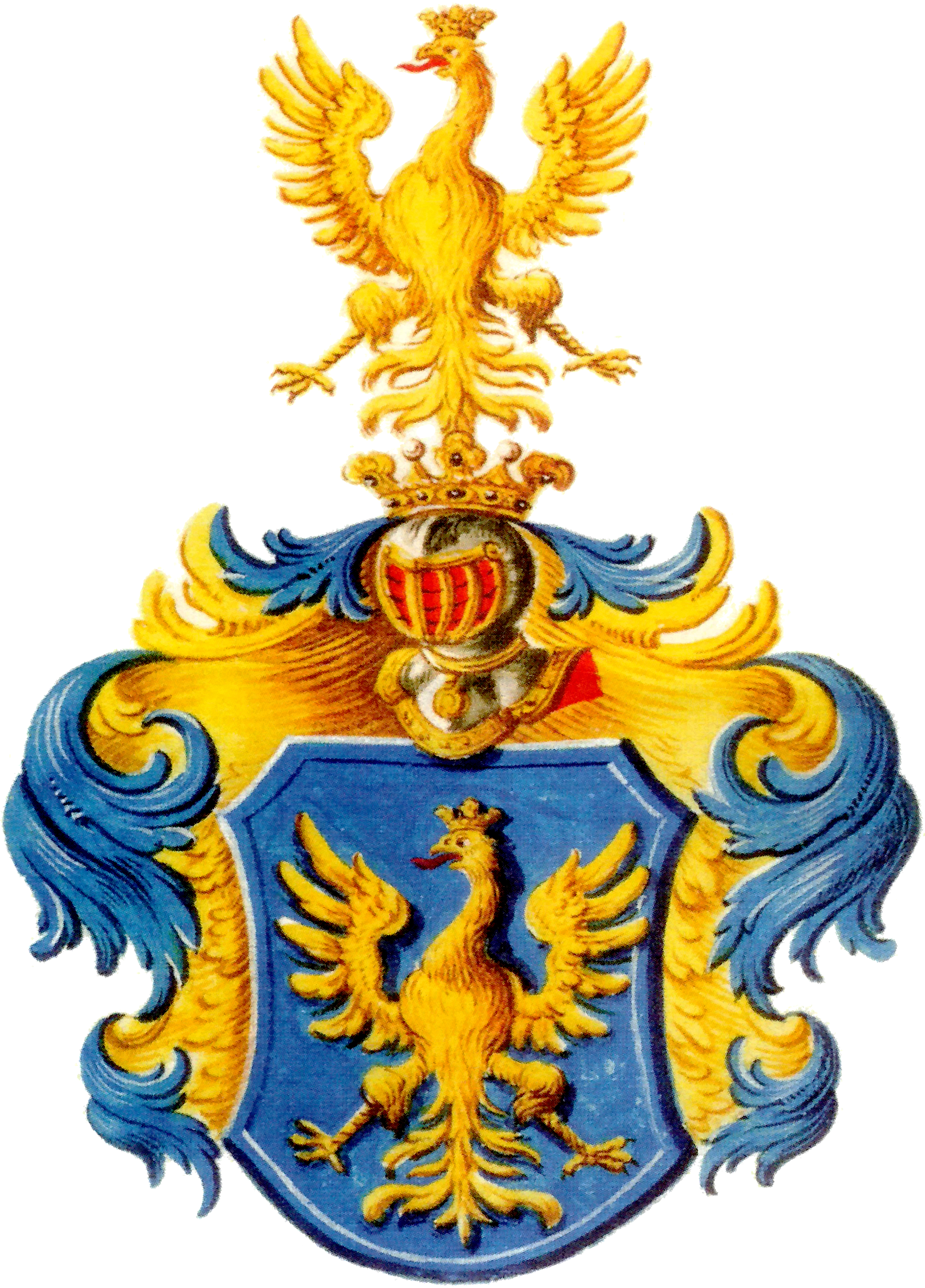
The 18th-century coat of arms of the Duchy of Teschen, under the rule of the Silesian Piast dynasty.

The first coat of arms recorded to be used by a ruler in the area of Upper Silesia, that featured an eagle, belonged to duke Casimir I of Opole, member of the Silesian Piast dynasty, who ruled the Duchy of Opole and Racibórz, from 1211 to 1230. Such design was recorded in a document from 1222, marked with Casimir's seal, that featured him holding a shield with an eagle on it. It remains unknown what colours the coat of arms had. The first known usage of a yellow (golden) eagle in the coat of arms had been recorded in the 1257 and 1260 seals of duke Vladislaus I of Opole, ruler of the Duchy of Opole and Racibórz. Since then, the coat of arms had been used by his descendants.

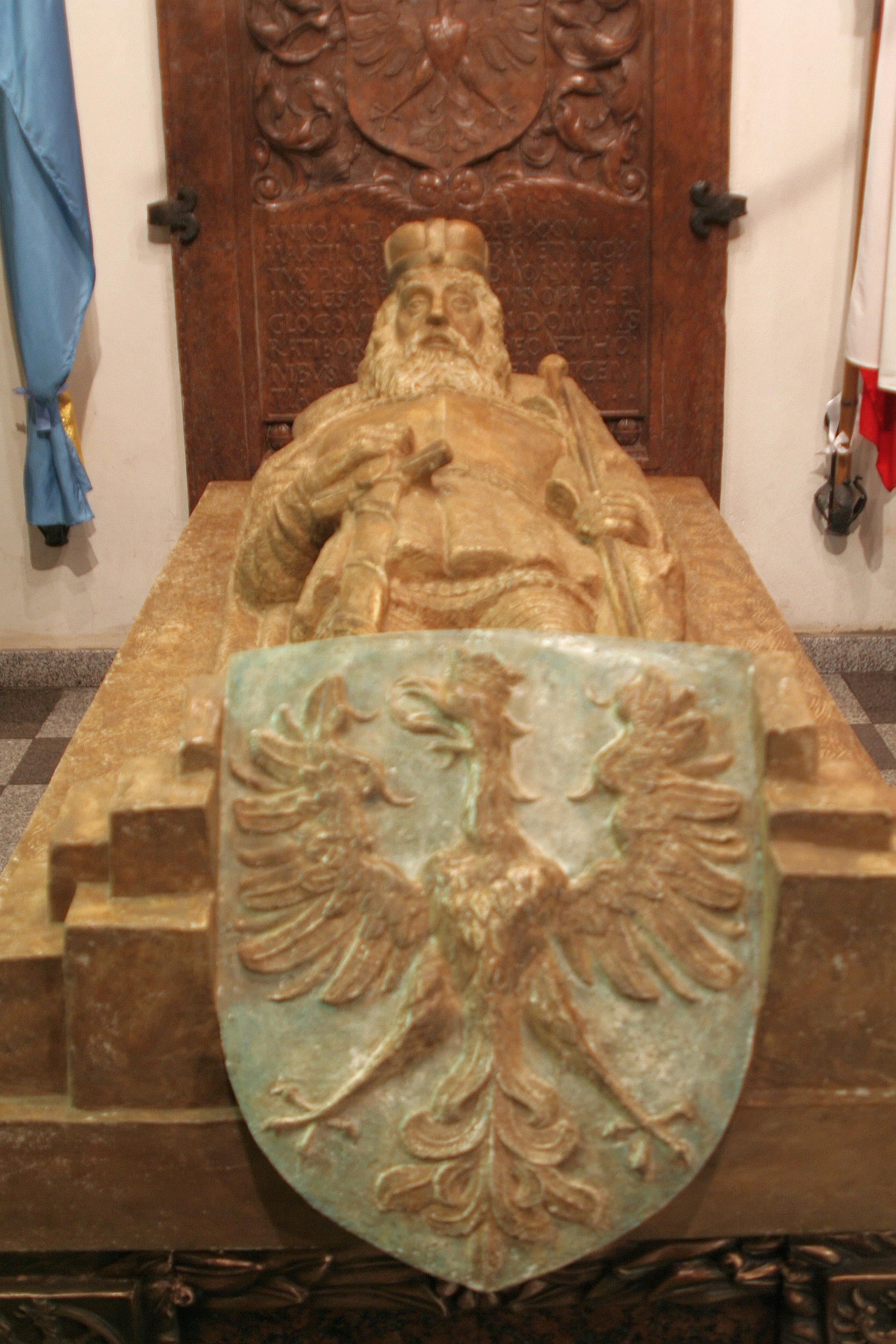
The sarcophagus of duke Jan II the Good, in Opole Cathedral, with his coat of arms, that served as a basis for the coat of arms of the Opole Voivodeship.

Over time, the coat of arms had been modified, with major change being appearance of the crown on eagle's head. It appeared for the first time in the coat of arms of duke Casimir of Bytom in 13th century, and became the permanent feature of the design in late 14th century, beginning with duke Bolko IV of Opole, and being used until the end of the Opole and Racibórz line of the dynasty, in 1532, with the death of duke Jan II the Good. In his will, he had written to give his coat of arms to the society of the Duchy of Opole and Racibórz, making it a symbol of the whole area and its population, rather than a symbol of royal family.

=== Province of Upper Silesia ===
The coat of arms of the Province of Upper Silesia used from 1926 to 1935.

The Province of Upper Silesia of the Free State of Prussia was established in 1919. It had officially adopted its coat of arms, designed by Otto Hipp, on 1 June 1926. It consisted of a blue escutcheon (shield) with a yellow (golden) crown on its top, with blue, white, and red gemstones on it. Within the upper portion of the escutcheon was placed an upper half of a yellow (golden) eagle with risen wings and its head facing viewer's left. In the bottom portion of the escutcheon was placed crossed yellow (golden) hammer and pick. In the middle of the escutcheon was placed a yellow (golden) scythe blade. The coat of arms was depict motives characteristic to Upper Silesia, including the golden eagle on a blue background, a scythe symbolizing agriculture, and crossed hammer and pick symbolizing the mining industry. The eagle being in cut in half represented the division of the historical Province of Silesia in 1919 into the provinces of Lower Silesia and Upper Silesia.

=== Opole Voivodeship ===
The Opole Voivodeship of Poland was established on 1 January 1999. Its currently-used coat of arms was based on historical coat of arms used by Jan II the Good, duke of Silesia, and adopted by the Opole Voivodeship Sejmik in April 2001.

== See also ==
- flag of the Opole Voivodeship
- coat of arms of Silesia
- coat of arms of the Silesian Voivodeship
