= Coat of arms of the Silesian Voivodeship =

Polish coat of arms

- Armiger: Silesian Voivodeship
- Adopted: 11 June 2001 (current version)
- Shield: Blue Iberian-style escutcheon
- Compartment: Yellow (golden) eagle with raised wings and head turned left

The coat of arms, that serves as the symbol of the Silesian Voivodeship, Poland, features a yellow (golden) eagle on a blue background. The current version of the coat of arms was adopted in 2001, and based on the historical coats of arms of Upper Silesia.

== Design ==
The coat of arms of the Silesian Voivodeship consists of a blue Iberian-style escutcheon (shield) with square top and rounded base. It features a yellow (golden) eagle with raised wings and head turned left. It was based on the historical coat of arms of Silesia.

== History ==
=== Silesian duchies ===
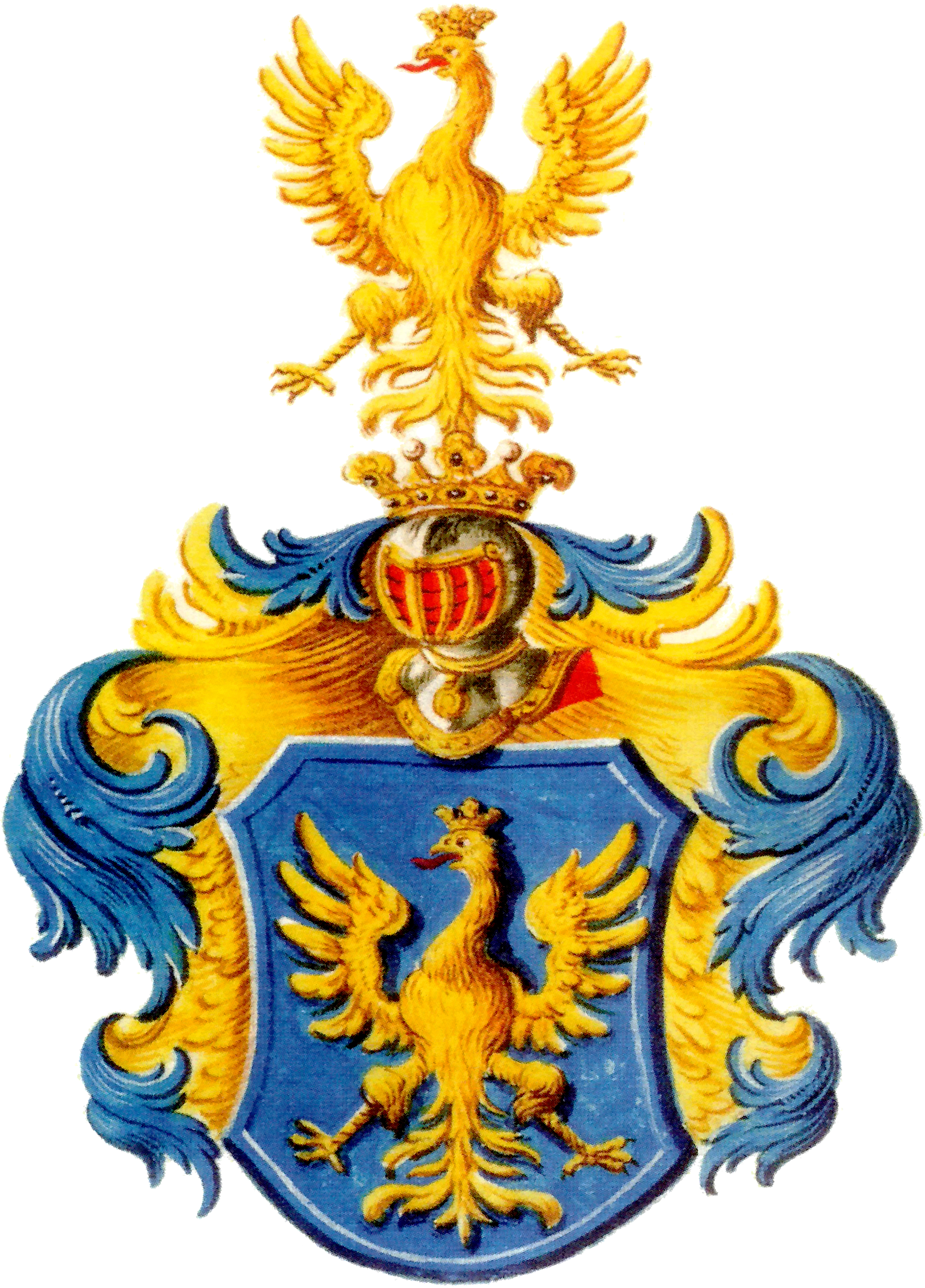
The 18th-century coat of arms of the Duchy of Teschen, under the rule of the Silesian Piast dynasty.

The first coat of arms recorded to be used by a ruler in the area of Upper Silesia, that featured an eagle, belonged to duke Casimir I of Opole, member of the Silesian Piast dynasty, who ruled the Duchy of Opole and Racibórz, from 1211 to 1230. Such design was recorded in a document from 1222, marked with Casimir's seal, that featured him holding a shield with an eagle on it. It remains unknown what colours the coat of arms had. The first known usage of a yellow (golden) eagle in the coat of arms had been recorded in the 1257 and 1260 seals of duke Vladislaus I of Opole, ruler of the Duchy of Opole and Racibórz. Since then, the coat of arms had been used by his descendants.

Over time, the coat of arms had been modified, with major change being appearance of the crown on eagle's head. It appeared for the first time in the coat of arms of duke Casimir of Bytom in 13th century, and became the permanent feature of the design in late 14th century, beginning with duke Bolko IV of Opole, and being used until the end of the Opole and Racibórz line of the dynasty, in 1532, with the death of duke Jan II the Good. In his will, he had written to give his coat of arms to the society of the Duchy of Opole and Racibórz, making it a symbol of the whole area and its population, rather than a symbol of royal family.

=== Province of Upper Silesia ===
The coat of arms of the Province of Upper Silesia used from 1926 to 1935.

The Province of Upper Silesia of the Free State of Prussia was established in 1919. It had officially adopted its coat of arms, designed by Otto Hipp, on 1 June 1926. It consisted of a blue escutcheon (shield) with a yellow (golden) crown on its top, with blue, white, and red gemstones on it. Within the upper portion of the escutcheon was placed an upper half of a yellow (golden) eagle with risen wings and its head facing viewer's left. In the bottom portion of the escutcheon was placed crossed yellow (golden) hammer and pick. In the middle of the escutcheon was placed a yellow (golden) scythe blade. The coat of arms was depict motives characteristic to Upper Silesia, including the golden eagle on a blue background, a scythe symbolizing agriculture, and crossed hammer and pick symbolizing the mining industry. The eagle being in cut in half represented the division of the historical Province of Silesia in 1919 into the provinces of Lower Silesia and Upper Silesia.

=== Second Polish Republic ===
The design of the coat of arms of the Silesian Voivodeship proposed in 1928.

In 1928, as part of the project to design the coat of arms for the voivodeships of the Second Polish Republic, the design for the coat of arms of the Warsaw Voivodeship had been created. Though planned to be officially approved, it never was, as it was decided to postpone the approval of the subdivision symbols due to the planned administrative reform, that eventually took place in 1938. Eventually, the plans for the establishment of the coat of arms had been stopped by the Invasion of Poland by Nazi Germany, on 1 September 1939, that begun the World War II, and were not picked up back after the end of the conflict. Despite never being approved, the voivodeship unofficially used it as its symbol. The proposed design featured a yellow (golden) eagle with risen wings and its head turned to the viewer's left, placed a blue dark blue Heater-style escutcheon (shield)., with square top and pointed base.

=== Third Polish Republic ===
The coat of arms of the Katowice Voivodeship used from 1997 to 1998.

On 9 May 1997, the Katowice Voivodeship of Poland had adopted its coat of arms. It depicted a dark yellow (golden) eagle with risen wings and its head facing viewer's left, with a white (silver) crescent placed across its chest and wings. It was placed within a dark blue Heater-style escutcheon (shield). The Katowice Voivodeship ceased to exist on 31 December 1998, and was replaced by the Silesian Voivodeship on the next day. Its currently-used coat of arms had been adopted by the Silesian Voivodeship Sejmik on 11 June 2001.

== See also ==
- flag of the Silesian Voivodeship
- coat of arms of Silesia
- coat of arms of the Opole Voivodeship
