= Civic heraldry in the Czech Republic =

Aspect of public life in the Czech Republic

Flag of the Subcommittee for Heraldry and Vexillology of the Chamber of Deputies

Civic heraldry in the Czech Republic is regulated by law. As of 2017, 4,984 regions and municipalities have been authorized flags and coats of arms. In some cases these are ancient symbols granted during earlier historic periods, while in others they are newly devised achievements.

New grants of arms to local authorities are made by the President of the Chamber of Deputies acting on the advice of the parliamentary Subcommittee on Heraldry and Vexillology of the Committee on Science, Education, Culture, Youth and Sports. The subcommittee is, in turn, advised by a panel of experts it designates. Once granted, arms and flags are recorded in the Register for Municipal Symbols (REKOS), a database maintained by the Chamber of Deputies. Arms and flags granted prior to the establishment of the Czech Republic are also recorded in the REKOS database.

== See also ==
- Czech heraldry
