= Czech heraldry =

The greater coat of arms of the Czech Republic includes the arms of Bohemia with the Bohemian lion, Moravia with a chequered eagle, and Silesia with a black eagle.

Czech heraldry was formed from 12th to 13th century by Premyslid dukes and kings of Bohemia, beginning with flaming eagle of Saint Wenceslaus on coins of Duke Frederick in 1179.

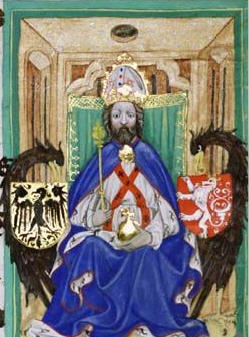
Emperor Charles IV with the Bohemian crowned lion and Premyslid eagle

From 1526 to 1918, it was greatly influenced by Austrian heraldry since the country used to be a part of the Habsburg monarchy, and by German heraldry, but also shows Hungarian and Slavic influences.

Until 1621, armorial bearings could be registered at the Royal Court of Bohemia in Prague. Then, until the dissolution of Austria-Hungary in 1918, they were recorded in Vienna, from which present-day Czech Republic was ruled.

The double-tailed silver Bohemian lion is seen in many municipal arms in Bohemia but also in Moravia and in the surrounding countries in areas which used to be under the Bohemian crown. Among these are České Budějovice (Budweis), Hostomice, Karlovy Vary, Kolín, Kutná Hora in Bohemia, Slavkov u Brna in Moravia as well as Wrocław in Poland and Zittau in Germany.

== See also ==
- Civic heraldry in the Czech Republic
