= Coat of arms of Liechtenstein =

National coat of arms of the Principality of Liechtenstein

- Greater version

Versions
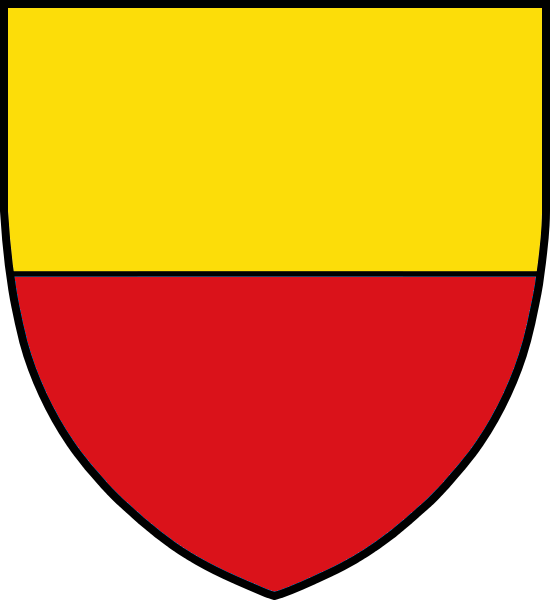
- Lesser version
- Armiger: Hans-Adam II, Prince of Liechtenstein
- Shield: Quarterly: I Or, an eagle displayed Sable crowned and armed Or charged with a crescent treflée, issuing from the middle thereof a cross pattée Argent (Silesia); II barry of eight Or and Sable, a crown of rue bendways throughout Vert (Kuenring); III per pale Gules and Argent (Duchy of Troppau); IV Or, a harpy displayed Sable the human parts Argent crowned and armed Or (Cirksena); on a point entée Azure, a bugle-horn stringed Or (Duchy of Jägerndorf); en surtout, an inescutcheon per fess or and Gules (House of Liechtenstein)
- Other elements: Behind the shield, a Princely mantle Purpure lined ermine, ensigned with the Princely hat

The coat of arms of Liechtenstein is the arms of dominion of the Prince of Liechtenstein, currently Hans-Adam II. As the sovereign emblem of the Prince, its use is restricted to the Prince and members of his House, though private individuals are permitted to use the arms if it is in the interest of the State. The arms are a history of the House of Liechtenstein and show some of the different territories and families with which it has been connected, either by acquisition or by marriage.

== Description ==
The first quarter shows the arms of Silesia, the second the arms of the Kuenring family (which should not be mistaken for the arms of Saxony), the third the arms of the Duchy of Troppau, and the fourth a variant of the arms of the Cirksena family of Agnes von Ostfriesland (representing the County of Rietberg). The base is occupied by the arms of the Duchy of Jägerndorf, while the arms of the Princely House itself are displayed on an inescutcheon.

The whole shield is surrounded by a purple (purpure) mantle with ermine lining, along with fringes and tassels of gold. At the top is placed the Princely hat.

The arms of the Princely House are sometimes used alone, and thus form the Lesser Arms of Liechtenstein. When shown alone, the arms are ensigned by the Princely hat.

== See also ==
- Flag of Liechtenstein
