= Austrian heraldry =

Austrian heraldry are the armorial bearings (known as armory) and other heraldic symbols once used by the Austrian monarchy. They are closely related to German heraldry, as Austria is a Germanophone country, but it show some particularities of their own, partly due to the mutual influence to and from the lands of the former Habsburg monarchy.
