= Coat of arms of Silesia =

Coat of arms of Silesia and Lower Silesia
- Armiger: Lower Silesia
- Adopted: 1224
- Shield: Or, an eagle displayed Sable armed with a crescent treflée, issuing from the middle thereof a cross pattée Argent

Coat of arms of Upper Silesia
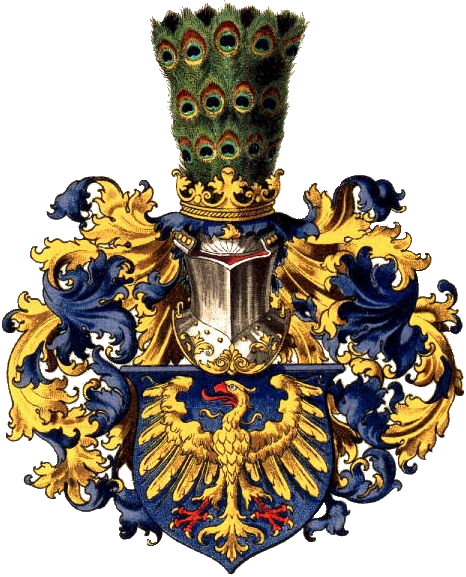
- Armiger: Upper Silesia
- Adopted: 1222
- Shield: Azure, an eagle displayed Or

The coat of arms of Silesia and Lower Silesia displays a black eagle with silver crescent with a cross in the middle on its chest—the emblem of Silesian Duke Henry the Bearded (Zgorzelec)—on a golden background. It has been assumed in the tradition that the coat of arms and colors of Lower Silesia are simultaneously used as symbols of Silesia as a whole.

The coat of arms of Upper Silesia shows a golden eagle on a blue background.

In the Polish heraldry, the Silesian eagle is usually not crowned (with the exception of Cieszyn Silesia), in the Czech and German it is usually the opposite.

== History ==
=== Lower Silesia ===
For the first time the coat of arms was placed on the seal of Henry II the Pious, which he used in the years 1224-1240. He used this seal during his father's lifetime (until 1238), and also after his death when he inherited the duchy. This coat of arms was also on the seals of successive dukes of Lower Silesia:

- dukes of Wrocław: Henry III the White, Henryk IV Probus,
- dukes of Legnica: Bolesław II the Horned, Henry V the Fat, Boleslaw III the Wasteful,
- dukes of Głogów: Konrad I of Głogów, Henry III of Głogów,
- dukes of Świdnica, Jawor and Ziębice: Bolko I the Strict, Bernard of Świdnica, Henry I of Jawor, Bolko II of Ziębice.

The coat of arms was used by most of the dukes of Lower Silesia in the 2nd half of the 14th century, however, some did not add the cross to the crescent. Such practice took place in the Duchy of Oleśnica and Duchy of Brzeg. As Silesia was more divided, other colors of the eagle were also adopted. For example, in the Duchy of Świdnica, the coat of arms depicted a half red–black eagle with a crescent on a silver and golden background.

The emblem of the Lower Silesian Piasts has been incorporated by cities, villages, municipality, and counties of Lower Silesia into their coats of arms and flags, emphasizing their belonging to the region or their relations with the ruling dukes.

The coat of arms of the Lower Silesian Piasts dynasty became one of the elements of the identity of the region of Lower Silesia. The coat of arms was adopted by the authorities of the Kingdom of Prussia in the coats of arms of large administrative units such as the Prussian Province of Silesia, the Province of Lower Silesia, and by the authorities of the Austrian Empire in the coat of arms of an autonomous region of Austrian Silesia.

In the interwar years, the coat of arms was incorporated into the middle and the greater coat of arms of Czechoslovakia. Also in 1993, in the coat of arms of the Czech Republic, a black eagle with crescent and a crown on its head, symbolizing Silesia, was placed in one field.

In 1957, the coat of arms of Liechtenstein was adopted, on which a black eagle with crescent and a crown on its head, symbolizing Silesia, was placed. It refers to the Duchy of Opava and Duchy of Krnov, that were ruled by Karl I, Prince of Liechtenstein since 1613 and 1623.

The Constitution of Saxony from 1992 allows the use of the coat of arms of Lower Silesia in the Silesian part of the state on an equal footing with Saxon symbols. It is a part of the coat of arms of the district of Görlitz.

The coat of arms of Lower Silesia was adopted into following coat of arms of administrative regions:

- coat of arms of Lower Silesian Voivodeship (2000),
- coat of arms of Moravian-Silesian Region (2000),
- coat of arms of Olomouc Region (2000).
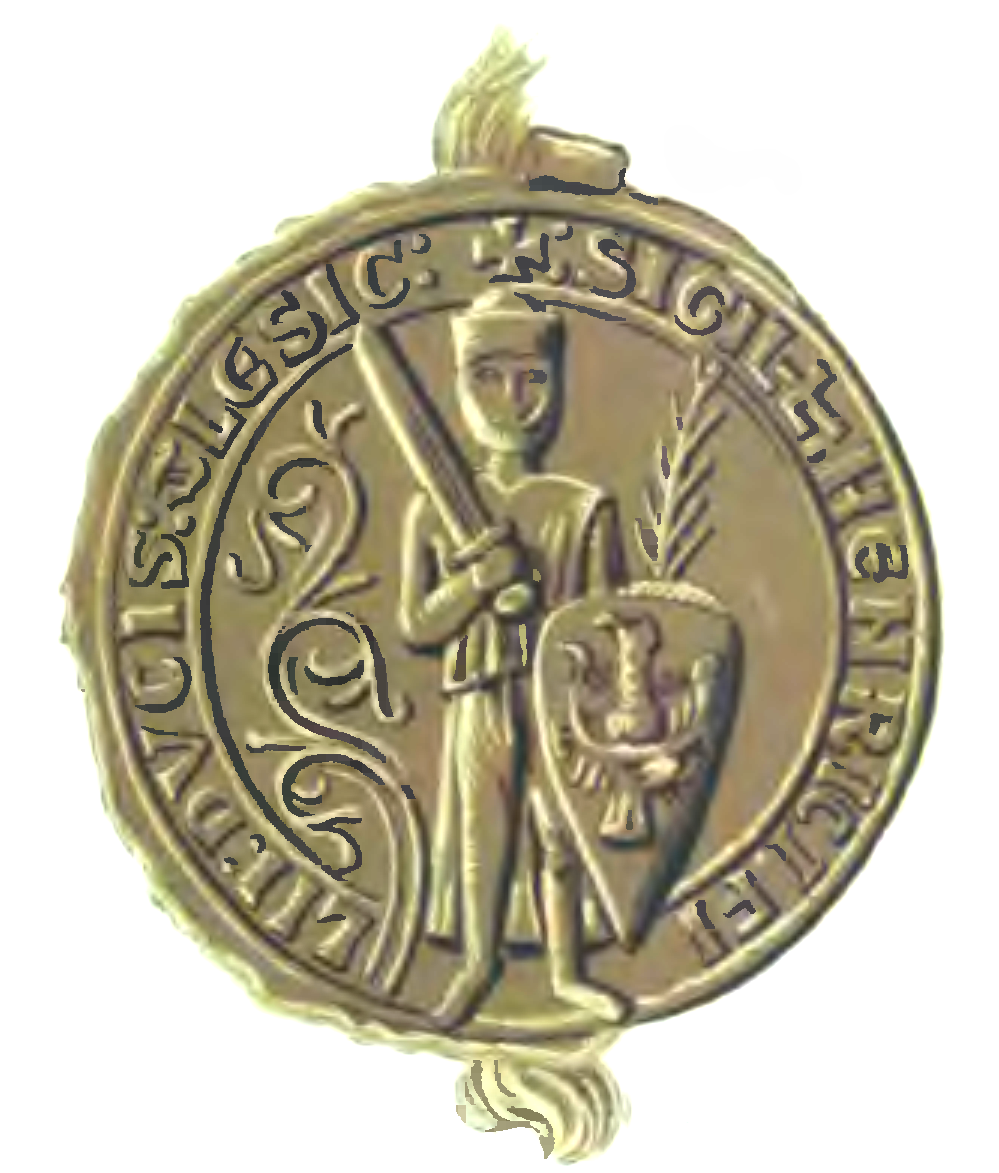
Henry II the Pious' seal

Coat of arms of the Duchy of Świdnica

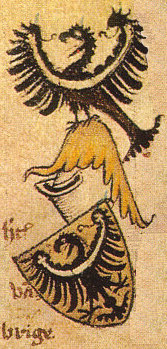
Arms of Louis I of Brzeg from the Gelre Armorial

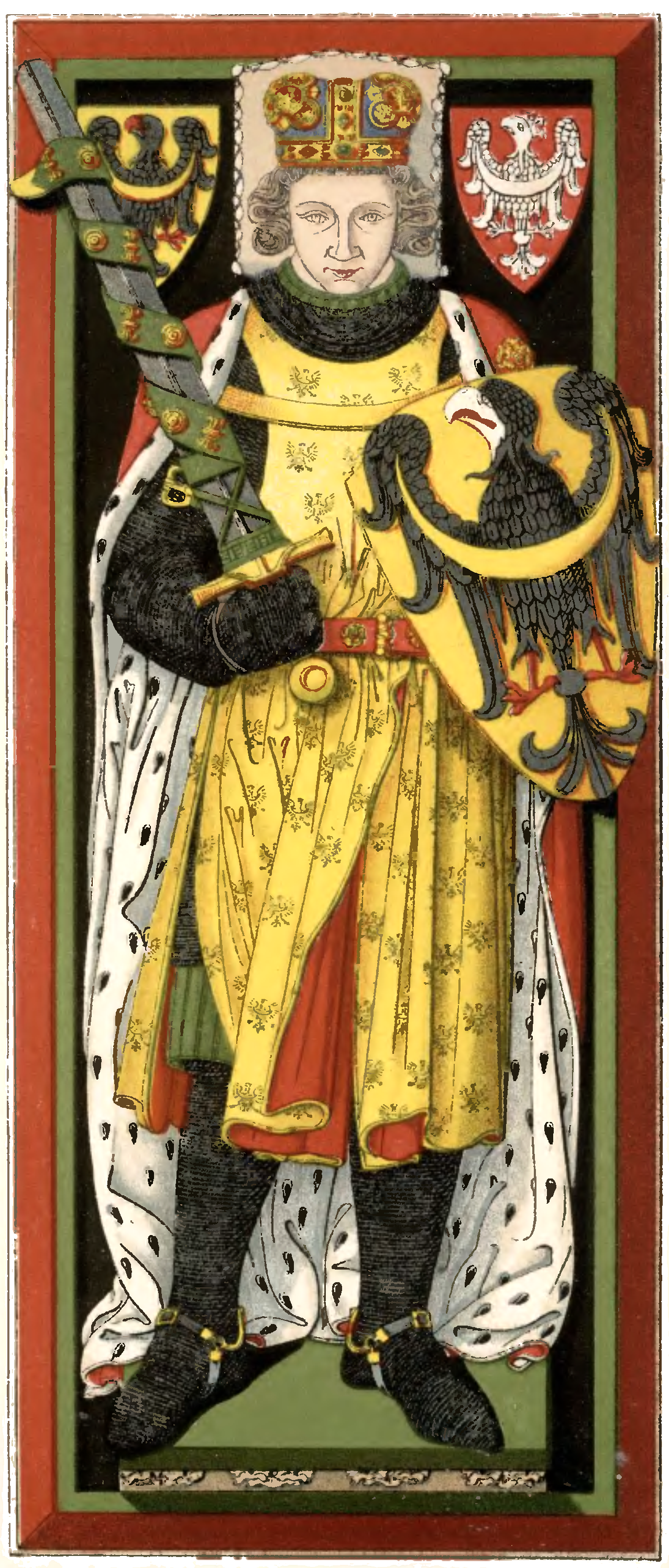
Arms of Henryk IV Probus

Lesser coat of arms of the Prussian Province of Silesia

Greater coat of arms of the Prussian Province of Silesia

Coat of arms of Austrian Silesia

Coat of arms of the Prussian Province of Lower Silesia

Middle Coat of Arms of Czechoslovakia

Greater Coat of Arms of Czechoslovakia

Coat of Arms of Liechtenstein

Coat of arms of Czech Silesia

Greater coat of arms of the Czech Republic

Coat of arms of the Lower Silesian Voivodeship (from 2000 to 2009)

Coat of arms of the Lower Silesian Voivodeship (from 2009 onwards)

Coat of arms of the Moravian-Silesian Region

Coat of arms of the Olomouc Region

Coat of arms of the Görlitz District

=== Upper Silesia ===
The Upper Silesian coat of arms was in use since at least the year 1222 as the document from this year had a seal of Opole–Racibórz Duke Casimir I of Opole featuring a Duke holding a shield with a gothic eagle on it. It is not known whether the coat of arms had different colours from the coats of arms with the eagles of the other Piasts since the colourful iconographic evidence dates back to the 14th century. On the basis of the seal on documents from the years 1257 and 1260, it is stated that the golden eagle was inherited by representatives of all Piast lines in Upper Silesia from Duke Władysław of Opole–Racibórz. The oldest colourful representation of the coat of arms of the Duchy of Opole has been preserved at the castle in Lauf an der Pegnitz near Nuremberg, where 114 coats of arms of principalities, bishoprics and cities were engraved in stone in 1353. On the coat of arms that is still preserved there to this day, there is a trace of yellow on the eagle and blue on the shield. This colouring is also confirmed by the Gelre Armorial from 1370-1395.

The coat of arms has undergone some stylistic changes and modifications, the largest of which is the crown on the head of the eagle. The crown was episodically introduced by the Duke of Bytom, Casimir of Bytom (2nd half of the 13th century), and then was used on seals and coats of arms continuously by the Dukes of Opole from the times of Bolko IV of Opole (2nd half of the 14th century) until the death of the last of the line of the Opole Piasts, Jan II the Good, in 1532. The last duke of Opole wrote down in his will his coat of arms to the states of the Duchy of Opole and Racibórz, which is considered to be a handover to the entire community of this land.

The emblem of the Upper Silesian Piasts has been incorporated by cities, villages, municipality, and counties of Upper Silesia into their coats of arms and flags, emphasizing their belonging to the region or their relations with the ruling dukes.

Established in 1919, the Prussian Province of Upper Silesia adopted on 1 June 1926 a new design of the coat of arms designed by the famous German heraldic and graphic artist Otto Hupp and it was in use to the demise of the province in 1938. It showed depleted golden eagle without tail and claws (which symbolised the separation of parts of Upper Silesia) and the main branches of the province's economy: agriculture (golden scythe blade) and mining (golden hammer and pick).

In the interwar years, the coat of arms of the Duchy of Cieszyn and the coat of arms of the Duchy of Opava and Racibórz (one field with a golden eagle) were incorporated into the greater coat of arms of Czechoslovakia.

The coat of arms of Upper Silesia was adopted into following coat of arms of administrative regions:

- coat of arms of Opole Voivodeship (2001),
- coat of arms of Silesian Voivodeship (2001),
- coat of arms of Moravian-Silesian Region (Coat of Arms of Duchy of Opava and Racibórz, 2000).
Casimir I of Opole's seal

Coat of arms of the Duchy of Opava and Racibórz

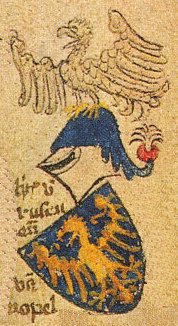
Arms of Vladislaus II of Opole from Gelre Armorial

Coat of arms of the Duchy of Cieszyn

Coat of arms of the Silesian Voivodeship (1920–1939)

Coat of arms of the Opole Voivodeship

Coat of arms of the Silesian Voivodeship

Coat of arms of the Prussian Province of Upper Silesia used 1926-1938

== See also ==
- Coat of arms of Moravia
- Coat of arms of Czechoslovakia
- Coat of arms of Austria-Hungary

== Literature ==
- Maximilian Gritzner: Landes- und Wappenkunde der Brandenburgisch-Preußischen Monarchie. Geschichte ihrer einzelnen Landestheile, deren Herrscher und Wappen. Heymann, Berlin 1894.
