= Province of Upper Silesia =

Province of Prussia (1919–1938; 1941–1945)

Province of Upper Silesia Provinz Oberschlesien (German)
- Province of Prussia
- 1919–1938; 1941–1945
- Flag Coat of arms

- Upper Silesia (Red) within the Free State of Prussia (Blue).
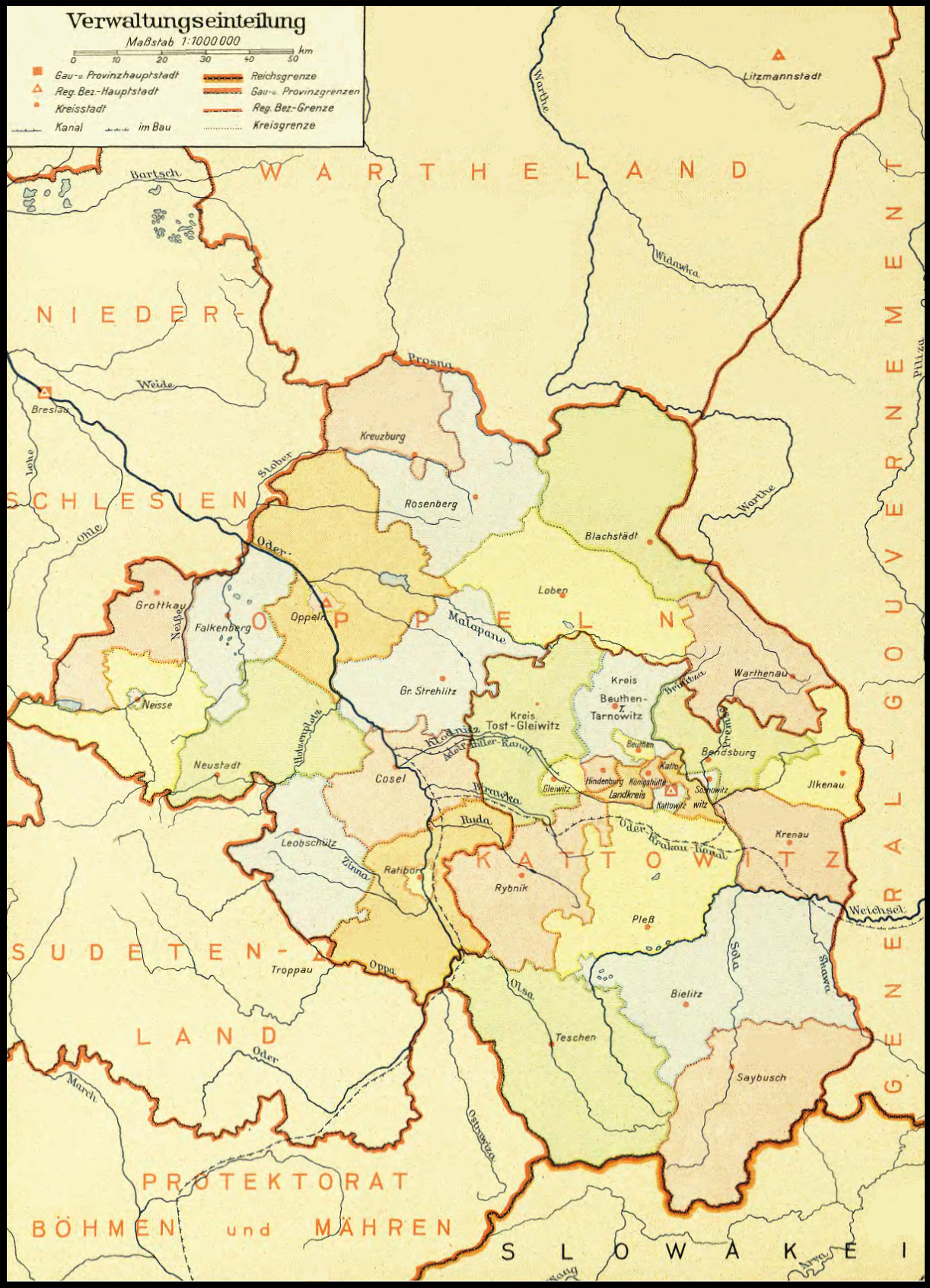
- Administrative districts and counties in the Gau of Upper Silesia (1943)
- Capital: Oppeln (1919–1938); Kattowitz (1941–1945)
- Area
  - Coordinates: 50°40′13″N 17°55′13″E
  - 1925: 9,702 km^{2} (3,746 sq mi)
- Population
  - 1925: 1,379,408
- History
  - Established: 1919
  - Merged with Lower Silesia: 1938–1941
  - Disestablished: 1945
- Political subdivisions: Kattowitz region Oppeln region
Preceded by
Province of Silesia
Silesian Voivodeship (1920–1939)
Succeeded by
Silesian Voivodeship (1920–1939)
Silesian Voivodeship (1945–1950)
District of Opolian Silesia
- Today part of: Poland; Czech Republic

The Province of Upper Silesia (German: Provinz Oberschlesien; Silesian German: Provinz Oberschläsing; Silesian: Prowincyjŏ Gōrny Ślōnsk; Polish: Prowincja Górny Śląsk) was a province of the Free State of Prussia between 1919 and 1945, except for the period 1938 to 1941 when it was reunited with Lower Silesia to form the Province of Silesia. It comprised much of the region of Upper Silesia and was eventually divided into two government regions (Regierungsbezirke) called Kattowitz (1939–1945), and Oppeln (1819–1945). The provincial capital was Oppeln (1919–1938) and Kattowitz (1941–1945), while other major towns included Beuthen, Gleiwitz, Hindenburg O.S., Neiße, Ratibor and Auschwitz, added in 1941 (the place of future extermination of Jews in World War II).

== History ==
=== Historical population ===
Perhaps the earliest exact census figures on ethnic or national structure of Regierungsbezirk Oppeln (Regierungsbezirk Kattowitz did not yet exist) are from 1819. In 1819 the Oppeln Region had 561,203 inhabitants, including the following "Nationalverschiedenheit":

Poles: 377,100 (67,2%)
Germans: 162,600 (29,0%)
Moravians: 12,000 (2,1%)
Jews: 8,000 (1,4%)
Czechs: 1,600 (0,3%)

The population more than doubled during the next five decades, reaching over 1,2 million inhabitants by year 1867, including around 742 thousand Poles and around 457 thousand Germans. The indigenous Polish population was subjected to Germanisation policies. The last pre-World War I general census figures available, are from 1910 (if not including the 1911 census of school children - Sprachzählung unter den Schulkindern - which revealed a higher percent of Polish-speakers among school children than the 1910 census among the general populace). Large demographic changes took place between 1819 and 1910, with the region's total population quadrupling, the percent of German-speakers increasing significantly, and that of Polish-speakers declining considerably. Also the total land area in which Polish was spoken, as well as the land area in which it was spoken by the majority, declined between 1790 and 1890. Polish authors before 1918 estimated the number of ethnic Poles in Prussian Upper Silesia as slightly higher than according to figures from official German censuses.

Exact ethnolinguistic figures for the 19th century and early 20th century can be found in Table 1.:

Table 1. Numbers of Polish, German and other inhabitants (Regierungsbezirk Oppeln)
Year	1819	1828	1831	1834	1837	1840	1843	1846	1852	1855	1858	1861	1867	1890	1900	1905	1910
Polish	377,100 (67.2%)	418,837 (61.1%)	443,084 (62.0%)	468,691 (62.6%)	495,362 (62.1%)	525,395 (58.6%)	540,402 (58.1%)	568,582 (58.1%)	584,293 (58.6%)	590,248 (58.7%)	612,849 (57.3%)	665,865 (59.1%)	742,153 (59.8%)	918,728 (58.2%)	1,048,230 (56.1%)	1,158,805 (57.0%)	Census, monolingual Polish: 1,169,340 (53.0%) or up to 1,560,000 together with bilinguals
German	162,600 (29.0%)	255,483 (37.3%)	257,852 (36.1%)	266,399 (35.6%)	290,168 (36.3%)	330,099 (36.8%)	348,094 (37.4%)	364,175 (37.2%)	363,990 (36.5%)	366,562 (36.5%)	406,950 (38.1%)	409,218 (36.3%)	457,545 (36.8%)	566,523 (35.9%)	684,397 (36.6%)	757,200 (37.2%)	884,045 (40.0%)
Other	21,503 (3.8%)	10,904 (1.6%)	13,254 (1.9%)	13,120 (1.8%)	12,679 (1.6%)	41,570 (4.6%)	42,292 (4.5%)	45,736 (4.7%)	49,445 (4.9%)	48,270 (4.8%)	49,037 (4.6%)	51,187 (4.6%)	41,611 (3.4%)	92,480 (5.9%)	135,519 (7.3%)	117,651 (5.8%)	Total population: 2,207,981

=== Weimar Republic ===
From 1919 to 1921 three Silesian Uprisings occurred among the Polish-speaking populace of Upper Silesia; the Battle of Annaberg was fought in the region in 1921. In the Upper Silesia plebiscite of March 1921, 59,4% voted against merging with Poland and 40,6% voted for, with clear lines dividing Polish and German communities. The exact border, the maintenance of cross-border railway traffic and other necessary co-operations, as well as equal rights for all inhabitants in both parts of Upper Silesia, were all fixed by the German-Polish Accord on East Silesia, signed in Geneva on 15 May 1922. On 20 June the Weimar Republic ceded, de facto, the eastern parts of Upper Silesia, becoming part of the Silesian Voivodeship of the Second Polish Republic. Within Weimar Germany, the Prussian Province of Silesia was divided into the provinces of Upper Silesia and Lower Silesia The territory remaining in Prussian Upper Silesia was administered within the Oppeln Region and—according to Polish sources—had 530,000 Poles within it.

=== Nazi Germany ===
After the Nazis' takeover in Germany, antisemitic laws were also introduced in German Upper Silesia, against the German-Polish Accord on East Silesia of 1922. Among other stipulations, according to the treaty each contractual party guaranteed in its respective part of Upper Silesia equal civil rights for all the inhabitants. The German Upper Silesian Franz Bernheim succeeded in convincing the League of Nations to force Nazi Germany to abide by the Accord, by filing the Bernheim petition. Accordingly, in September 1933 the Reich's Nazi government suspended in German Upper Silesia all antisemitic discrimination laws already imposed and excepted the province from all new such future decrees, until the Accord expired in May 1937.

The Polish population was also increasingly persecuted. The first conference of the Nazi anti-Polish organization Bund Deutscher Osten in Upper Silesia was held on 9 June 1933 in Gliwice. A secret Sicherheitsdienst report from 1934, mentioned Bytom, Gliwice, Prudnik, Strzelce Opolskie, Zabrze and the Olesno and Opole rural districts as the main centers of the Polish movement in the province. In August 1937, the Germans arrested 31 Polish youth activists.

The Province of Upper Silesia was joined to Lower Silesia to form the Province of Silesia in 1938. The persecution of Poles then further intensified.

==== World War II ====
After the invasion of Poland in 1939, Polish Upper Silesia, including the Polish industrial city of Katowice, was directly annexed into the Province of Silesia. This annexed territory, also known as East Upper Silesia (Ostoberschlesien), became part of the new Regierungsbezirk Kattowitz.

German occupation forces began a policy of repression against the Polish population of eastern Upper Silesia, which started as early as September 1939 based on lists made before the war that pointed out Poles active in social and political life. A second wave of arrests happened during October and November in Intelligenzaktion Schlesien, aimed against Polish intellectuals, many of whom perished in prison camps. A third wave of arrests came in April and May 1940 during the AB Aktion.

In Katowice, according to the historian Czesław Madajczyk, one of the harshests centres of oppression was the prison on Mikołowska street where people were reported to be murdered by Germans through the use of guillotine. A prison and penal camp were also established in the region in which Polish activists from Upper Silesia were held.

At the same time, the Polish population was expelled from eastern Upper Silesia; from 1939 until 1942, 40,000 Poles were expelled. In their place, ethnic Germans from Volhynia and the Baltic countries were settled in Upper Silesia's urban areas. Until 1943, about 230,000 ethnic Germans were located on the Polish territories of eastern Upper Silesia and the Wartheland. The death toll of the Polish population in Upper Silesia at the hands of Germans is about 25,000 victims, with 20,000 of them being from urban population.

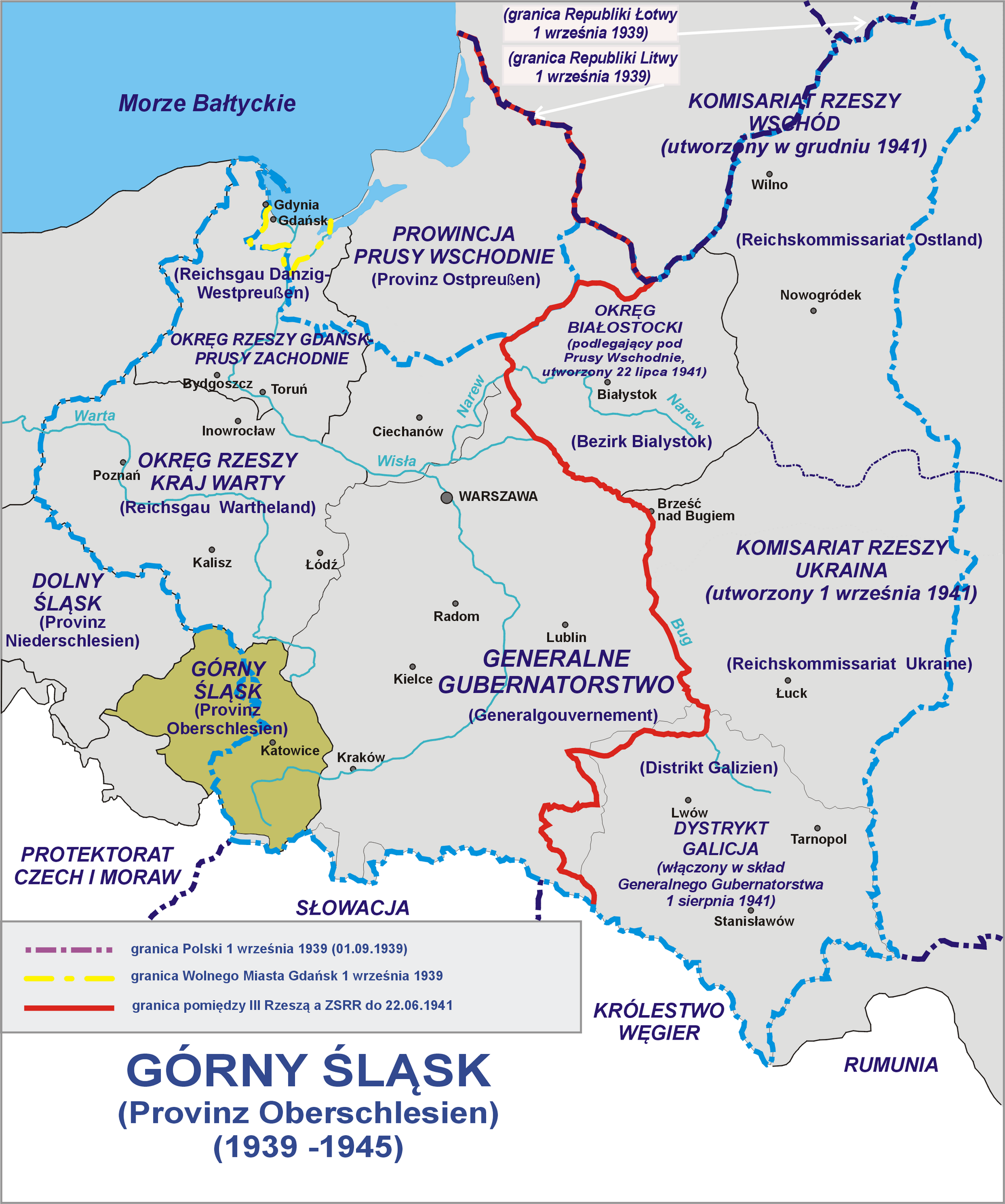
Province of Upper Silesia during World War II, composed of merged German and Polish territories.

In 1941, the Province of Silesia was again divided into the Provinces of Upper and Lower Silesia; German-occupied Katowice was made the capital of Upper Silesia instead of the smaller city of Oppeln (Opole).

The Germans established and operated a network of Polenlager forced labour camps, several subcamps of Auschwitz, and several prisoner-of-war camps, including Stalag VIII-B, Stalag VIII-F, Stalag Luft 7 and Oflag VIII-A, with numerous forced labour subcamps in the province, for Polish, French, Belgian, Dutch, British, Canadian, Australian, American and other Allied POWs.

The German province of Upper Silesia was conquered by the Soviet Red Army from February until the end of March 1945 during World War II's Lower and Upper Silesian Offensives. The post-war Potsdam Agreement granted the entire province's territory to the People's Republic of Poland; the territory is now in the Polish Opole and Silesian Voivodeships. Most Germans remaining in the territory were expelled westward in accordance with the Potsdam Agreement. The Landsmannschaft Schlesien represents German Silesians from Upper and Lower Silesia. Near and in Opole, a German minority remains.

Upper Silesia was known to be a poor, but heavily industrialised and polluted area. This was one of the Areas that P. G. Wodehouse was sent to after he was captured in the North of France as an Enemy Alien. He was said to have commented on the state of the area "If this is Upper Silesia, one has to wonder what Lower Silesia is like."

=== Post-war period ===
During the Polish post-war census of December 1950, data about the pre-war places of residence of the inhabitants as of August 1939 was collected. In case of children born between September 1939 and December 1950, their origin was reported based on the pre-war places of residence of their mothers. Thanks to this data it is possible to reconstruct the pre-war geographical origin of the post-war population. The same territory corresponding to pre-1938 Province of Upper Silesia (which became part of Poland in 1945) was inhabited as of December 1950 by:

1950 population by place of residence back in 1939:
Region (within 1939 borders):	Number	Percent
Autochthons (1939 DE/FCD citizens)	789,716	59.23%
Polish expellees from Kresy (USSR)	232,785	17.46%
Poles from abroad except the USSR	24,772	1.86%
Resettlers from the City of Warsaw	11,333	0.85%
From Warsaw region (Masovia)	7,019	0.53%
From Białystok region and Sudovia	2,229	0.17%
From pre-war Polish Pomerania	5,444	0.41%
Resettlers from Poznań region	8,936	0.67%
Katowice region (East Upper Silesia)	91,011	6.83%
Resettlers from the City of Łódź	1,250	0.09%
Resettlers from Łódź region	13,046	0.98%
Resettlers from Kielce region	16,707	1.25%
Resettlers from Lublin region	7,600	0.57%
Resettlers from Kraków region	60,987	4.57%
Resettlers from Rzeszów region	23,577	1.77%
place of residence in 1939 unknown	36,834	2.76%
Total pop. in December 1950	1,333,246	100.00%

Before the war, German Upper Silesia was home to a very large ethnically Polish/Silesian minority in Germany, so the flight and expulsion of Germans did not affect the region as much. In 1950, most of the region's population were its autochthons, who had had German citizenship before World War II, and were granted Polish citizenship after 1945. There were also many newcomers, especially from Eastern Poland annexed by the USSR and from pre-war Polish Upper Silesia.

== Government regions ==
(As of 1 January 1945)

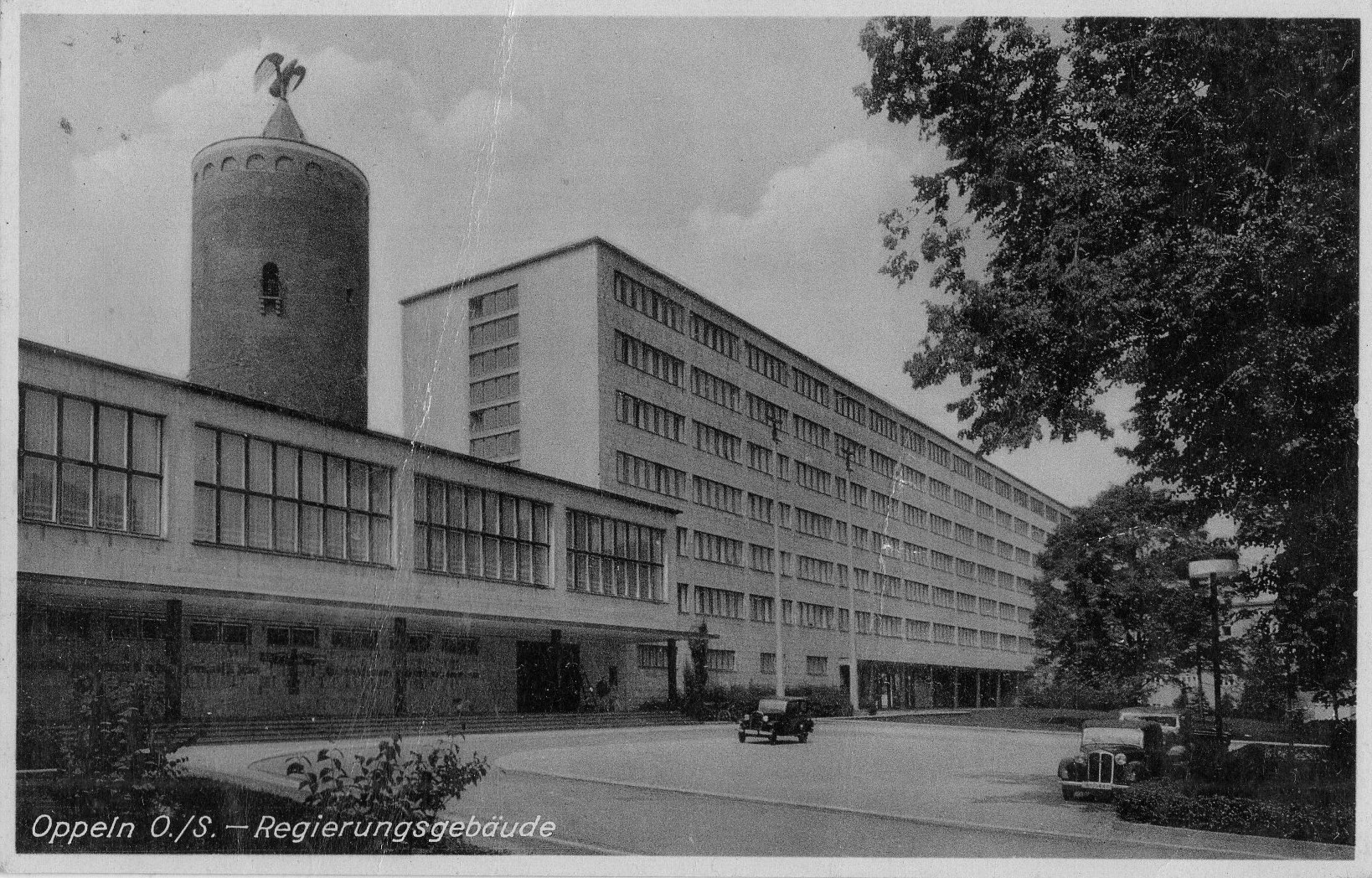
Government building in Oppeln (Opole), 1930s

=== Regierungsbezirk Kattowitz ===
Urban districts (Stadtkreise)

1. City of Beuthen
2. City of Gleiwitz
3. City of Hindenburg in Oberschlesien
4. City of Kattowitz
5. City of Königshütte

Rural districts (Landkreise)

1. Landkreis Bendsburg
2. Landkreis Beuthen-Tarnowitz
3. Landkreis Bielitz
4. Landkreis Kattowitz
5. Landkreis Krenau
6. Landkreis Ilkenau
7. Landkreis Pless
8. Landkreis Rybnik
9. Landkreis Saybusch
10. Landkreis Teschen
11. Landkreis Tost-Gleiwitz

=== Regierungsbezirk Oppeln ===
Urban districts (Stadtkreise)

1. City of Nysa (Neisse)
2. City of Opole (Oppeln)
3. City of Racibórz (Ratibor)

Rural districts (Landkreise)

1. Landkreis Blachstädt
2. Landkreis Cosel
3. Landkreis Falkenberg in Oberschleisen
4. Landkreis Groß Strehlitz
5. Landkreis Grottkau
6. Landkreis Guttentag
7. Landkreis Kreuzburg in Oberschlesien
8. Landkreis Leobschütz
9. Landkreis Lublinitz
10. Landkreis Neisse
11. Landkreis Neustadt in Oberschlesien
12. Landkreis Oppeln
13. Landkreis Ratibor
14. Landkreis Rosenberg
15. Landkreis Warthenau
