= Eagle (heraldry) =

Heraldic bird

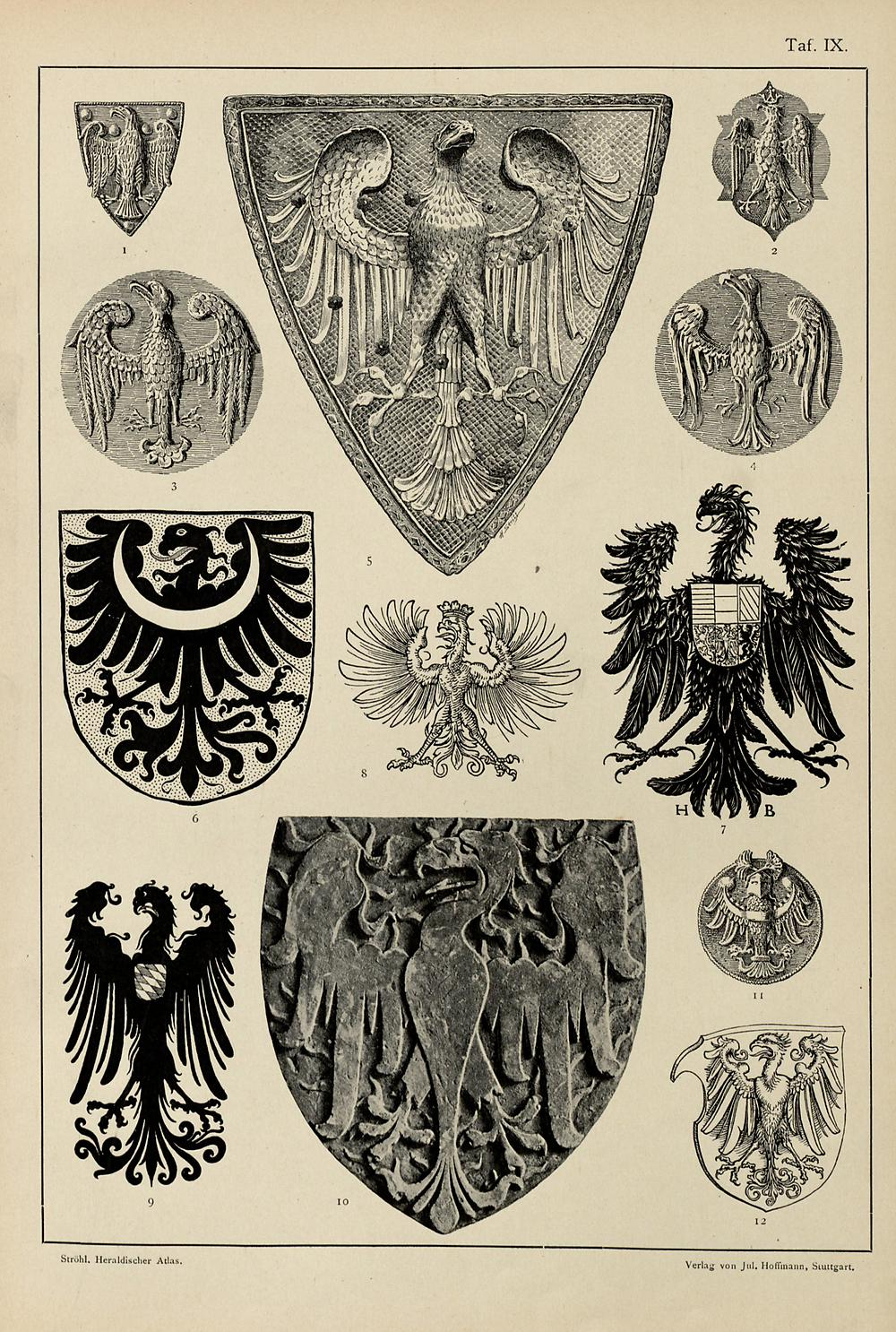
Examples of heraldic eagles of the 13th to 16th centuries, from Hugo Gerard Ströhl's Heraldischer Atlas

The eagle is used in heraldry as a charge, as a supporter, and as a crest. Heraldic eagles can be found throughout world history like in the Achaemenid Empire or in the present Republic of Indonesia. The European post-classical symbolism of the heraldic eagle is connected with the Roman Empire on one hand (especially in the case of the double-headed eagle), and with Saint John the Evangelist on the other.

== History ==
A golden eagle was often used on the banner of the Achaemenid Empire of Persia. Eagle (or the related royal bird vareghna) symbolized khvarenah (the God-given glory), and the Achaemenid family was associated with eagle (according to legend, Achaemenes was raised by an eagle). The local rulers of Persis in the Seleucid and Parthian eras (3rd-2nd centuries BC) sometimes used an eagle as the finial of their banner. Parthians and Armenians used eagle banners, too.

=== European heraldry ===
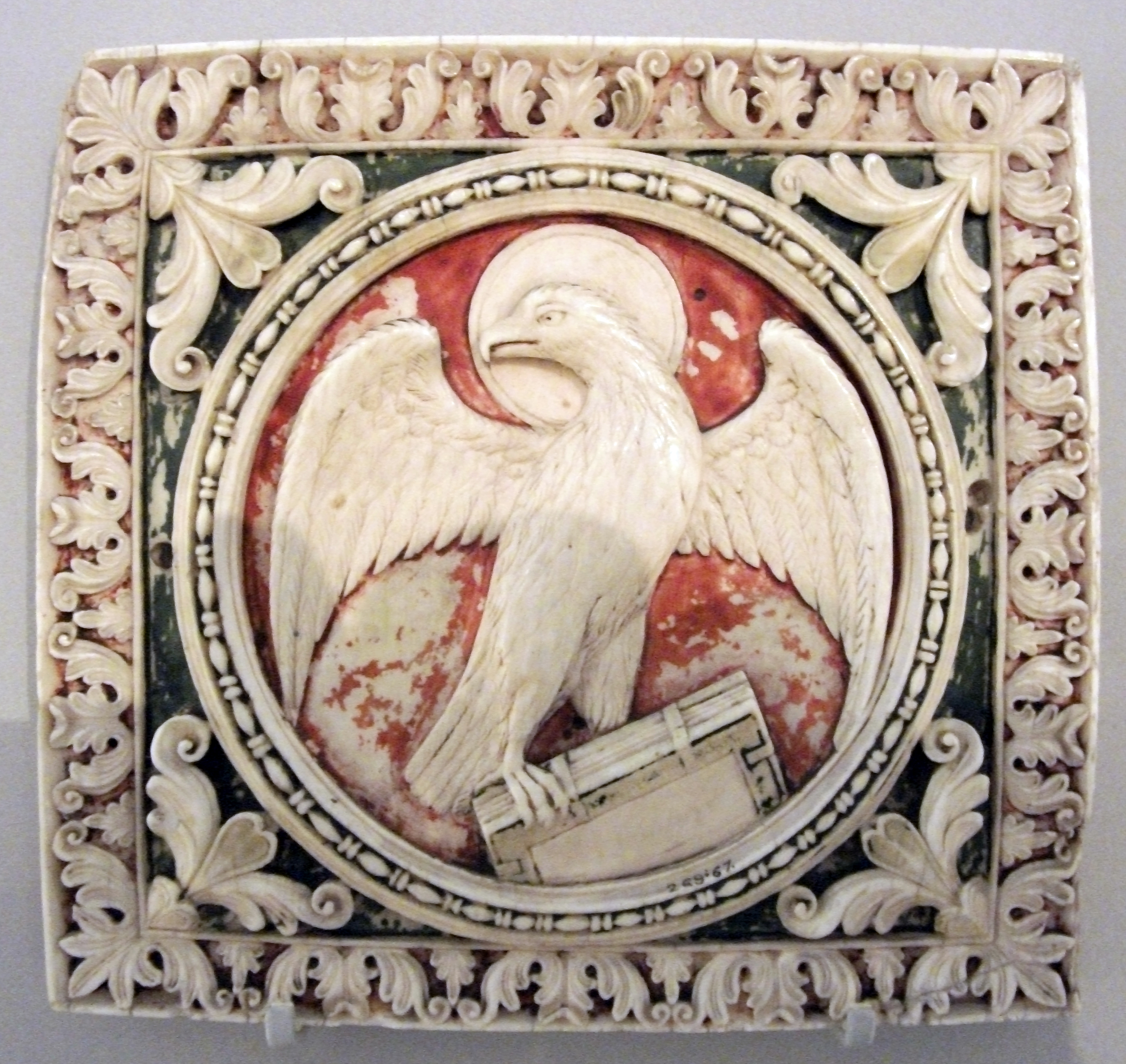
Carolingian ivory plaque with the Eagle of Saint John with halo, Victoria & Albert Museum.

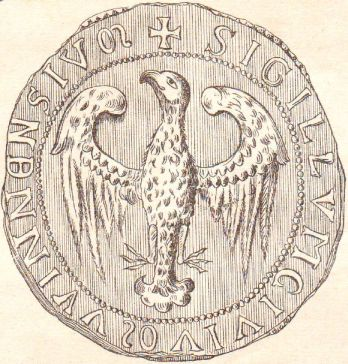
An early heraldic eagle in the seal of Vienna (1239)

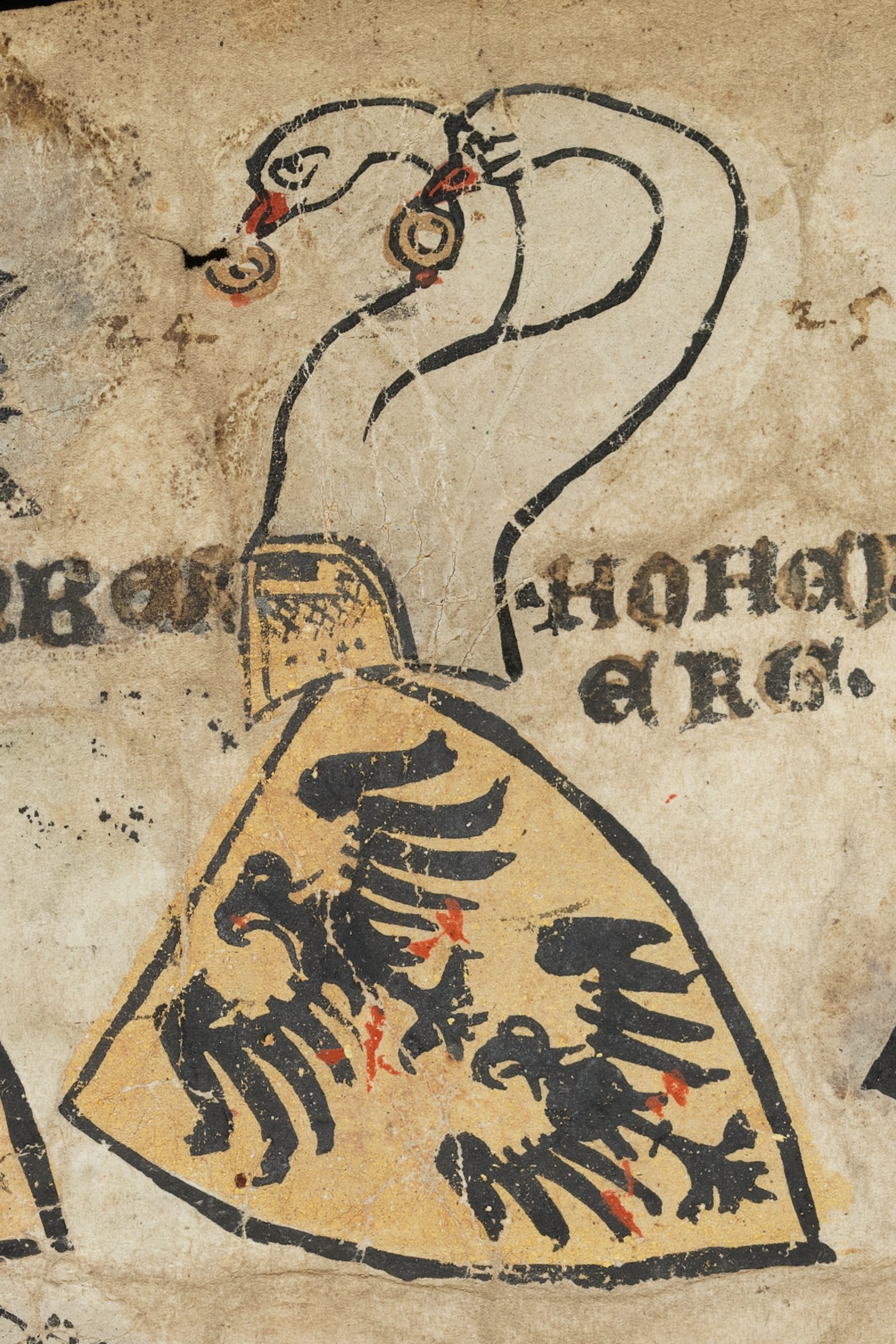
Or two eagles sable armed gules for Homberg (Zürich armorial, c. 1340). At this time, the black-on-gold eagle could still be used for a family of the lower nobility without association to the imperial eagle. (Note: Depiction of this coat of arms for Wernher von Homberg as participant in the Italian campaign of Henry VII in Codex Balduini due to the similarity with the imperial coat of arms had long been misinterpreted as representing Henry himself.)

Royal coat of arms for Frederick IV of Germany (1446)

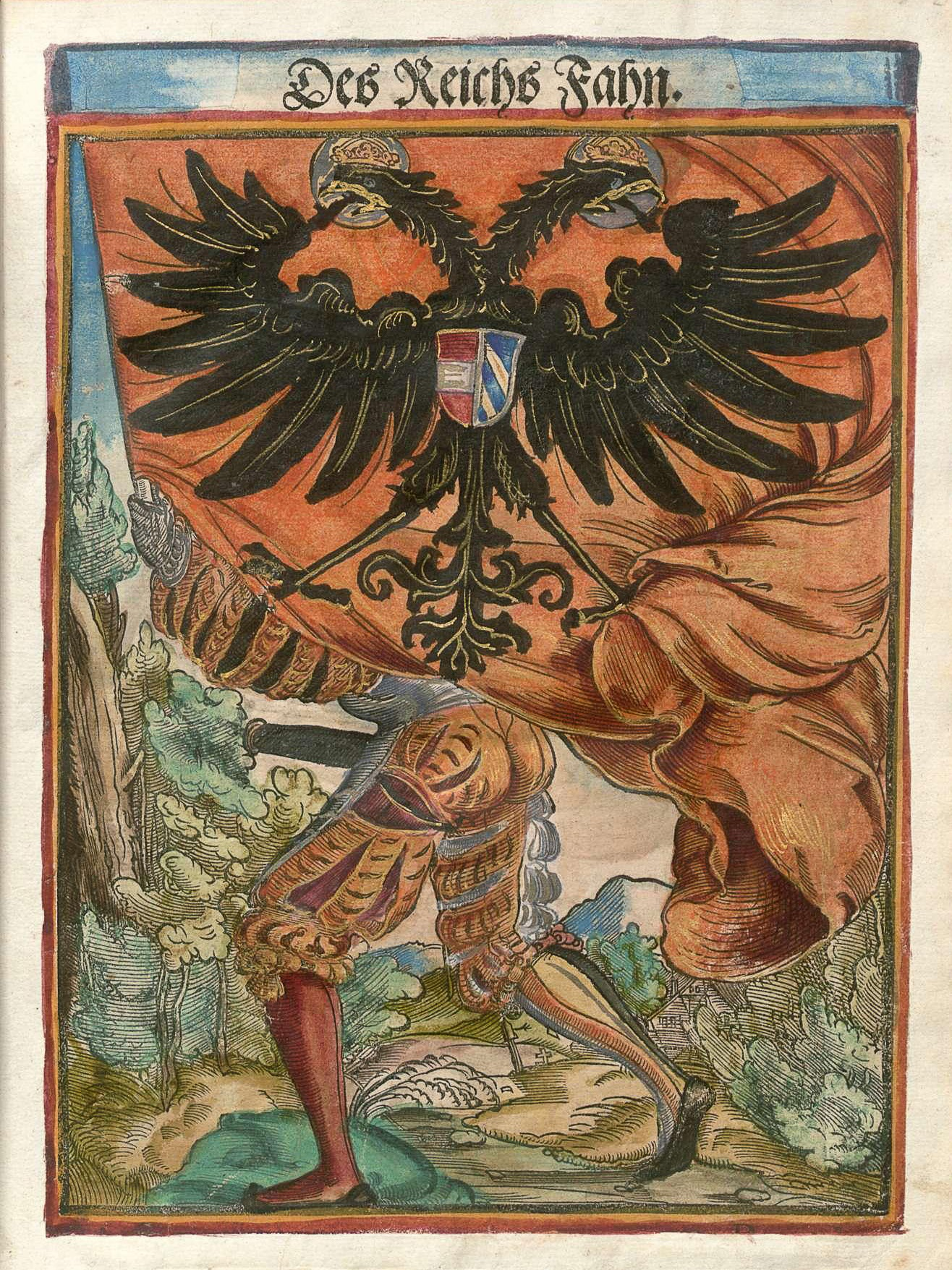
Imperial banner for Charles V (Jakob Kallenberg 1545)

In Europe the iconography of the heraldic eagle, as with other heraldic beasts, is inherited from early medieval tradition. It rests on a dual symbolism: On one hand it was seen as a symbol of the Roman Empire (the Roman Eagle had been introduced as the standardised emblem of the Roman legions under consul Gaius Marius in 102 BC); on the other hand, the eagle in early medieval iconography represented Saint John the Evangelist, ultimately based on the tradition of the four living creatures in Ezekiel.

In early heraldry or proto-heraldry of the 12th century, however, the eagle as a heraldic charge was not necessarily tied to either imperial or biblical symbolism. The Anglo-Norman L'Aigle family, who held Pevensey castle and the Borough of Pevensey, used the eagle as an emblem in an instance of canting arms. The earliest known use of the eagle as a heraldic charge is found in the Great Seal of Leopold IV of Austria, dated 1136. Adalbert I, Duke of Teck used an eagle in his seal in c. 1190.

By the late medieval period, in German heraldry the eagle developed into a symbol of the Holy Roman Empire, and thus became comparatively rare outside of coats of arms derived from the Imperial Eagle. The Imperial Eagle was and is denominated the Reichsadler. The first evidence of the use of the double-headed Imperial Eagle dates to the mid-13th century (Chronica Majora, c. 1250; Segar's Roll, c. 1280). The German kings continued use of the single-headed eagle during the 14th century. In Italy, the Ghibelline faction (the faction loyal to the Emperor in the drawn-out conflict between emperors and popes) began to display or an eagle sable in chief of their coats of arms, known as capo dell'impero or "chief of the empire". Similarly, German cities began to incorporate the Imperial Eagle into their seals and coats of arms to imply Imperial immediacy. From such usage, use of the heraldic eagle by the end of the medieval period became so strongly associated with the Holy Roman Empire that the eagle was rarely used as an independent heraldic charge. Examples of continued use of an eagle in coats of arms based on traditions of the 13th century include the Polish, Moravian, and Silesian coats of arms.

By far the oldest and most common manner of depicting the eagle in heraldry is what would come to be known as displayed (éployée), in direct imitation of Roman iconography. The eagle's body is depicted with lateral symmetry, but its head is facing the dexter side. In late medieval blasons, the term "eagle" (Middle French egle) without specification refers to an "eagle displayed". In early modern English terminology, it became common to use "eagle displayed". Also specific to English heraldry is the distinction between "eagle displayed with its wings elevated" and "eagle displayed with wings inverted". This is due to a regional English convention of depicting the tips of the wings pointing upward, while in continental heraldry, the tips of the wings were depicted downward ("inverted"). Later, English heraldry partially adopted the continental convention, leading to a situation where it was unclear whether the two forms should be considered equivalent. In German heraldry, no attitude other than "eagle displayed with wings inverted" ever became current, so that the simple blason of "eagle" (Adler) still refers to this configuration. (Note: "it will be to English eyes, accustomed to our conventional spread-eagle, doubtless rather startling to observe that the German type of the eagle, which follows the Roman disposition of the wings (which so many of our heraldic artists at the present day appear inclined to adopt either in the accepted German or in a slightly modified form as an eagle displayed) is certainly not a true displayed eagle according to our English ideas and requirements, inasmuch as the wings are inverted. It should be observed that in German heraldry it is simply termed an eagle, and not an eagle displayed. Considering, however, its very close resemblance to our eagle displayed, and also its very artistic appearance, there is every excuse for its employment in this country, and I for one should be sorry to observe its slowly increasing favour checked in this country. It is quite possible, however, to transfer the salient and striking points of beauty to the more orthodox position of the wings. The eagle (compared with the lion and the ordinaries) had no such predominance in early British heraldry that it enjoyed in Continental armory, and therefore it may be better to trace the artistic development of the German eagle. [...] no one form can be said to be more correct than any other, either from the point of view of nature or from the point of view of ancient precedent. This state of affairs is eminently unsatisfactory, because in these days of necessary differentiation no heraldic artist of any appreciable knowledge or ability has claimed the liberty (which certainly has not been officially conceded) to depict an eagle rising with wings elevated and displayed, when it has been granted with the wings in the position addorsed and inverted. Such a liberty when the wings happen to be charged, as they so frequently are in modern English crests, must clearly be an impossibility.")

There is a gradual evolution of the standard depiction of the heraldic eagle over the course of the 12th to 16th centuries. In the 12th to 13th century, the head is raised and the beak is closed. The leading edge of the wings (in German heraldry termed Sachsen or Saxen, representing the main bones in the bird's wing, humerus and ulna) are rolled up at the ends into a spiral shape, with the remiges shown vertical. The tail is represented as a number of stiff feathers. By the later 14th century, the head is straightened, and the beak opens, with the tongue becoming visible. The rolling-up of the leading edge of the wings disappears. The claws now form an acute angle relative to the body, occasionally receiving a "hose" covering the upper leg. The tail feathers now spread out in curved lines. In the 15th century, the leading edge of the wings become half-circles, with the remiges no longer vertical but radiating outward. The legs form a right angles. In the 16th century, eventually, the depiction of the eagle becomes more extravagant and ferocious, the animal being depicted "it in as ornamental and ornate a manner as possible". Fox-Davies (1909) presents a schematic depiction of this evolution, as follows:

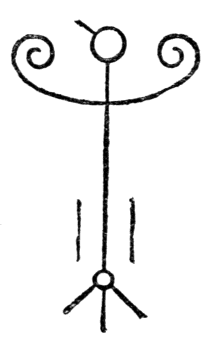
13th century: curled wing edges, straight tail feathers, vertical legs

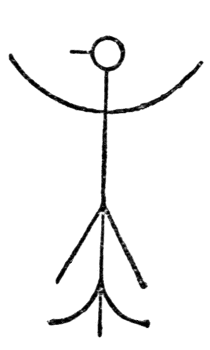
late 14th century: curved wing edges (vertical remiges), curved tail feathers, legs at an acute angle

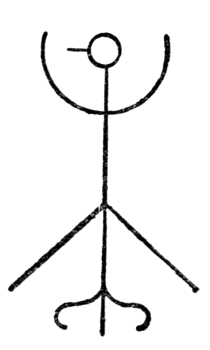
15th century: wing edges pointing upward (radiating remiges), more ornate tail feathers, legs at a right angle
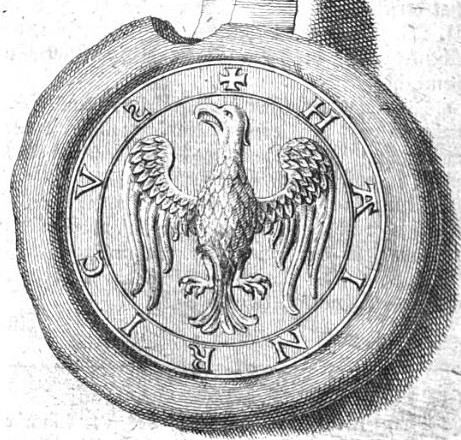
13th century example (Henry I, Duke of Mödling 1203)

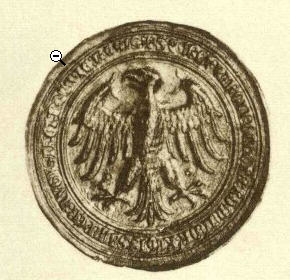
14th century example (Charles IV 1349)

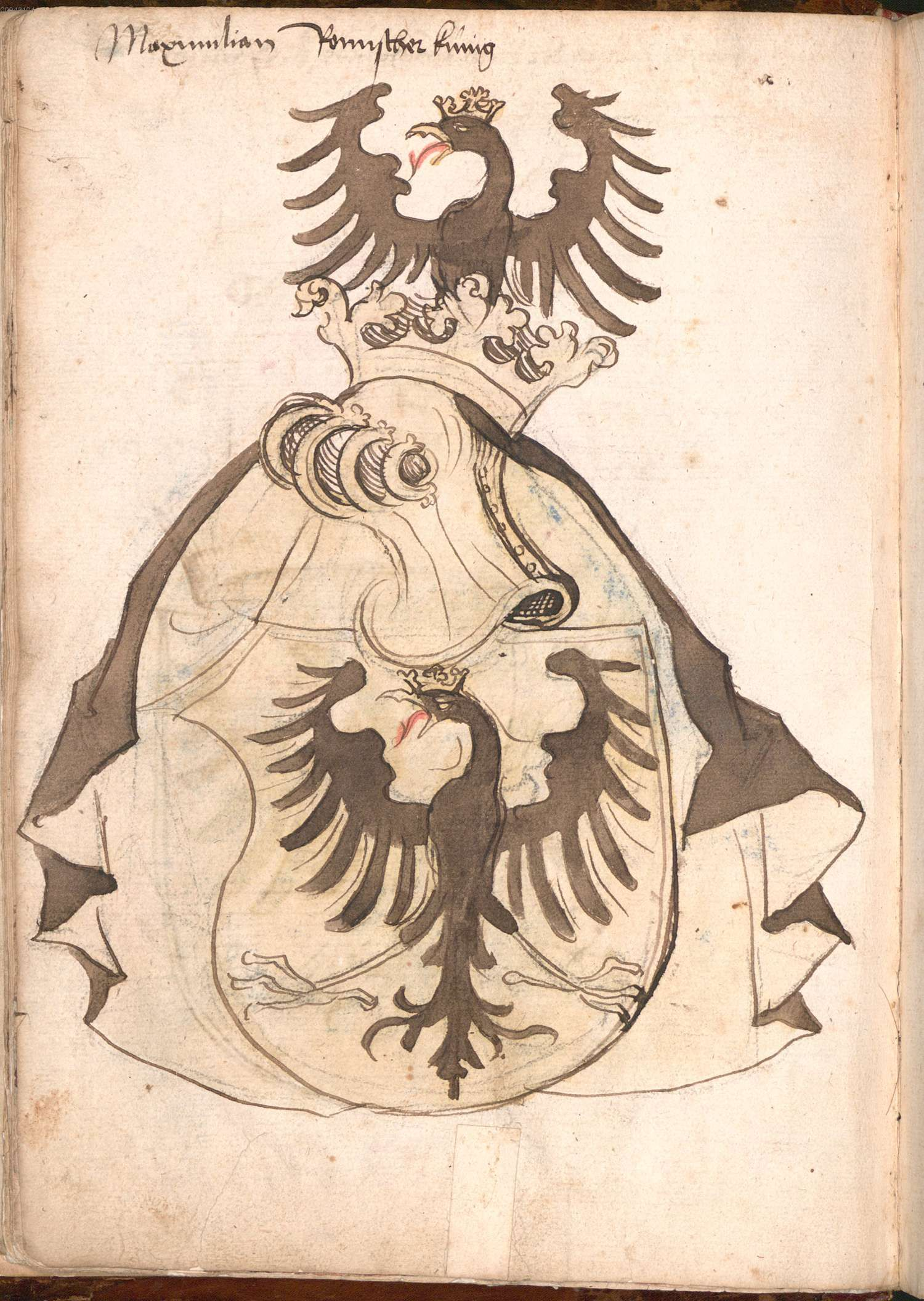
15th century example (Wernigeroder Wappenbuch c. 1480)

== Depiction ==
Eagle displayed

Eagle abaissé

The depiction of the heraldic eagle is subject to a great range of variation in style. The eagle was far more common in continental European—particularly German—than English heraldry, and it most frequently appears Sable (colored black) with its beak and claws Or (colored gold or yellow). It is often depicted membered (having limbs of a different color than the body) / armed (an animal depicted with its natural weapons of a different color than the body) and langued (depicted having a tongue of a different color than the body) gules (colored red), that is, with red claws / talons and tongue. In its relatively few instances in Gallo-British heraldry (e.g. the arms of the Earls of Dalhousie) the outermost feathers are typically longer and point upward.

=== Parts ===
==== Head ====
An eagle can appear either single- or double-headed (bicapitate), in rare cases triple-headed (tricapitate) eagle is seen. (Note: arms granted in 1957 to Waiblingen (kreis) The three heads symbolise the three former territories that were transformed into the district.)

An eagle can be displayed with his head turned to the sinister (left side of the field). In full aspect describes an eagle with his head facing the onlooker. In trian aspect (a rare, later 16th and 17th century heraldry term) describes when the eagle's head is facing at a three-quarter view to give the appearance of depth – with the head cocked at an angle somewhere between profile and straight-on.

==== Wings ====
1. Eagle close. 2. Eagle rising, wings elevated and addorsed. 3. Eagle rising, wings elevated and displayed. 4. Eagle rising, wings addorsed and inverted. 5. Eagle rising, wings displayed and inverted.

Overture or close is when the wings are shown at the sides and close to the body, always depicted statant (standing in profile and facing the right side of the field). (Trussed - the term when depicting domestic or game birds with their wings closed - is not used because the eagle is a proud animal and the word implies it is tied up or bound by a net.)

Addorsed ("back to back") is when the eagle is shown statant (standing in profile and facing the right side of the field) and ready to fly, with the wings shown open behind the eagle so that they almost touch.

Espanie or épandre ("expanded") is when the eagle is shown affronté (facing the viewer with the head turned to the dexter) and the wings are shown with the tips upward.

Abaisé or abaissé ("lowered") is when the eagle is shown affronté (facing the viewer) and the wings are shown with the tips downward. A good example is the eagle on the reverse side of the US quarter-dollar coin.

Kleestängel, also Kleestengel or Klee-Stengeln ("clover-stems"), are the pair of long-stemmed trefoil-type charges originating in 13th-century German depictions of the heraldic eagle. They represent the upper edge of the wings and are normally Or (gold / yellow), like the beak and claws, as in the arms of Brandenburg or several versions of the arms of Prussia. Reinmar von Zweter fashioned the Klee-Stengeln of his eagle into a second and third head. In Polish the term is przepaska, which means "cloth" or "band" (in Latin, "perizonium" or "perisonium"), which may refer either to the Kleestängel, as in the Polish arms (white on a white eagle, formerly also gold on a white eagle) and others derived from it, or to the Brustspange as below.

Brustspange, also Brustmond or Brustsichel, is an elongated crescent across the breast and wings (in effect, a pair of Kleestängel extended to join each other). As with Kleestängel, there is no specific English term for this charge as it does not occur in English heraldry: it is usually blazoned simply as a crescent, and when the ends terminate in trefoils as a "crescent trefly" or "treflée". Sometimes there is a cross paty in the centre, notably in the arms of Silesia(silver on a black eagle) introduced in the early 13th century by either Duke Henry the Bearded or Duke Henry II the Pious, which occurs in numerous related arms.

Current coat of arms of Poland, with white przepaska

Coat of arms of Brandenburg, with gold Kleestängel

Coat of arms of Silesia and of the present Lower Silesian Voivodeship, with Brustspange (crescent-shaped przepaska)

=== Attitudes (positions) ===
==== Eagle displayed ====
The informal term "spread eagle" is derived from a heraldic depiction of an eagle displayed (i.e. upright with both wings, both legs, and tailfeathers all outstretched). The wings are usually depicted "expanded" or "elevated" (i.e., with the points upward); displayed inverted is when the wings are depicted points downward. According to Hugh Clark, An Introduction to Heraldry, the term spread eagle refers to "an eagle with two heads, displayed", but this distinction has apparently been lost in modern usage. Most of the eagles used as emblems of various monarchs and states are displayed, including those on the coats of arms of Germany, Romania, Poland and the United States.

Displayed is the most common attitude, with examples going back to the early Middle Ages.

==== Eagle rousant ====
Eagle essorant (rousant)

An eagle rising or rousant (essorant) is preparing to fly, but its feet are still on the ground. It is the eagle's version of statant (standing in profile and facing the right side of the field).

- with wings addorsed and elevated means in profile with the wings swept to the back and their tips extended upwards.
- with wings addorsed and inverted means in profile with wings swept to the back and their tips extended downwards.
- with wings displayed and elevated means facing to the front with the wings spread and their tips extended upwards.
- with wings displayed and inverted means facing to the front with the wings spread and their tips extended downwards.

There is sometimes confusion between a rousant eagle with displayed wings and a displayed eagle. The difference is that rousant eagles face to the right and have their feet on the ground and displayed eagles face the viewer, have their legs splayed out, and the tail is completely visible. There is a debate over whether rousant or displayed is the eagle's default depiction.

==== Eagle volant ====
Volant describes an eagle in profile shown in flight with wings shown addorsed and elevated and its legs together and tucked under. It is considered in bend ("diagonal") as it is flying from the lower sinister (heraldic left, from the shield-holder's point of view) to the upper dexter (heraldic right, from the shield-holder's point of view) of the field. However, the term "in bend" is not used unless a bend is actually on the field.

==== Eagle recursant ====
An eagle shown recursant has its back towards the viewer, e.g., "An eagle volant recursant descendant in pale" is an eagle flying downward in the vertical center of the shield with its back towards the viewer.

==== Eagles combatant ====
Like the heraldic lion, the heraldic eagle is seen as dominating the field and normally cannot brook a rival. When two eagles are depicted on a field, they are usually shown combatant, that is, facing each other with wings spread and one claw extended, as though they were fighting. Respectant, the term used for depicting domestic or game animals shown facing each other, is not used because eagles are aggressive predators.

==== Eagles addorsed ====
When two eagles are shown back-to-back and facing the edges of the field the term used is addorsed / endorsed or adossés ("back-to-back").

=== Variants ===
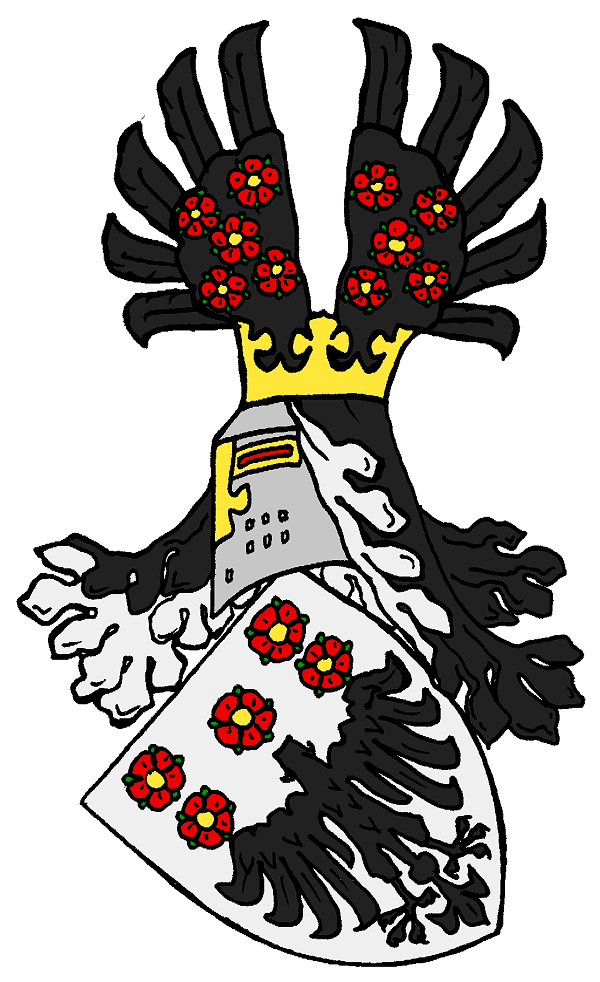
Eagle decapitate (without head), coat of arms of German nobility von der Hoven, alias: "Pampus".

==== Eaglet ====
This term is used when three or more Eagles are shown on a field. They represent immature eagles.

==== Alerion ====
Originally the term erne or alerion in early heraldry referred to a regular eagle. Later heralds used the term alerion to depict baby eagles. To differentiate them from mature eagles, alerions were shown as an eagle displayed inverted without a beak or claws (disarmed). To difference it from a decapitate (headless) eagle, the alerion has a bulb-shaped head with an eye staring towards the dexter (right-hand side) of the field. This was later simplified in modern heraldry as an abstract winged oval.

An example is the arms of the Duchy of Lorraine (Or, on a Bend Gules, 3 Alerions Abaisé Argent). It supposedly had been inspired by the assumed arms of crusader Geoffrey de Bouillon, who supposedly killed three white eaglets with a bow and arrow when out hunting. It is far more likely to be canting arms that are a pun based on the similarities of "Lorraine" and "erne".

== Imperial Eagle ==
The Aquila was the eagle standard of a Roman legion, carried by a special grade legionary known as an Aquilifer, from the second consulship of Gaius Marius (104 BC) used as the only legionary standard. It was made of silver, or bronze, with outstretched wings. The eagle was not immediately retained as a symbol of the Roman Empire in general in the early medieval period. Neither the early Byzantine emperors nor the Carolingians used the eagle in their coins or seals. It appears that the eagle is only revived as a symbol of Roman imperial power in the high medieval period, being featured on the sceptres of the Ottonians in the late 10th century, and the double-headed eagle gradually appearing association with the Komnenos dynasty in the 11th and 12th centuries.

=== Holy Roman Empire ===
Reconstruction of the 14th-century royal flag (Königsfahne), with a single-headed eagle, the predecessor of the 15th-century imperial flag with the double-headed imperial eagle

The eagle is used as an emblem by the Holy Roman Emperors from at least the time of Otto III (late 10th century), in the form of the "eagle-sceptre".

Frederick Barbarossa (r. 1155–90) is reported as having displayed an eagle on his banner, Otto IV (r. 1209–15) an eagle hovering over a dragon. The first evidence of the use of the Reichsadler (imperial eagle) proper dates to the mid-13th century. Matthew Paris' Chronica Majora (c. 1250) displays a coat of arms with a black double-headed eagle in a yellow field for Otto IV. Segar's Roll (c. 1280) displays the same coat of arms, or, an eagle sable beaked and armed gules for the "king of Germany" (rey de almayne). Outside of these exceptional depictions (in sources from outside of Germany), the double-headed eagle remains unattested as emblem of the German kings or emperors until the 1430s. In the 14th century, the German kings used the royal banner (Königsfahne) with the single-headed eagle. The earliest pictorial representations of this date to the first half of the 14th century (Codex Balduini). This banner develops into the Reichssturmfahne (imperial war flag) with the double-headed Reichsadler (imperial eagle) by the mid-15th century. Sigismund (r. 1433–37) still uses either the single-headed or the double-headed eagle. Consistent use of the double-headed eagle only begins with the Habsburg emperors (with Frederick III, 1440). After 1558 (Ferdinand I), the title of King of the Romans is used for the emperor's heir apparent; the double-headed eagle now represents the emperor, and the single-headed eagle the emperor's heir apparent (thus, Ferdinand IV, King of the Romans, who pre-deceased his father in 1654 and never became emperor, is given a single-headed eagle only).

=== Byzantine imperial eagle ===
Double-headed eagle emblem of the Byzantine Empire. The head on the left (West) symbolizes Rome, the head on the right (East) symbolizes Constantinople.

Use of the double-headed eagle is first attested in Byzantine art of the 10th century. Its use as an imperial emblem, however, is considerably younger, attested with certainty only in the 15th century, i.e. at about the same time the double-headed eagle was also adopted in the Holy Roman Empire. There are speculative theories according to which the double-headed eagle was first introduced as a dynastic emblem of the Komnenoi, from as early as the 11th century. (Note: "Ο φωτισμένος αυτός Αυτοκράτορας καταγόταν από Οίκο της Παφλαγονίας, όπου στην πόλη Γάγγρα υπήρχε ο θρύλος της ύπαρξης φτερωτού αετόμορφου και δικέφαλου θηρίου (γνωστού ως Χάγκα), το οποίο και κοσμούσε το θυρεό του κτήματος της οικογένειάς του στην Καστάμονη." O fotisménos aftós Aftokrátoras katagótan apó Oíko tis Paflagonías, ópou stin póli Gángra ypírche o thrýlos tis ýparxis fterotoú aetómorfou kai dikéfalou thiríou (gnostoú os Chánka), to opoío kai kosmoúse to thyreó tou ktímatos tis oikogéneiás tou stin Kastámoni. Rough translation: "This enlightened Emperor came from the House of Paphlagonia, where in the city of Gagra there was the legend of a creature with raptor's wings and beast's chest (known as The Haga), which adorned the shield of his family estate in Kastamon." It is unclear where Zapheiriou's term Haga (Χάγκα) is taken from; it does not appear to find further reflection in scholarly literature, but it was adopted by historical fiction author Gordon Doherty in his book Strategos: Island in the Storm) The Palaiologoi emperors appear to have used the double-headed eagle often as ornamental emblem on their robes etc. during the 13th and 14th century, but only in the 15th century as an emblem on coins or seals. In the 15th century, the double-heade eagle was first used as an emblem by the semi-autonomous Despots of the Morea, who were younger imperial princes, and by the Gattilusi of Lesbos, who were Palaiologan relatives and vassals. The double-headed eagle was used in the breakaway Empire of Trebizond as well. Western portolans of the 14th–15th centuries use the double-headed eagle (silver/golden on red/vermilion) as the symbol of Trebizond rather than Constantinople. Single-headed eagles are also attested in Trapezuntine coins, and a 1421 source depicts the Trapezuntine flag as yellow with a red single-headed eagle. Apparently, just as in the metropolitan Byzantine state, the use of both motifs, single and double-headed, continued side by side. Other Balkan states followed the Byzantine model as well: chiefly the Serbians, but also the Bulgarians and Albania under George Kastrioti (better known as Skanderbeg), while after 1472 the eagle was adopted by Muscovy, when Ivan III of Russia married Sophia, daughter of Thomas Palaiologos.

The Serbian eagle (in the modern coat of arms of Serbia, 1882) is derived from the coat of arms of the Nemanjić dynasty (16th century), in turn derived from the Byzantine imperial eagle. Use of the double-headed eagle for Serbia is among the examples of early representations in Western portolans (Angelino Dulcert 1339).

== Eagle of Saint John ==
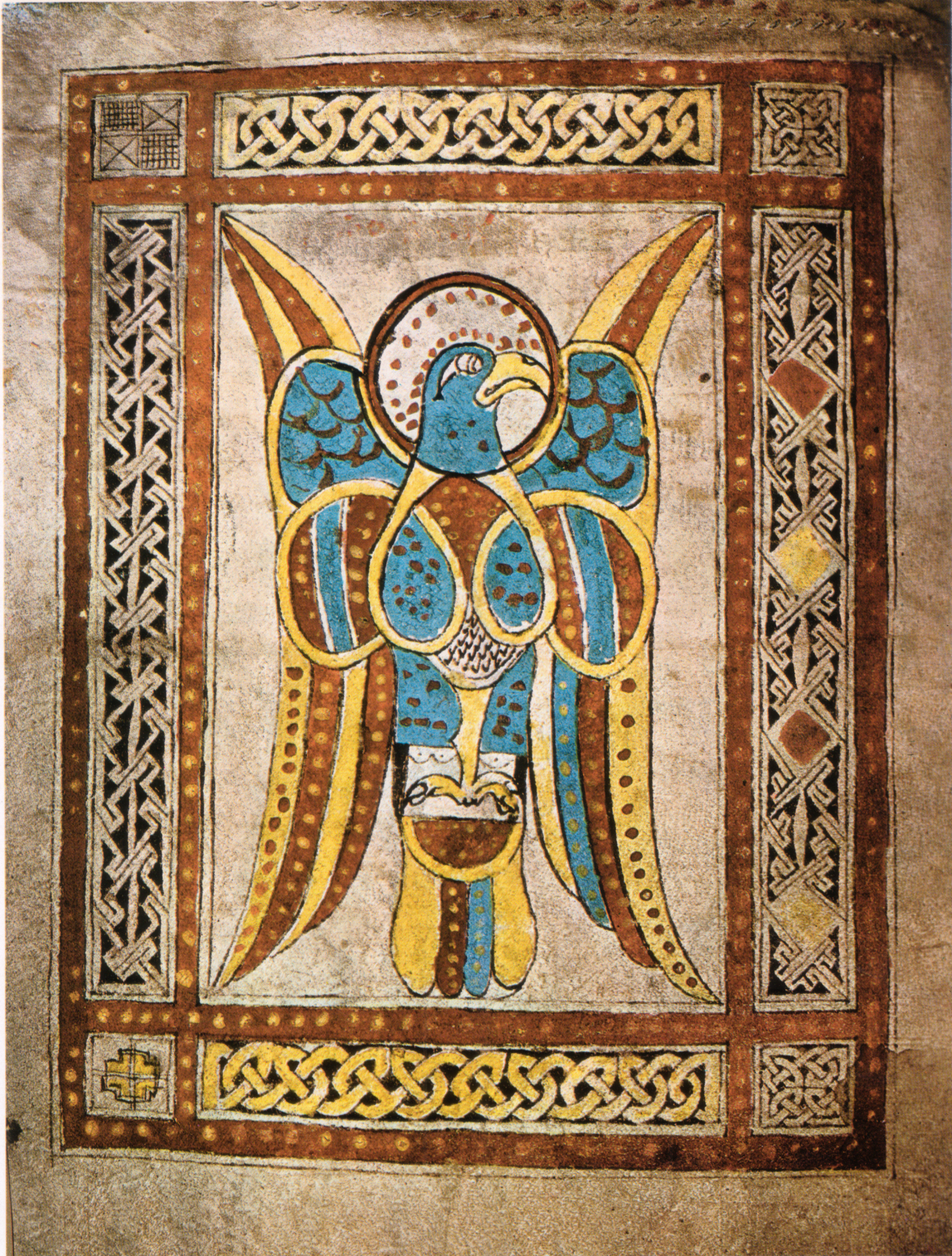
Eagle of Saint John from the Book of Dimma (8th century)

John the Evangelist, the author of the fourth gospel account, is symbolized by an eagle, king of the birds, often with a halo. The eagle is a figure of the sky, and believed by Christian scholars to be able to look straight into the sun.

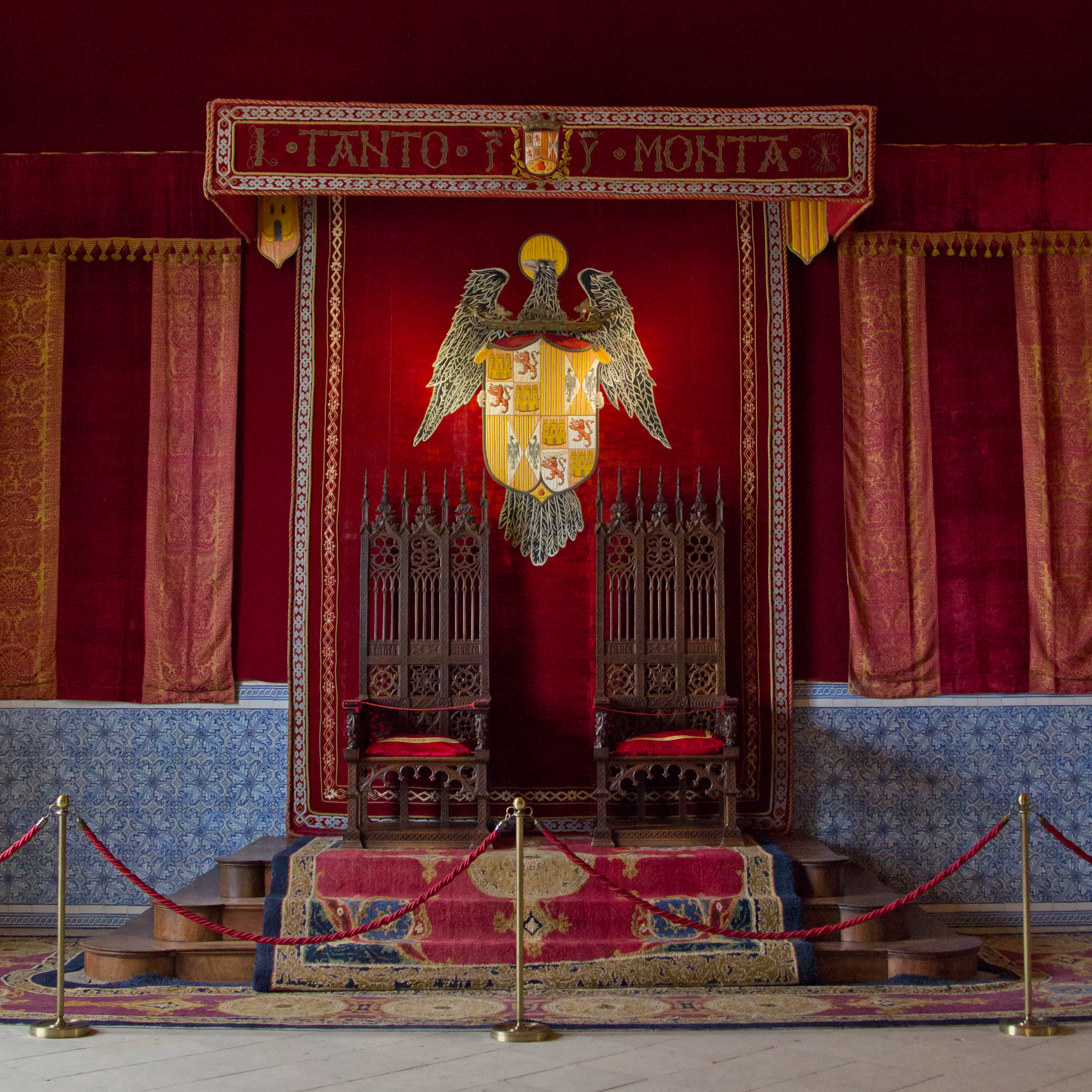
Tapestry with the armorial achievement of the Catholic Monarchs in the Throne Room of the Alcazar of Segovia

The best-known heraldic use of the Eagle of St. John has been the single supporter chosen by Queen Isabella of Castile in her armorial achievement used as heiress and later integrated into the heraldry of the Catholic Monarchs. This election alludes to the queen's great devotion to the evangelist that predated her accession to the throne.

The Eagle of St. John supported the shields used by Catherine of Aragon, daughter of the Catholic Monarchs, as queen consort of England, and by Mary I and King Philip as joint monarchs of England. In Spain, Philip bore the Eagle of St John (variously one or two) in his ornamented armorial achievements until 1668.

The Eagle of the Evangelist was restored as single supporter holding the 1939, 1945 and 1977 official models of the armorial achievement of Spain, but been removed in 1981 when the current design was adopted. The eagle was used by the Spanish dictator Francisco Franco as a symbol of his regime. It is also frequently used in modern civic heraldry.

== Piast and Přemyslid dynasties ==
The eagles in the Polish, Moravian and Silesian coats of arms are based on 13th-century dynastic arms. The Silesian Piasts was the first branch of Piast dynasty to use an eagle for their coat of arms. The first documented use of the Upper Silesian Eagle was on the Casimir I of Opole's seal in 1222 and was later followed by the first use of the Lower Silesian Eagle by the Henry II the Pious in 1224. Przemysł II was the first Polish ruler to use the Polish Eagle as a coat of arms to represent the whole of Poland in 1295.

The Margraviate of Moravia from at least the 1270s used a chequered eagle. The Moravian Eagle (without chequering) was first documented on the seal of Ottokar's uncle, Margrave Přemysl (d. 1239) and is thus likely derived from the coat of arms of the Přemyslid dynasty, who in the early 13th century used a "flaming eagle" coat of arms alongside the Bohemian lion for the Kingdom of Bohemia.

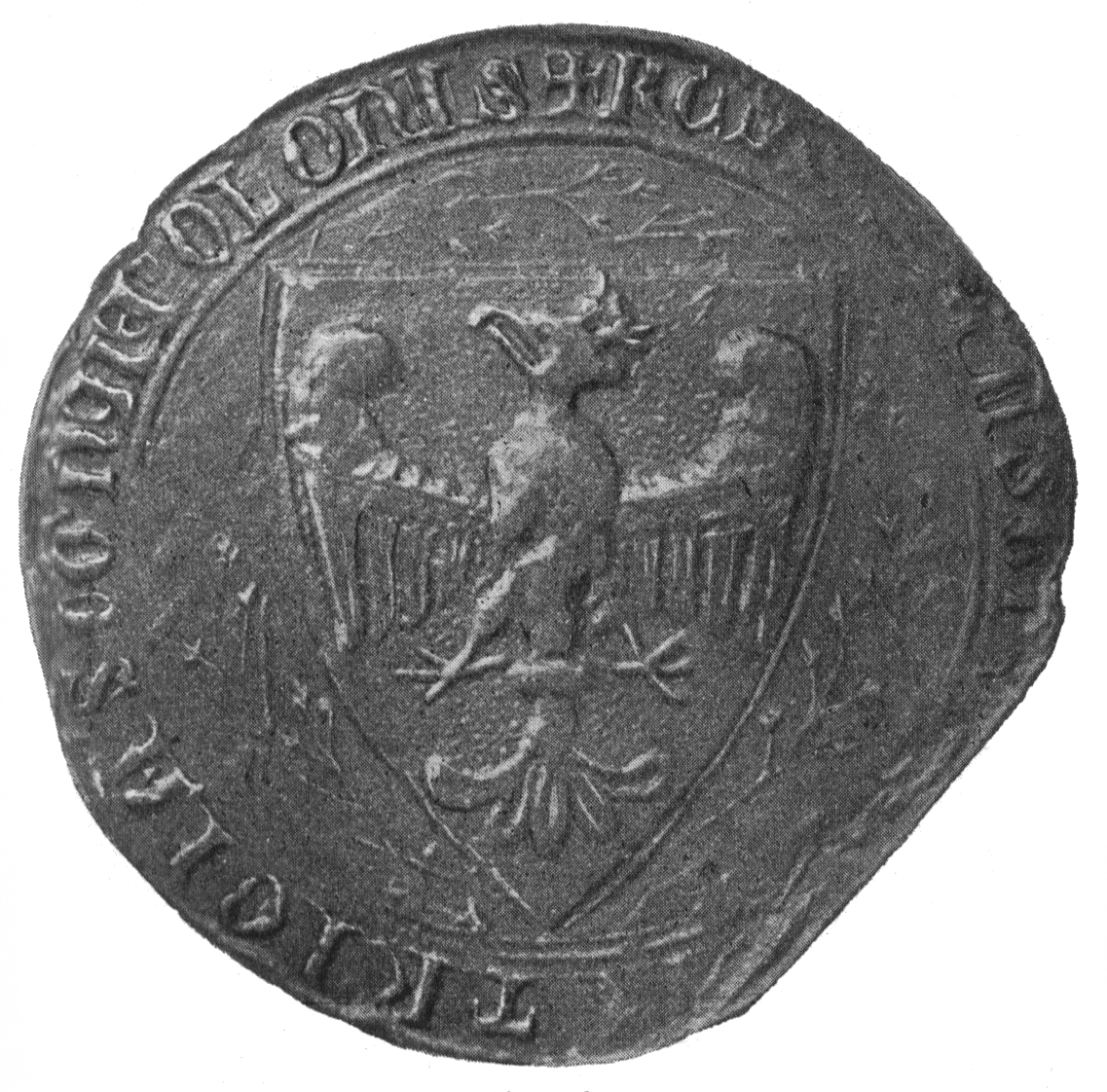
Seal of Przemysł II (1295)

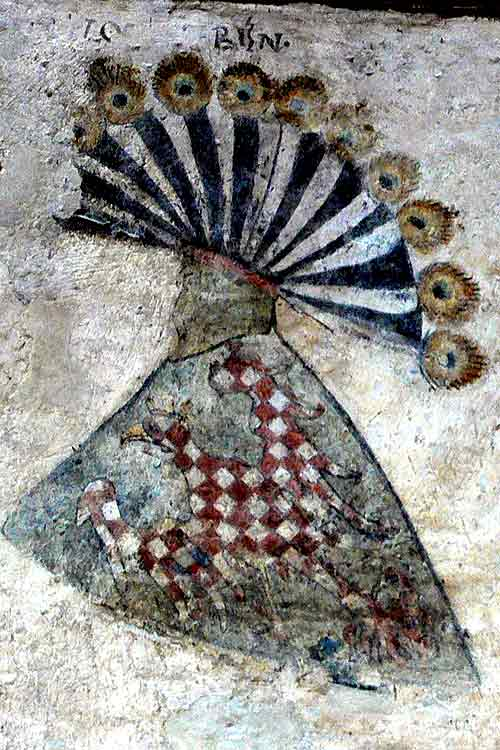
Moravian eagle, fresco in the castle Gozzoburg in Krems (c. 1270)

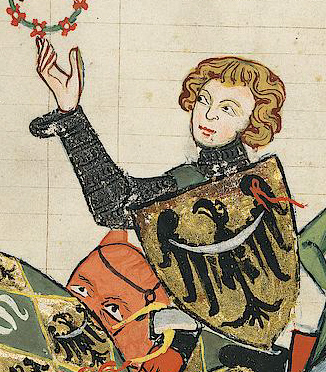
Henry IV Probus, Duke of Silesia with the Silesian eagle in Codex Manesse (c. 1305–1340)

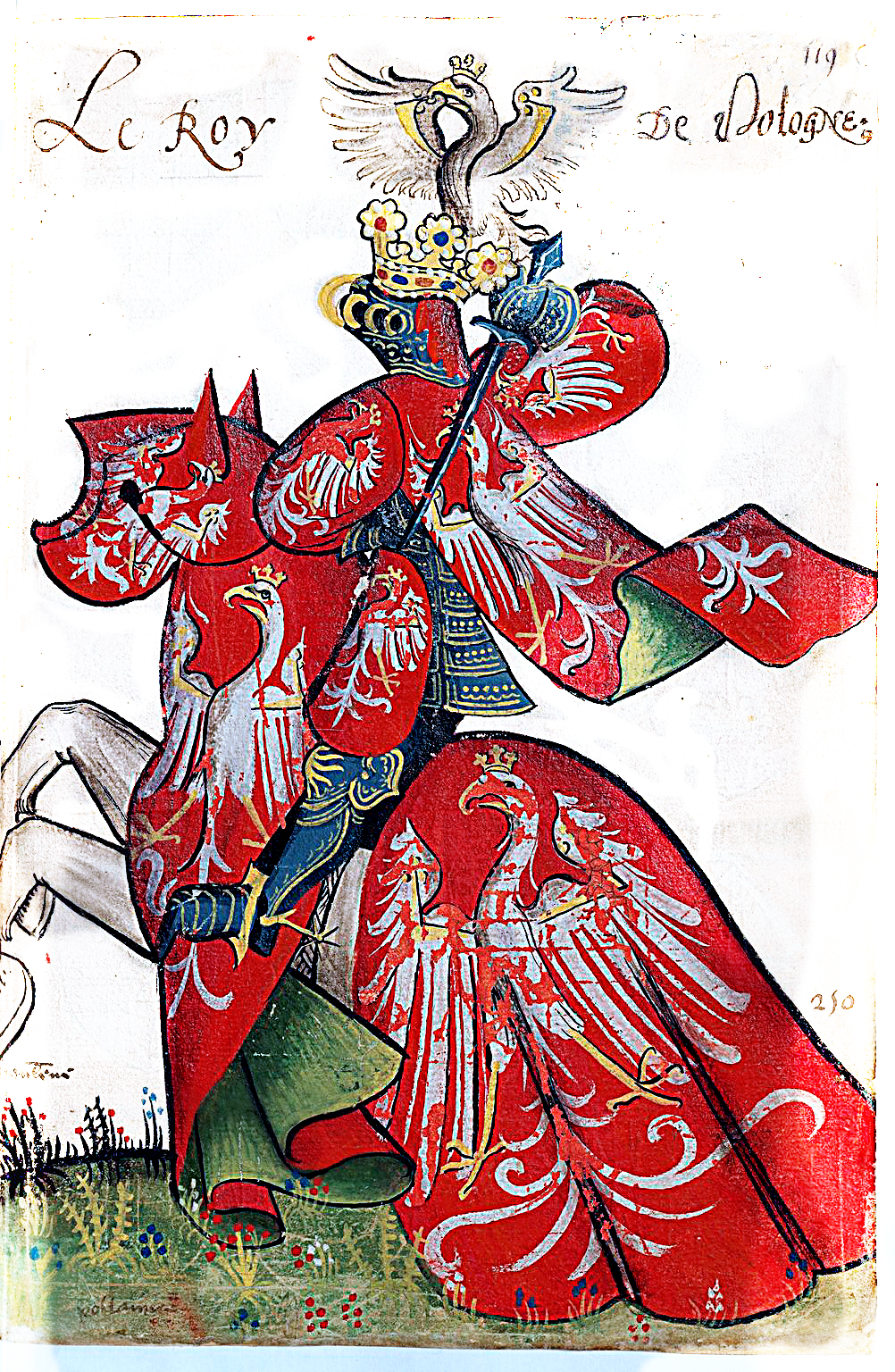
Coat of arms of the King of Poland, after the Grand Armorial équestre de la Toison d'or (c. 1430–1461).

== Modern usage ==
=== Heraldic eagles ===
Moravian eagle

Silesian eagle

Heraldic eagles are enduring symbols used in the national coats of arms of a number of countries:

- Albania: Principality of Albania (1914), House of Kastrioti coat of arms
- Armenia: Quarterly, eagles for the Artaxiad and Arsacid dynasties (adopted 1992).
- Austria: Reichsadler (1919).
- Bogotá: was granted by the Emperor Charles V to the New Kingdom of Granada on 3 December 1548.
- Czech Republic: Quartered, Moravian and Silesian eagles (Jiří Louda 1992)
- Germany: the German Bundesadler (since 1950), a direct continuation of the Reichsadler design used in the Weimar Republic from 1928.
- Liechtenstein: Coat of arms of Hans-Adam II, Prince of Liechtenstein (b. 1945), with the Silesian eagle in the first quarter.
- Moldova: an eagle displayed holding an Orthodox cross in its beak, adopted 1990.
- Montenegro: Byzantine imperial eagle (2004).
- Poland: Piast dynasty, adopted 1990.
- Romania: Eagles for Wallachia and Transylvania, adopted 1992, revised 2016, partially based on the arms of Carol I of Romania (1881)
- Russia: Byzantine imperial eagle, adopted 1993, first adopted for Muscovy by Ivan III of Russia (1472).
- Serbia: Serbian eagle (Byzantine imperial eagle, Nemanjić dynasty).

=== Naturalistic eagles ===
==== United States ====
Great Seal of the United States

Since 20 June 1782, the United States has used its national bird, the bald eagle, on its Great Seal; the choice was intended to at once recall the Roman Republic and be uniquely American (the bald eagle being indigenous to North America). The representation of the American Eagle is thus a unique combination between a naturalistic depiction of the bird, and the traditional heraldic attitude of the "eagle displayed".

The American bald eagle has been a popular emblem throughout the life of the republic, with an eagle appearing in its current form since 1885, in the flags and seals of the President, Navy, Marine Corps, Air Force, Justice Department, Defense Department, Postal Service, and other organizations, on various coins (such as the quarter-dollar), and in various American corporate logos past and present, such as those of Case and American Eagle Outfitters.

Benjamin Franklin is quoted in a letter to his daughter regretting the eagle's use as a national symbol, calling it a "bird of bad moral character" that steals from other birds and is easily frightened, and joking that it is good that the eagle in the Cincinnati's proposed seal looked more like a turkey. This has led to a misconception that Franklin actively supported a turkey or opposed an eagle for the grand seal.

==== French Empire ====
Coat of arms of the First French Empire

The French Imperial Eagle or Aigle de drapeau (lit. "flag eagle") was a figure of an eagle on a staff carried into battle as a standard by the Grande Armée of Napoleon I during the Napoleonic Wars.

Although they were presented with Regimental Colours, the regiments of Napoleon I tended to carry at their head the Imperial Eagle. This was the bronze sculpture of an eagle weighing 1.85 kg (4 lb), mounted on top of the blue regimental flagpole. They were made from six separately cast pieces and, when assembled, measured 310 mm (12 in) in height and 255 mm (10 in) in width. On the base would be the regiment's number or, in the case of the Guard, Garde Impériale. The eagle bore the same significance to French Imperial regiments as the colours did to British regiments - to lose the eagle would bring shame to the regiment, who had pledged to defend it to the death.

Upon Napoleon's fall, the restored monarchy of Louis XVIII ordered all eagles to be destroyed and only a very small number escaped. When the former emperor returned to power in 1815 (known as the Hundred Days) he immediately had more eagles produced, although the quality did not match the originals. The workmanship was of a lesser quality and the main distinguishing changes had the new models with closed beaks and they were set in a more crouched posture.

Napoleon also used the French Imperial Eagle in the heraldry of the First Empire, as did his nephew Napoleon III during the Second Empire. An eagle remains in the arms of the House of Bonaparte and the current royal house of Sweden retains the French Imperial Eagle on its dynastic inescutcheon, as his founder, Jean Bernadotte, was a Marshal of France and Prince of Pontecorvo.

==== Other national emblems ====
Coat of Arms of Mexico featuring a Golden eagle

- The greater coat of arms of Belgium (1837) includes a banner of the arms of Antwerp Province above the mantle, which depict both a double-headed eagle and a single-headed eagle.
- The coat of arms of Panama (1904) has an eagle rising with wings displayed and elevated on place of a crest. Since 2002 the eagle is officially specified as a harpy eagle.
- The coat of arms of Jordan (1921) featured an eagle before the development of the Eagle of Saladin emblem.
- The coat of arms of Iceland (1944) has an eagle or griffin (Gammur) among its supporters.
- The coat of arms of the Philippines (1946) includes the bald eagle of the United States.
- The national emblem of Indonesia (1950) has a Garuda (mythological bird) styled after the Javan hawk-eagle
- The coat of arms of Ghana (1957) has two tawny eagles as supporters.
- The coat of arms of Nigeria (1960)
- The emblem of Yemen (1962), readopted with changes following reunification in 1990.
- The coat of arms of Iraq (1965) features an eagle, and the emblem got modified several times. At the moment it represents the Eagle of Saladin.
- The coat of arms of Mexico (1968) shows a Mexican golden eagle devouring a rattle snake.
- The coat of arms of Namibia (1990) has an African fish eagle.
- The flag of Kazakhstan (1992) has a soaring steppe eagle.
- The coat of arms of South Sudan (2011) has an African fish eagle.
- The emblem of Syria (2025) features a stylized eagle, a departure from previous emblems which depicted the Hawk of Quraish.

=== Eagle of Saladin ===
Eagle of Saladin, as used by the United Arab Republic (1958-1971).

In Arab nationalism, with the Egyptian Revolution of 1952, the eagle became the symbol of revolutionary Egypt, and was subsequently adopted by several other Arab states (the United Arab Emirates, Iraq, Libya, the State of Palestine, and Yemen).

The eagle is commonly identified as Saladin's emblem because his yellow flag was adorned with an eagle, as well as the depiction of an Egyptian vulture on the west wall of the Cairo Citadel which was built during the rule of Saladin. The current design of the eagle itself, however, is of more recent date specifically after the Egyptian revolution of 1952.

As a heraldic symbol identified with Arab nationalism, the Eagle of Saladin was subsequently adopted as the coats of arms of Iraq and Palestine. It has previously been the coat of arms of Libya, but later replaced by the Hawk of Quraish. The Hawk of Quraish was itself abandoned after the Libyan Civil War. The Eagle of Saladin was part of the coat of arms of South Yemen prior to that country's unification with North Yemen.

=== Zimbabwe Bird ===
The stone-carved Zimbabwe Bird is the national emblem of Zimbabwe, appearing on the national flags and coats of arms of both Zimbabwe and Rhodesia (since 1924), as well as on banknotes and coins (first on Rhodesian pound and then Rhodesian dollar). It probably represents the bateleur eagle or the African fish eagle. The bird's design is derived from a number of soapstone sculptures found in the ruins of the ancient city of Great Zimbabwe.

== See also ==
- Double-headed eagle
- Triple-headed eagle
- Garuda (as a cultural and national symbol)
- Golden eagles in human culture
- Hawk of Quraish
- Lion (heraldry)

== Bibliography ==
- Clark, Hugh (1892) [1775]. Planché, J. R. (ed.). An Introduction to Heraldry (18th ed.). London: George Bell & Sons. ISBN 1-4325-3999-X. LCCN 26005078 – via Internet Archive.
- Fox-Davies, Arthur Charles (1909). A Complete Guide to Heraldry. New York: Dodge Publishing. ISBN 0-517-26643-1. LCCN 09023803 – via Internet Archive.
- Puttock, A.G. (1988). Heraldry in Australia. Frenchs Forest: Child & Associated Publishing.
- von Volborth, Carl-Alexander (1981). Heraldry: Customs, Rules and Styles. Poole, England: Blandford Press. ISBN 0-7137-0940-5. LCCN 81670212.
