= List of Polish flags =

Flag of the Republic of Poland

A variety of Polish flags are defined in current Polish national law, either through an act of parliament or a ministerial ordinance. Apart from the national flag, these are mostly military flags, used by one or all branches of the Polish Armed Forces, especially the Polish Navy. Other flags are flown by vessels of non-military uniformed services.

Most Polish flags feature white and red, the national colors of Poland. The national colors, officially adopted in 1831, are of heraldic origin and derive from the tinctures of the coats of arms of Poland and Lithuania. Additionally, some flags incorporate the white eagle of the Polish coat of arms, while other flags used by the Armed Forces incorporate military eagles, which are variants.

Both variants of the national flag of Poland were officially adopted in 1919, shortly after Poland re-emerged as an independent state in the aftermath of World War I in 1918. Many Polish flags were adopted within the following three years. The designs of most of these flags have been modified only to adjust to the changes in the official rendering of the national coat of arms. Major modifications included a change in the stylization of the eagle from Neoclassicist to Baroque in 1927 and the removal of the crown from the eagle's head during the Communist rule from 1944 to 1990 and replaced the traditional red colour by crimson red. Legal specification for the shades of the national colors has also changed with time. The shade of red was first legally specified as vermilion by a presidential decree of 13 December 1928. This verbal prescription was replaced with coordinates in the CIE 1976 color space by the Coat of Arms Act of 31 January 1980.

== National flags ==
The basic variant of the national flag is a plain white-and-red horizontal bicolor. A variant defaced with the coat of arms is restricted to official use abroad and at sea. Legal restrictions notwithstanding, the two variants are often treated as interchangeable in practice.

Image	Name	Design	Use
Flag of Poland	Flag of the Republic of Poland	Horizontal bicolor of white and red Proportion 5:8	National flag, inland ensign
Flag of Poland with coat of arms	Flag with coat of arms of the Republic of Poland	Horizontal bicolor of white and red defaced with the arms of Poland in the white stripe Proportion 5:8	Polish embassies, consulates etc.; civilian airplanes during international flights; civilian airports and airfields; sea harbours and ports authorities; civil and state ensign at sea

== Military flags ==
=== Rank flags used in all branches of the Armed Forces ===
Originally used only by the Navy, the use of these rank flags was extended in 2005 to all branches of the Armed Forces by an amendment to the relevant ministerial ordinance. They are flown to mark the presence and pay respect to the highest civilian and military authorities: the President of the Republic of Poland who is ex officio commander-in-chief of the Armed Forces; the Minister of National Defence who acts on the commander-in-chief's behalf in peacetime; Marshal of Poland, the highest rank in the Polish army (no living holders since 1989); and the Chief of the General Staff.

Image	Name	Design	Use
	Jack of the President of the Republic of Poland	Red flag emblazoned with the white eagle of the arms of Poland and bordered with a white wężyk generalski, an ornate wavy line used in the Polish military as a symbol of general's rank Proportion 5:6	On Navy vessels when the President is on board. On land when the President is present.
Flag of the Minister of National Defence	Flag of the Minister of National Defence	Swallow-tailed horizontal bicolor of white and red defaced in the white stripe with the arms of Poland and in the red stripe with a white anchor entwined with an S-shaped rope and a yellow cannon barrel in saltire Proportion 5:8	On Navy vessels when the Minister is on board. On land when the Minister is present.
Flag of the Marshal of Poland	Flag of a Marshal of Poland	Red flag with a double white border emblazoned with the Eagle of the Marshal of Poland holding two hetman's batons (buławy) in saltire Proportion 5:6	On Navy vessels when the Marshal is on board. On land when the Marshal is present.
Flag of the Chief of the General Staff of the Polish Armed Forces	Flag of the Chief of the General Staff of the Polish Armed Forces	Red flag with a double white border emblazoned with the Generals' Eagle; Proportion 5:6	On Navy vessels when the Chief of the General Staff is on board. On land when the Chief of the General Staff is present.

=== Navy ===
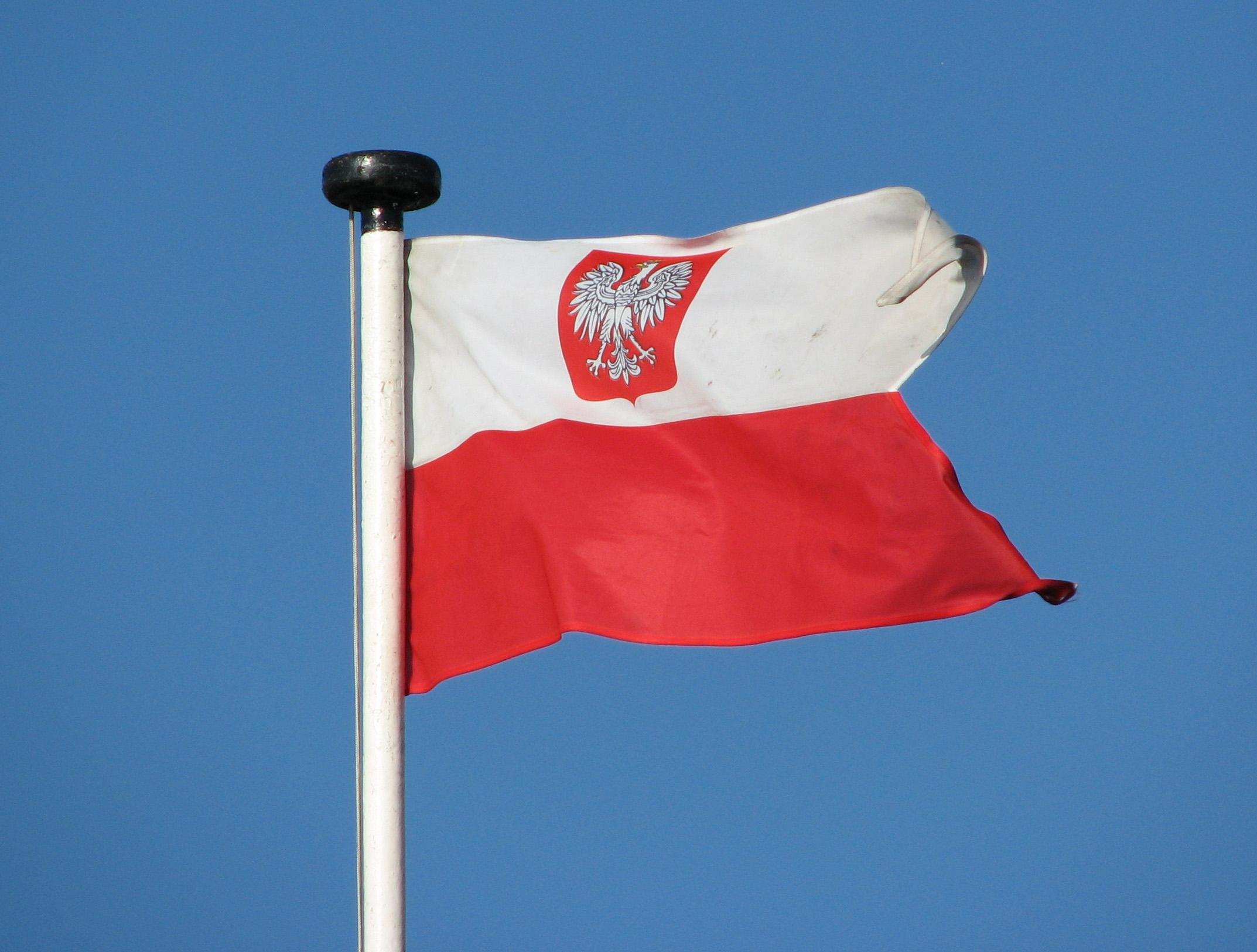
War ensign

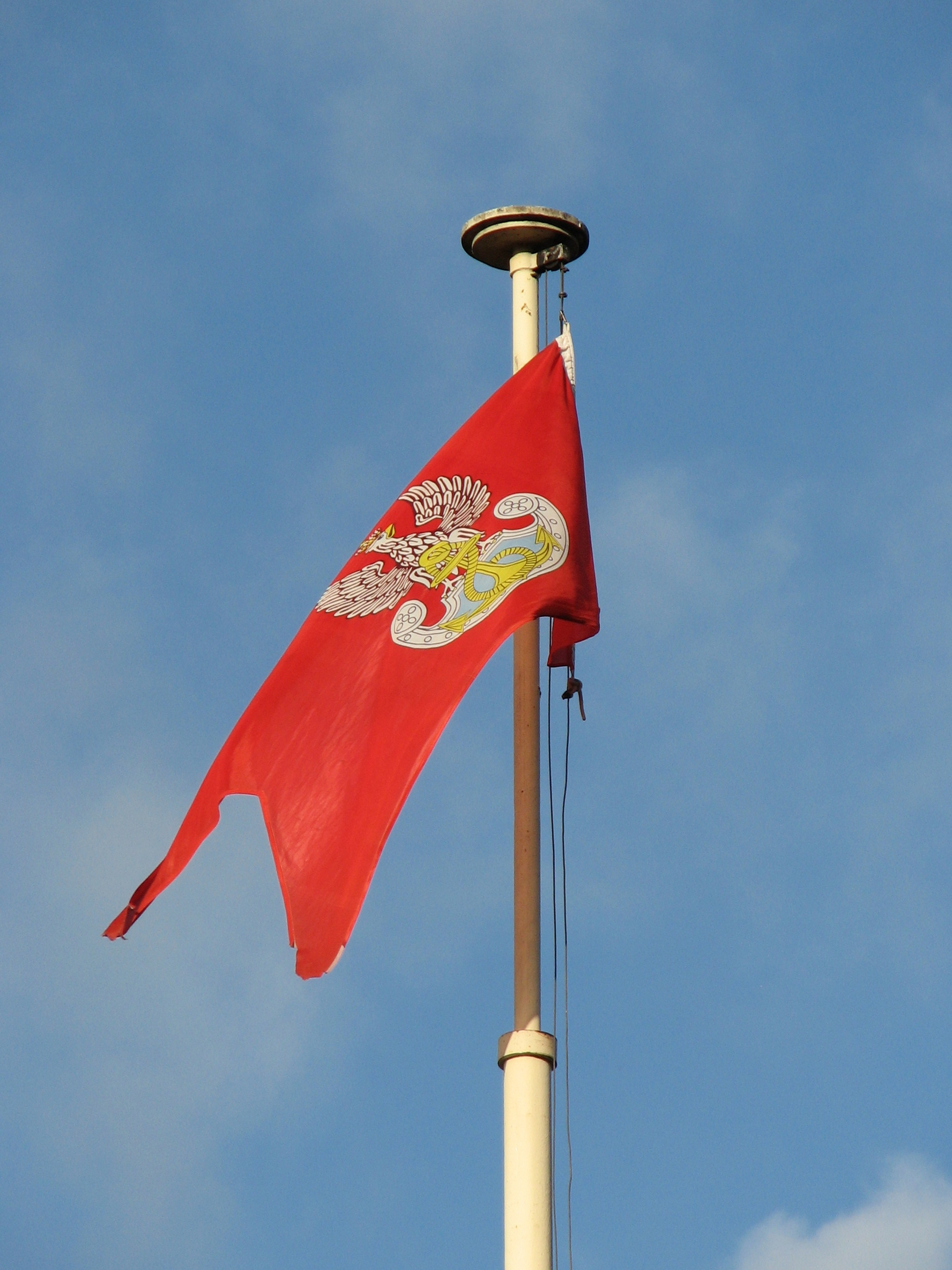
Navy flag

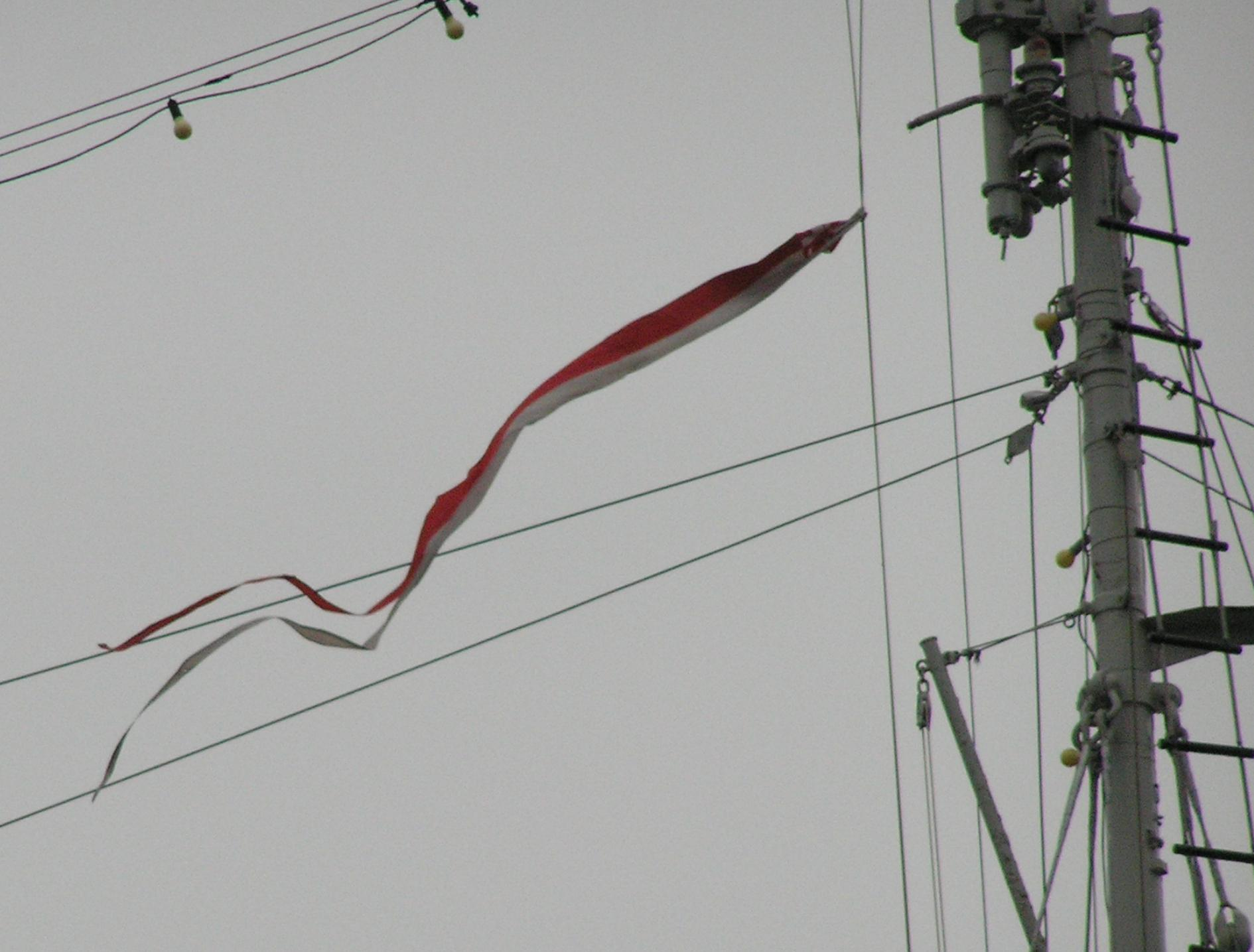
Commissioning pennant

The war ensign and the naval jack symbolize traditions of the Polish Navy dating back to Polish privateer fleet of the 15th–17th centuries. They are also symbols of a navy ship crew's courage, honor, unbreakable fighting spirit and readiness to defend Poland and its maritime rights. Naval Service Regulations define when, where and how the flags should be raised and lowered on board a navy ship.

Image	Name	Design	Use
Naval ensign of Poland	War ensign	Swallow-tailed horizontal bicolor of white and red defaced with the arms of Poland in the white stripe Proportion 10:21	Naval ensign
	Naval jack	Horizontal bicolor of white and red defaced with a cross pattée countercharged and, in the middle of the cross, with an arm brandishing a sabre (szabla) in a torteau (a red roundel); Proportion 4:5	Flown together with the war ensign on Sundays, holidays and other special occasions; flown everyday when in foreign waters
Navy flag	Navy flag Flaga Marynarki Wojennej	Swallow-tailed red flag emblazoned with the Navy Eagle; Proportion 10:21	Ceremonial flag used on military holidays, visits of high civilian or military authorities, or representatives of foreign countries, as well as other ceremonies. Flown together with flags of other branches of the Armed Forces during Polish Armed Forces Day (15 August) ceremonies at the Tomb of the Unknown Soldier in Warsaw.
Commissioning pennant	Commissioning pennant	Swallow-tailed bicolor of white and red defaced with a cross pattée countercharged near the hoist Proportion 1:25	Ship commanded by a navy officer in a campaign
Naval auxiliary ensign	Naval auxiliary ensign	Blue flag with an image of the naval ensign in the canton Proportion 3:5	Auxiliary naval vessels, such as patrol boats, tugboats, replenishment oilers, mine trawlers and degaussing stations, which are not allowed to fly the war ensign
Naval airport flag	Naval airport (heliport) flag	Horizontal bicolor of white and red defaced with the arms of Poland in the middle of the white stripe, the Air Force checkerboard in the white stripe between the coat of arms and the hoist, and a white anchor entwined with an S-shaped rope in the red stripe below the checkerboard Proportion 5:8	Naval airports and heliports

==== Rank flags ====
Image	Name	Design	Use
Flag of the Commander of the Navy	Flag of the Commander of the Navy	Swallow-tailed horizontal bicolor of white and red defaced with the arms of Poland in the white stripe and a white anchor entwined with an S-shaped rope in the red stripe Proportion 5:6	On naval vessels when the Commander of the Navy is on board
Admiral's Flag	Admiral's flag	Swallow-tailed horizontal bicolor of white and red defaced in the white stripe with the arms of Poland and in the red stripe with three white five-pointed stars arranged in an equilateral triangle one of whose sides is parallel to the hoist Proportion 5:6	On naval vessels when an admiral is on board
Vice Admiral's Flag	Vice admiral's flag	Swallow-tailed horizontal bicolor of white and red defaced in the white stripe with the arms of Poland and in the red stripe with two white five-pointed stars arranged in a line parallel to the hoist Proportion 5:6	On naval vessels when a vice admiral is on board
Rear Admiral's Flag	Rear admiral's flag	Swallow-tailed horizontal bicolor of white and red defaced with the arms of Poland in the white stripe and with a white five-pointed star near the hoist in the red stripe Proportion 5:6	On naval vessels when a rear admiral is on board
General's Flag	General's flag	Swallow-tailed horizontal bicolor of white and red defaced in the white stripe with the arms of Poland and in the red stripe with two yellow cannon barrels in saltire above a yellow cannonball Proportion 5:6	On naval vessels when a general is on board

==== Rank pennants ====
Image	Name	Design	Use
Pennant of the Chief of the Naval Staff	Pennant of the Chief of the Naval Staff	Pennant consisting of two horizontal stripes of white and red, and a red swallow-tail, defaced with the arms of Poland in the white stripe	On naval vessels when the Chief of the Naval Staff is on board
title=Flotilla Commander's Pennant	Flotilla commander's pennant	Pennant consisting of two horizontal stripes of white and red, and a white swallow-tail, defaced with the arms of Poland in the white stripe	On naval vessels when a flotilla commander is on board
Division Commander's Pennant	Division commander's pennant	Pennant consisting of two horizontal stripes of white and red, and a blue swallow-tail, defaced with the arms of Poland in the white stripe	On naval vessels when a division commander is on board
Group Commander's Pennant	Group commander's pennant	Pennant consisting of two horizontal stripes of white and red, and a green swallow-tail, defaced with the arms of Poland in the white stripe	On naval vessels when a group commander is on board

=== Air Force ===
Image	Name	Design	Use
Air Force Flag	Air Force flag Flaga Sił Powietrznych	Swallow-tailed red flag emblazoned with the Air Force Eagle; Proportion 10:21	Ceremonial flag used on military holidays, visits of high civilian or military authorities, or representatives of foreign countries, as well as other ceremonies. Flown together with flags of other branches of the Armed Forces during Polish Armed Forces Day (15 August) ceremonies at the Tomb of the Unknown Soldier in Warsaw.
Military airport flag	Military airport (heliport) flag Flaga lotnisk (lądowisk) wojskowych	Horizontal bicolor of white and red defaced with the arms of Poland in the middle of the white stripe and the Air Force checkerboard in the white stripe between the coat of arms and the hoist Proportion 5:8	Military airports and heliports
Air Force checkerboard	Air Force checkerboard	A square divided into four parts, in form of a checkerboard, with alternating white and red colours, and with outer linen of opposite colours Proportion 1:1	Military aircraft insignia

=== Other branches of the Armed Forces ===
Image	Name	Design	Use
Flag of the Land Forces	Flag of the Land Forces	Swallow-tailed red flag emblazoned with the Land Forces Eagle; Proportion 10:21	Ceremonial flag used on military holidays, visits of high civilian or military authorities, or representatives of foreign countries, as well as other ceremonies. Flown together with flags of other branches of the Armed Forces during Polish Armed Forces Day (15 August) ceremonies at the Tomb of the Unknown Soldier in Warsaw.
Flag of the Special Forces	Flag of the Special Forces	Swallow-tailed red flag emblazoned with the Special Forces Eagle; Proportion 10:21	Ceremonial flag used on military holidays, visits of high civilian or military authorities, or representatives of foreign countries, as well as other ceremonies. Flown together with flags of other branches of the Armed Forces during Polish Armed Forces Day (15 August) ceremonies at the Tomb of the Unknown Soldier in Warsaw.
Flag of the Territorial Defence Force	Flag of the Territorial Defence Force	Swallow-tailed red flag emblazoned with the Territorial Defence Force; Proportion 10:21	Ceremonial flag used on military holidays, visits of high civilian or military authorities, or representatives of foreign countries, as well as other ceremonies. Flown together with flags of other branches of the Armed Forces during Polish Armed Forces Day (15 August) ceremonies at the Tomb of the Unknown Soldier in Warsaw.

=== Flags of the commanders of the units of the Ministry of National Defence ===
Image	Name	Design	Use
	Flag of the commander of the Warsaw Garrison	A dark blue flag with the emblem of the Warsaw Garrison Command in the centre, in form a coat of arms of Warsaw with the olive branches around it, and two crosses sables below it. Proportion 5:6.	
Flag of the Commander in chief of the Military Gendarmerie	Flag of the Commander in chief of the Military Gendarmerie		

== Flags of other uniformed services ==
Image	English name Polish name	Design	Use
Flag of the Border Guard	Flag of the Border Guard; Flaga Straży Granicznej	Horizontal bicolor of white and red with a green border defaced with the arms of Poland in the white stripe Proportion 5:9	Vessels of the Border Guard
Police flag	Police flag Flaga Policji	Blue flag emblazoned with a badge used by waterborne Police units, i.e. a lifebelt and an anchor within a dark-blue diamond above a dark-blue ribbon with the word POLICJA written on it in white letters, all on a white eight-pointed star Proportion 5:9	Police vessels

== Naval flags ==
=== Special state service vessels ===
Special state service flags are used by state-employed civil special-purpose ships while on duty. These flags all follow the same basic design; a white flag with a horizontal stripe whose width is 1/5 of the flag's width. In the middle, each flag is emblazoned with the national coat of arms superimposed on a golden or yellow anchor whose height is 3/5 of the flag's width. The middle stripe is broken in the middle and does not touch the anchor or the arms. The type of special service performed by the ship is indicated by the color of the middle stripe.

Image	English name Polish name	Design	Use
Hydrographic vessel flag	Hydrographic survey and Maritime Office flag Flaga statku hydrograficznego i dozorczego urzędu morskiego	White flag emblazoned with the coat of arms of Poland placed on a golden anchor in the middle of a blue horizontal stripe Proportion 5:8	Hydrographic survey vessels and vessels of Maritime Offices
Lifeboat flag	Lifeboat and pollution control flag Flaga statku ratowniczego oraz specjalnego statku do zwalczania zanieczyszczeń	White flag emblazoned with the coat of arms of Poland placed on a golden anchor in the middle of an orange horizontal stripe Proportion 5:8	Lifeboats and pollution control vessels
Icebreaker flag	Icebreaker flag Flaga statku używanego wyłącznie do łamania lodów	White flag emblazoned with the coat of arms of Poland placed on a golden anchor in the middle of a violet horizontal stripe Proportion 5:8	Vessels used exclusively for breaking ice
Pilot boat flag	Pilot boat flag Flaga statku pilotowego	White flag emblazoned with the coat of arms of Poland placed on a golden anchor in the middle of an ash-grey horizontal stripe Proportion 5:8	Pilot boats
Fireboat flag	Fireboat flag Flaga statku pożarniczego	White flag emblazoned with the coat of arms of Poland placed on a golden anchor in the middle of a red horizontal stripe Proportion 5:8	Fireboats
Training ship flag	Training ship flag Flaga statku szkolnego	White flag emblazoned with the coat of arms of Poland placed on a golden anchor in the middle of a black horizontal stripe Proportion 5:8	Training ships
Customs ship flag	Customs ship flag Flaga statku celnego	White flag emblazoned with the coat of arms of Poland placed on a golden anchor in the middle of a green horizontal stripe Proportion 5:8	Customs ships
Hospital ship flag	Hospital ship flag Flaga statku sanitarnego	White flag emblazoned with the coat of arms of Poland placed on a golden anchor in the middle of a yellow horizontal stripe Proportion 5:8	Hospital ships
Telecommunication ship flag	Telecommunication ship flag Flaga statku telekomunikacyjnego	White flag emblazoned with the coat of arms of Poland placed on a golden anchor in the middle of a brown horizontal stripe Proportion 5:8	Telecommunication ships

== Subdivisions flags ==
=== Current voivodeship flags ===
State flag	Civil flag	Voivodeship	Year of adoption	Design
		Greater Poland Voivodeship (flag information)	2000	Trapezoid vertical bicolor of red and white emblazoned with the arms of the voivodeship in the red stripe
		Kuyavian-Pomeranian Voivodeship (flag information)	2000	Horizontal tricolor of red, white, and black (1:2:1)
		Lesser Poland Voivodeship (flag information)	1999	Horizontal tricolor of white, yellow, and red (2:1:2)
Lodz	Lodz	Łódź Voivodeship (flag information)	2002	Five vertical stripes of red and yellow
		Lower Silesian Voivodeship (flag information)	2009	Yellow emblazoned with a black eagle with a white crescent and a crosslet on its chest
		Lublin Voivodeship (flag information)	2004	Horizontal tricolor of white, red, and yellow (2:1:2) emblazoned with the arms of the voivodeship
	Lubuskie	Lubusz Voivodeship (flag information)	2000	Four horizontal stripes of yellow, white, red, and green (2:1:1:2) emblazoned with the arms of the voivodeship
		Masovian Voivodeship (flag information)	2006	Red emblazoned near the hoist with a white eagle with a golden beak and legs
		Opole Voivodeship (flag information)	2004	Horizontal bicolor of yellow and blue (2:1) emblazoned with the arms of the voivodeship in the yellow stripe near the hoist
		Podlaskie Voivodeship (flag information)	2002	Four horizontal stripes of white, red, yellow, and blue
		Pomeranian Voivodeship (flag information)	2002 (original introduction); 2010 (reintroduction)	Yellow emblazoned with a black griffin with a red tongue
	Silesia	Silesian Voivodeship (flag information)	2001	Horizontal triband of blue and yellow (2:1:2)
		Subcarpathian Voivodeship (flag information)	2000	Vertical triband of blue and white (1:2:1) emblazoned with the arms of the voivodeship in the white stripe
		Świętokrzyskie Voivodeship (flag information)	2013	Horizontal tricolor of blue, white, and red with a yellow stripe along the hoist, emblazoned with the arms of the voivodeship in the white stripe
		Warmian-Masurian Voivodeship (flag information)	2002	Trapezoid red flag bordered white, emblazoned with a white eagle's head in a golden crown and with a golden beak
		West Pomeranian Voivodeship (flag information)	2000	Vertical triband of white and red (a variant emblazoned with the arms of the voivodeship is also used)

=== Historical voivodeship flags ===
Flag	Voivodeship	Years	Design	Notes
	Zielona Góra Voivodeship	1985–1998	Horizontal bicolour of yellow and green	
	Łódź Voivodeship	1999–2000	Horizontal bicolour of yellow and red, with the coat of arms in the centre	Unofficial flag, used by the Łódź Voivodeship Sejmik from 1998 to 2000
	Lower Silesian Voivodeship	2001–2008	Horizontal bicolour of white and red, with a yellow coat of arms in centre, with black eagle with a white crescent and a crosslet on its chest	
	Świętokrzyskie Voivodeship	2001–2013	Horizontal blue, white, and red stripes to the right, and a yellow vertical stripe to the left, with coat of arms in the centre of the white stripe	
	Masovian Voivodeship	2005–2006	Red with a white eagle with a golden beak and legs in the centre	
	Lower Silesian Voivodeship	2008–2009	Yellow emblazoned with a black eagle with a white crescent and a crosslet on its chest	
	Pomeranian Voivodeship	2008–2010	Yellow emblazoned with a black griffin with a red tongue	

== Historical flags ==
Flag	Date	Use	Description
	1919–1927	Flag of the Second Polish Republic and the Polish People's Republic	
	1927–1980	Flag of the Second Polish Republic and the Polish People's Republic	
	1918–1919	Banner of the Greater Poland uprising (1918–1919)	There were many variants during the uprising but later this particular version became a dominant commemorating symbol.
Alternate Polish National Government Flag (January Uprising)	1863–1864	The vision of the flag of Polish National Government (January Uprising)	Coat of arms containing a white eagle, a knight on horseback and an archangel Michael. These elements are confirmed but have come in many variations, this flag is a modern interpretation.
	1830–1831	Banner of the Kingdom of Poland. (November Uprising)	The banner of the Kingdom of Poland from the Sejm hall, taken out after the November Uprising by Joachim Lelewel.
	1830–1831	Banner with the motto "For our freedom and yours" (obverse and reverse)	Khaki banner with a red cross and the motto, commonly used during the uprising in front of the insurgents' fortifications.
	1815–1830	Military ensign of Vistula Flotilla of Congress Poland	An ensign raised on the ships of the Polish Trade Company, sailing through the Black Sea to Mediterranean countries in 1784–1787. Restored by Tsar Alexander I in 1815 as the war ensign flag of the Congress Kingdom.
	1815–1830	Flag of the Russian Tsar as king of the Congress Kingdom in 1815–1830.	De facto flag. The state entity did not have an officially adopted flag.
	1794	Banner of 2nd Kraków Grenadier Regiment	One of banners used by Polish scythemen during Kościuszko Uprising. At the top there is motto of scythemen "Żywią y Bronią" (They Feed and Defend) which later became a Polish patriotic motto and the symbol of the Polish peasant movement.
	1733–1763; 1709–1733; 1697–1706	Banner of the Wettin kings	The state banner of August III from around the mid-18th century.
	c. 1606–1648	Banner of Vasa kings	Grand Standard Bearer of the Polish Crown (Chorąży Wielki Koronny), Sebastian Sobieski, at the wedding procession of King Sigismund III of Poland and Sweden, as painted anonymously on the Stockholm Roll (c. 1605).
	1587–1655	Banner of Vasa kings	Taken by the Swedish army in 1655.
	14th century–16th century	Banner of Kingdom of Poland	
Local
	1920–1939	Free City of Danzig	Flag of Gdańsk
	1920–1922	Central Lithuania	Flag of Central Lithuania
	1918–1920	Lemko Republic	
	1918–1919	Komańcza Republic	Flag of Ukraine
	1890–1918	Kingdom of Galicia and Lodomeria	Flag of Galicia and Lodomeria
	1849–1890	Kingdom of Galicia and Lodomeria	Flag of Galicia and Lodomeria
	1846–1918	Grand Duchy of Kraków	
	c. 1815–1848	Grand Duchy of Posen	
	19th century – 1849	Kingdom of Galicia and Lodomeria	Flag of Galicia and Lodomeria
	1815–1846	Free City of Cracow	
	1807–1814	Republic of Danzig	
	1226–1561	State of the Teutonic Order	
	1410	Pomerania-Stettin	
	1410	Prince-Bishopric of Warmia	
	1410	Duchy of Warsaw	
	1410	Duchy of Płock; Duchy of Rawa	
World War II resistance movement
	1942–1945	Unofficial flag of the Home Army and Polish Underground State	National flag with Kotwica (Anchor)
	1940–1945	Peasants' Battalions	
	1944	Combined Armed Forces of AL, PAL and KB^{pl}	Historically not certain as a flag, but confirmed as a brassard.
	1939–1945	Jewish Military Union	This flag was allegedly flying over Warsaw Ghetto during the uprising.
	after 1945	Jewish Combat Organization	There is no evidence of the existence of any ŻOB flag during World War II, the design presented here was created after the war among veterans.

== Political flags ==
Flag	Date	Party	Description
Current
	2014–present	Real Politics Union	The actual flag consists of a black (not dark blue) background and a blue cross in a white frame.
	2012–present	National Movement	
	2011–present	Congress of the New Right	
	2022–present	Mam Dość 2023	Logo with name partia.
	2001–present	platforma obywatelska	
	2010s–present	All-Polish Youth	Szczerbiec on green background.
	2001–present	Prawo i Sprawiedliwość	
	1990–present	Silesian Autonomy Movement	
	2007–present	Polska Partia Piratów	Flag also used in the Pirate Party Germany.
	1987–present	Polish Socialist Party	
	1980–present	Independent Self-Governing Trade Union "Solidarity"	Solidarity logo
	2021–present	Nowa lewica	
	2010–present (flag), 2003–present (party)	Zieloni	
	?–present	Polska 2050	logo poland 2050
	2015–present	Nowa nadzieja	logo
	2015–present	Partia razem	
	2016–present	Unia Europejskich Demokratów	
	1993–present 1930s–1940s	Falanga flag^{pl}, symbol of National-radicalism^{pl}	First used by National Radical Camp (ONR), then two successor organizations ONR-Falanga and ONR-ABC, ONR was reactivated in 1993 shortly after the fall of communism, currently, this flag is used by two more organizations called National Revival of Poland (NOP) and Falanga, which also use their own designs.
	2010s–present	National Revival of Poland	
	2019–present	Falanga (organisation)	
	?–2019	Falanga (organisation)	
	2005–present	Belarusian Christian Democracy	Old Flag of Belarus
Former
	1980	Gdańsk Shipyard protesters during the August 1980 strikes	The house flag of the Gdansk Shipyard, flown by the protesters during the August 1980 strike in Gdańsk Shipyard, and flown during the signing of the Gdańsk Agreement.
	2010s–2022	Xportal	
	1950s	Flag of the United People's Party section in Zębowice.	An example of a variation of the party flag.
	c. 1936	Sotsyalistishe Kinder Farband	
	1934–1940	German Union	German Union (Deutsche Vereinigung) was a Nazi German extreme right-wing political party founded in 1934 by members of the ethnic German minority residing in the Second Polish Republic. Their main symbol was rune Tiwaz.
	1920s	Banner of the Zblewo chapter of the National Party, before the introduction of the green and white flag, there were many local party flags.	
	1926–1931	Peasant Party	
	1920–1924	Union of Upper Silesians	Flag of Upper Silesia

== Organizational flags ==
Flag	Date	Use	Description
	1950–present	Polish Tourist and Sightseeing Society	

== Religious flags ==
Flag	Date	Use	Description
	?–present	Papal flag	Flags commonly used for Catholic ceremonies such as processions to decorate the area.
	1979–present	Mary flag	Flags commonly used for Catholic ceremonies such as processions to decorate the area.

== Ethnic flags ==
Flag	Date	Use	Description
	1918–present	Flag of Lemkos	The middle band can be represented as yellow, orange, or gold.
	?–present	Flag of Lemkos	Additionally contains the coat of arms of Transcarpathian Ruthenia
	1829–present	Flag of Masurians	
	?–present	Flag of Masurians	Additionally contains the coat of arms of Prussia, which is also coat of arms of Masuria
	1929–present	Flag of Kashubians	
	?–present	Flag of Kashubians	Banner of arms of Kashubia
	1882–present	Flag of Silesian German	Flag of Silesia and Lower Silesia
	1920–present	Flag of Silesians	Flag of Upper Silesia
	2010s–present	Flag of Lipka Tatars	A white flag with the tamga of the Golden Horde in canton.
	?–present	Flag of the Crimean Karaites	

== Regional flags ==
Flag	Date	Use	Description
	2022–present	Flag of Kociewie	The flag of Kociewie that won the competition. The blue symbol is a stylized cornflower.
	2016–present	Flag of Cieszyn Silesia	It is a standardized design created in 2016 based on the symbols of the Duchy of Teschen.
	1996–present	Flag of Western Pomerania	Sporadically used as the traditional flag of the region of Western Pomerania
	?–present	Flag of Dąbrowa Basin	Used by local organizations and authorities of Sosnowiec

== House flags ==
Flag	Date	Company	Description
	1938–1958	Baltic Shipping Company^{pl}	
		Gdansk Shipyard	
	1957–2004	Deep Sea Fishing and Fishing Services Company "Gryf"^{pl}	
	1970–1997	Polish-British Shipping Partnership (Polbrit)^{pl}	
	1927–1972	Polish-Scandinavian Transport Company JSC (Polskarob)^{pl}	
	1927–1950	Polish Shipping^{pl}	Used in cargo ships
	1926–1939	Polish Shipping^{pl}	Used in passenger ships
	1927–1940s	Polish River Shipping company "Vistula"	

== See also ==
- Flag terminology
- Mazurek Dąbrowskiego
