= List of Polish naval and maritime flags =

This is the list of naval and maritime flags of Poland.

== Jack ==
Flag	Date	Name	Note
	28.08.1919 – circa 1946	Jack (proporzec marynarki wojennej)	Formally it remained in force until 31.12.1955
	c. 1946 – 31.12.1955	Jack (proporzec marynarki wojennej)	Early People's Republic of Poland period. No precise date of introduction nor legal source can be found
	31.12.1955 – 28.12.1959	Jack (proporzec marynarki wojennej)	According to some sources, not used in practice
	28.12.1959 – 30.04.1993	Jack (proporzec marynarki wojennej)	People's Republic of Poland period. Basically the same as 1919–1946
	30.04.1993 – 26.03.2025	Jack (proporzec marynarki wojennej)	
	from 26.03.2025	Jack (proporzec marynarki wojennej)	Basically the same as 1919–1946

== Naval ensign ==
Flag	Date	Name	Note
	1919–1928	Naval ensign and land war flag (bandera wojenna i flaga wojenna lądowa)	Aspect 8:5
	1928 – c. 1946	Naval ensign (bandera wojenna)	Formally it remained in force until 31.12.1955, but apparently a flag with the crownless eagle was introduced after WWII. Aspect 10:21
	c. 1946 – 1993	Naval ensign (bandera wojenna)	People's Republic of Poland period. Formally from 31.12.1955. Aspect 10:21
	From 1993	Naval ensign (bandera wojenna)	Basically the same as 1928–1946. Aspect 10:21

== Ensigns of auxiliary vessels of the Navy ==
Flag	Date	Name	Note
	31.12.1955 – 14.03.1996	Ensign of auxiliary naval vessels (Bandera pomocniczych jednostek pływających)	Introduced in People's Republic of Poland period (the crownless eagle).
	From 14.03.1996	Ensign of auxiliary naval vessels (Bandera pomocniczych jednostek pływających)	

== Flags of ships of Border Guard ==
Flag	Date	Name	Note
	24.04.1953 – 19.11.1990	Ensign of vessels of the Border Defence Army (Bandera jednostek pływających Wojsk Ochrony Pogranicza)	In addition to People's Republic of Poland naval ensign
	from 03.03.1992	Flag of the Polish Border Guard (Flaga Straży Granicznej)	In addition to state ensign

== Ensigns of civilian ships ==
Flag	Date	Name	Note
	1783 – c. 1864	So-called Polish merchant ensign	Used on ships of Cherson Trade Company 1783–1793 and on Congress Poland's vessels on the Vistula in the first half of the 19th century, under Russian protectorate
	28.08.1919 – 29.03.1928	Merchant and foreign representatives ensign	Aspect 8:5
	29.03.1928 – c. 1946	Merchant ensign and state flag with a coat of arms	Aspect 8:5
	c. 1946 – 22.02.1990	Merchant and state ensign	Formally from 31.12.1955
	From 22.02.1990	Merchant and state ensign	The same as 1928–1946
	current	River craft ensign	At least from 29. 03. 1928
	1920–1930	State water administration flag	not in use

== Other Navy flags ==
Image	English name Polish name	Use
Commissioning pennant	Commissioning pennant Znak dowódcy okrętu	Ship commanded by a navy officer in a campaign Detailed description in List of Polish flags
Navy flag	Navy flag Flaga Marynarki Wojennej	Ceremonial flag used on military holidays, visits of high civilian or military authorities, or representatives of foreign countries, as well as other ceremonies. Detailed description in List of Polish flags
Naval airport flag	Naval aviation flag Flaga lotnictwa wojskowego Marynarki Wojennej	Naval airports and heliports, 28.12.1959 – 14.03.1996
Border defence naval airport flag	Flag of naval aviation of the Border Defence Army; Flaga lotnictwa morskiego Wojsk Ochrony Pogranicza	Naval airports and heliports, 28.12.1959 – 1991 (formally until 30.04.1993)
Naval airport flag	Naval airport (heliport) flag Flaga lotnisk (lądowisk) Marynarki Wojennej	Naval airports and heliports, from 14.03.1996; Detailed description in List of Polish flags
	Naval ensign of the river fleet (Flaga wojskowych statków żeglugi śródlądowej)	1930–1938
	Naval ensign of the river fleet (Flaga wojskowych statków żeglugi śródlądowej)	1938–1939

=== Rank flags used in all branches of the Armed Forces ===
Image	English name Polish name	Design	Use
Presidential jack	Jack of the President of the Republic of Poland; Proporzec Prezydenta Rzeczypospolitej Polskiej	Red flag emblazoned with the white eagle of the arms of Poland and bordered with a white wężyk generalski, an ornate wavy line used in the Polish military as a symbol of general's rank Proportion 5:6	On Navy vessels when the President is on board. On land when the President is present.
Flag of the Minister of National Defence	Flag of the Minister of National Defence; Flaga Ministra Obrony Narodowej	Swallow-tailed horizontal bicolor of white and red defaced in the white stripe with the arms of Poland and in the red stripe with a white anchor entwined with an S-shaped rope and a yellow cannon barrel in saltire Proportion 5:8	On Navy vessels when the Minister is on board. On land when the Minister is present.
Flag of the Marshal of Poland	Flag of the Marshal of Poland; Flaga Marszałka Polski	Red flag with a double white border emblazoned with the Eagle of the Marshal of Poland holding two hetman's batons (buławy) in saltire Proportion 5:6	On Navy vessels when the Marshal is on board. On land when the Marshal is present.
Flag of the Chief of the General Staff of the Polish Armed Forces	Flag of the Chief of the General Staff of the Polish Armed Forces; Flaga szefa Sztabu Generalnego Wojska Polskiego	Red flag with a double white border emblazoned with the Generals' Eagle; Proportion 5:6	On Navy vessels when the Chief of the General Staff is on board. On land when the Chief of the General Staff is present.

=== Rank flags ===
Image	English name Polish name	Use
Flag of the Commander of the Navy	Flag of the Commander of the Navy; Flaga dowódcy Marynarki Wojennej	On naval vessels when the Commander of the Navy is on board Detailed description in List of Polish flags
Admiral's flag	Admiral's flag Flaga admirała	On naval vessels when an admiral is on board
Admiral's flag	Admiral of the Fleet flag Flaga admirała floty	On naval vessels when an admiral is on board
Vice admiral's flag	Vice admiral's flag Flaga wiceadmirała	On naval vessels when a vice admiral is on board
Rear admiral's flag	Rear admiral's flag Flaga kontradmirała	On naval vessels when a rear admiral is on board
General's flag	General's flag Flaga generała	On naval vessels when a general is on board

=== Rank pennants ===
Image	English name Polish name	Use
Pennant of the Chief of the Naval Staff	Pennant of the Chief of the Naval Staff; Proporczyk szefa Sztabu Marynarki Wojennej	On naval vessels when the Chief of the Naval Staff is on board Detailed description in List of Polish flags
Flotilla Commander's Pennant	Flotilla Commander's Pennant; Proporczyk dowódcy flotylli	On naval vessels when a flotilla commander is on board
Division Commander's Pennant	Division Commander's Pennant; Proporczyk dowódcy dywizjonu	On naval vessels when a division commander is on board
Group Commander's Pennant	Group Commander's Pennant; Proporczyk dowódcy grupy	On naval vessels when a group commander is on board

== Special state service vessels ==
Image	Date	English name Polish name	Use
Police vessels flag	1996	Police flag Flaga Policji	Police vessels (from 2 May 1996)
Special state service flags (below) are used by state-employed civil special-purpose ships while on duty, from 16 December 2005. These flags all follow the same basic design; a white flag with a horizontal stripe 1/5 the width of the flag's width. In the middle, each flag is emblazoned with the national coat of arms superimposed on a golden or yellow anchor whose height is 3/5 of the flag's width. The middle stripe is broken in the middle and does not touch the anchor or the arms. The type of special service performed by the ship is indicated by the color of the middle stripe. Proportion 5:8. From 1967 there were basically similar flags carried, but with PRL coat of arms (eagle without a crown)
Hydrographic vessel flag	2005	Hydrographic survey and Maritime Office flag Flaga statku hydrograficznego i dozorczego urzędu morskiego	Hydrographic survey vessels and vessels of Maritime Offices (blue stripe)
Lifeboat flag	2005	Rescue ship and pollution-control flag Flaga statku ratowniczego oraz specjalnego statku do zwalczania zanieczyszczeń	Lifeboats and pollution-control vessels (orange stripe)
Icebreaker flag	2005	Icebreaker flag Flaga statku używanego wyłącznie do łamania lodów	Vessels used exclusively for breaking ice (violet stripe)
Pilot boat flag	2005	Pilot boat flag Flaga statku pilotowego	Pilot boats (ash-grey stripe)
Fireboat flag	2005	Fireboat flag Flaga statku pożarniczego	Fireboats (red stripe)
Training ship flag	2005	Training ship flag Flaga statku szkolnego	Training ships (black stripe)
Customs ship flag	2005	Customs ship flag Flaga statku celnego	Customs ships (green stripe)
Hospital ship flag	2005	Hospital ship flag Flaga statku sanitarnego	Hospital ships (yellow stripe)
Telecommunication ship flag	2005	Telecommunication ship flag Flaga statku telekomunikacyjnego	Telecommunication ships (brown stripe)
Telecommunication ship flag		Flag / ensign of the Maritime Search and Rescue Service Flaga / bandera / znak armatorski: Morska Służba Poszukiwania i Ratownictwa (MSPiR)	Flag of the service
Hydrographic vessel flag	1967	Hydrographic survey and Maritime Office flag Flaga statku hydrograficznego i dozorczego urzędu morskiego	Hydrographic survey vessels and vessels of Maritime Offices (blue stripe)
Lifeboat flag	1967	Rescue ship and pollution-control flag Flaga statku ratowniczego oraz specjalnego statku do zwalczania zanieczyszczeń	Lifeboats and pollution-control vessels (orange stripe)
Icebreaker flag	1967	Icebreaker flag Flaga statku używanego wyłącznie do łamania lodów	Vessels used exclusively for breaking ice (violet stripe)
Pilot boat flag	1967	Pilot boat flag Flaga statku pilotowego	Pilot boats (ash-grey stripe)
Fireboat flag	1967	Fireboat flag Flaga statku pożarniczego	Fireboats (red stripe)
Training ship flag	1967	Training ship flag Flaga statku szkolnego	Training ships (black stripe)
Customs ship flag	1967	Customs ship flag Flaga statku celnego	Customs ships (green stripe)
Hospital ship flag	1967	Hospital ship flag Flaga statku sanitarnego	Hospital ships (yellow stripe)

== Yachting ==
Flag	Date	Name	Note
	1956–1990	Polish Yachting Association	Ensign
	Since 1990	Polish Yachting Association	Ensign
	Since 1990	Polish Navy Yacht Club Kotwica	Ensign
	Since 1990	Yacht Club of Poland	Ensign

== See also ==
- List of Polish flags
- Mazurek Dąbrowskiego
