= Flag of Silesia and Lower Silesia =

Silesia and Lower Silesia
- Proportion: 2:3
- Design: A horizontal divided into white and yellow

The flag that serves as the symbol of the historical and geographical regions of the Silesia, and Lower Silesia, and as one of the symbols of the Silesian people, is divided horizontally into two stripes: white on the top and yellow on the bottom. It originated as the flag of the Province of Silesia, used from 1882 to 1919, that later used as the flag of the Province of Lower Silesia, from 1920 to 1935. Currently, the flag is recognized symbol of the Silesian people in the state of Saxony in Germany.

== History ==
The flag of the Duchy of Upper and Lower Silesia, used until 1918.

The Duchy of Upper and Lower Silesia, an autonomous region of Kingdom of Bohemia, within Austria-Hungary used a flag horizontally divided into two stripes, which were black on top, and yellow on the bottom. The colours came from the coat of arms of Lower Silesia, which features black eagle on a yellow background. It is unknown where the flag begun being used. The state itself existed from 1742 to 1918.

Flag of the Province of Silesia from 1882 to 1919, and the Province of Lower Silesia, from 1920 to 1935.

The Province of Silesia adopted its flag on 22 October 1882. It was rectangle divided horizontally into two stripes: white on top, and yellow on the bottom. Its colours had been adopted from the coat of arms of Lower Silesia. The aspect ratio of its height to its width was equal 2:3. In 1919, it was partitioned into the provinces of Lower Silesia, and Upper Silesia. In 1920, the Province of Lower Silesia had readopted the white and yellow flag. It was used until 1935, when Nazi Germany forbid its provinces from flying its flags, ordering them to replace them with the national flag.

== Usage in Saxony ==
The white and yellow flag is recognized as the symbol of Silesian people in the state of Saxony in Germany. The Paragraph 4 of Article 2 of the Constitution of the Free State of Saxony, guaranties the flag the equality alongside the flag of Saxony. Second, the flag is also employed by the Landsmannschaft Schlesien – Nieder- und Oberschlesien e. V. (Homeland Association of Silesia - Lower and Upper Silesia) a group representing the German expellees from Silesia and their decedents.

There are two designs used. It include the version divided horizontally into two stripes: white on top, and yellow on the bottom, and the version that additionally includes the coat of arms of Lower Silesia in the centre. The coat of arms depicts left-faced black eagle, with a white (silver) crescent put across its wings, with a white (silver) cross pattée on top of it, in its middle. It also has white (silver) eye. The eagle is placed within yellow escutcheon (shield). Both flags has their aspect ratio of height to width equal 2:3.

The flag of Lower Silesia, used in Saxony.

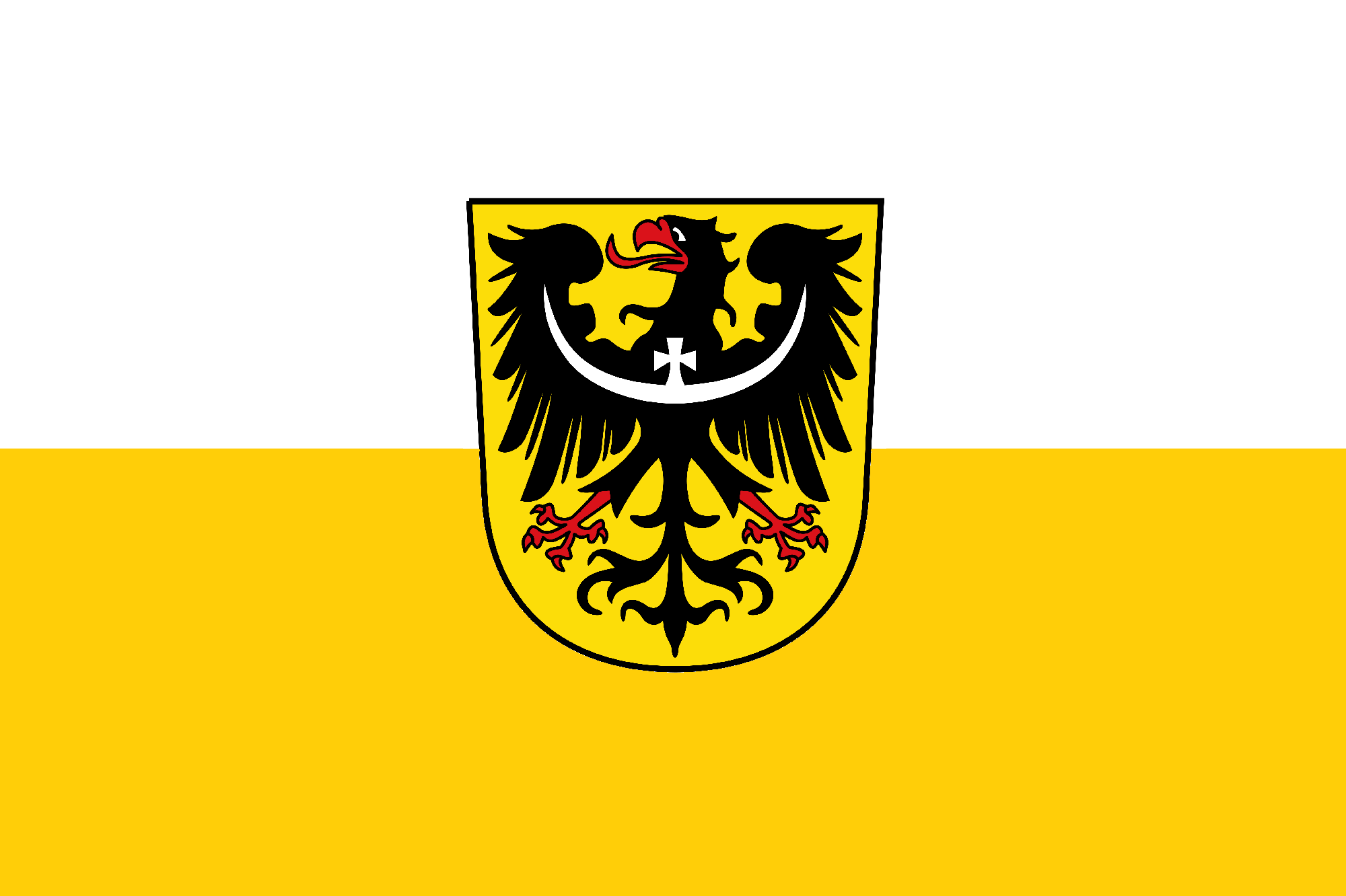
The variant version of the flag of Lower Silesia, used in Saxony, including the coat of arms of Lower Silesia.

The vertical version of the flag.

The vertical version of the flag.

== Usage in Poland ==
The current flag of the Lower Silesian Voivodeship is used since 2009.

The current flag of the Lower Silesian Voivodeship is used since 2009. It is a yellow (golden) rectangle with the aspect ratio of height to width of 5:8. In it centre is placed a left-faced black eagle, with a white (silver) crescent put across its wings, with a white (silvercross pattée on top of it, in its middle. It also has white (silver) eye. The eagle has an aspect ratio of its height equal 7/10 to the height of the flag, and 3/5 of its width to the width of the flag. The eagle had been adopted from the coat of arms of the voivodeship, which itself, was based on the coat of arms of Lower Silesia, originally introduced in 1224 by Henry II the Pious, duke of Silesia.

The flag of the Lower Silesian Voivodeship, used from 2008 to 2009.

From 2008, to 2009, the voivodeship used the flag with slightly different design of the eagle. Following the negative opinion of the Heraldic Commission, the voivodeship had modified the design of the eagle charge featured in the coat of arms and the flag, with the new design being approved on 23 July 2009, and officially established on 17 December 2009.

The flag of the Lower Silesian Voivodeship, used from 2001 to 2008.

The first flag of the voivodeship had been adopted on 30 March 2001, and used until 30 October 2008. The flag was a rectangle divided into two equally-sized horizontal stripes, white on the top, and red on the bottom, inspired by the red-and-white flag of Poland, with a coat of arms of the voivodeship in the centre, which depicted a left-faced eagle, with a white (silver) crescent put across its wings, with a white (silver) cross pattée, placed the yellow (golden) Iberian style escutcheon.

The design contradicted the convention followed by all other voivodeships of Poland, according to which, colours of the flag should have been based only on those present in the coat of arms of the voivodeship. As such, in January 2008, a commission was established to create a proposals for the new flag. In an internet vote, 3/4 of the participants did not like any of the proposed flags. In mid-October 2008, the discussion over the adoption of the new flag has been blocked. Following that, then voivodeship marshal Marek Łapiński, proposed a new design of the flag, which had been approved by the Regional Assembly on 30 October 2008, in the resolution no. XXXI/496/08.

== Usage in Czechia ==
Moravian-Silesian Region, Czechia has its own flag. The first quarter shows the eagle of (Lower) Silesia, which also appears in other Silesian arms and in the coat of arms of the Czech Republic. Thus, the design of the coat of arms of the Polish Voivodeship of Lower Silesia is very similar to the one in this flag.

== See also ==
- Flag of Upper Silesia
- Flag of the Silesian Voivodeship
