= Landesfarben =

State Colours of the Austro-Hungarian states, displayed on their flags.

The list of states, and their flag colors goes:

- Kingdom of Bohemia: red-white
- Lower Austria: blue-yellow
- Duchy of Bukovina: blue-red
- Upper Austria: white-red
- Kingdom of Croatia: red-white-blue
- Duchy of Salzburg: red-white
- Kingdom of Dalmatia: blue-yellow
- Austrian Silesia: yellow-black
- Kingdom of Galicia and Lodomeria: blue-red (to 1849), blue-red-yellow (1849-1890), red-white (1890-1918)
- Transylvania: blue-red-yellow
- Gorizia and Gradisca: white-red
- Kingdom of Slavonia: blue-white-green
- Margraviate of Istria: yellow-red-blue
- Duchy of Styria: green-white
- Duchy of Carinthia: red-white
- Imperial Free City of Trieste: red-white-red
- Duchy of Carniola: white-blue-red
- County of Tyrol: white-red
- Margraviate of Moravia: yellow-red
- Vorarlberg: red-white

== Literature ==
- Friedrich Heyer von Rosenfeld: "Die See-Flaggen, National und Provincial-Fahnen sowie Cocarden aller Laender : nach offiziellen Quellen zusammengestellt und bearbeitet", Verlag der kaiserlich-königlichen Hof- und Staatsdruckerei, Wien, 1883.
