= Flag of Saxony =

Free State of Saxony
- Landesflagge
- Use: Civil flag
- Proportion: 3:5 (or 1:2)
- Adopted: 1920, 1947, 1991
- Design: A bicolor of white over green.
- Landesdienstflagge
- Use: State flag
- Proportion: 3:5 (or 1:2)
- Adopted: 1991
- Design: The civil flag with the addition of the coat of arms.

Both the civil and state flag of the German state of Saxony feature a bicolour of white over green, similar to the Austrian province of Styria although they are historically not related to each other. The state flag is similar to the civil flag, except it is defaced in the centre with the coat of arms of Saxony. The colours of both flags were officially decided as state colours in 1815 in the Kingdom of Saxony. The aristocracy used mostly and in first time the quadrangular version and later the rectangular.

== Design ==
The civil bicolour flag of white over green was used before World War II, and formally abolished in 1935, under the reforms of the Third Reich. It was readopted 1945 when Saxony became a state again, and abolished 1952 under governing reforms of the German Democratic Republic. When Germany was reunited, Saxony became a state again, and so the flag was finally officially readopted in 1991, having been a much used symbol during the demonstrations in the German Democratic Republic in 1989/90.

=== Colors ===
The Constitution of the Free State of Saxony defines the "state colors" as simply "white and green", with no further specifications. On 2 June 1999, the federal cabinet introduced a corporate design for the German government which defined "green" as RGB 0,133,74 or PANTONE® 7731, but it is unclear if these guidelines apply to the states, and in any case, in practice the specific shades can vary wildly, especially in unofficial uses.

| Colour scheme | Green |
|---|---|
| CMYK | 100.0.100.20 |
| CMYK | 85.0.100.0 (Note: For newspapers.) |
| Pantone (approximation) | 7731 |
| Decimal RGB | 0,133,74 |

== History ==
Flag of Saxony before 1815

The house colours of the old Saxon or Margraviate ruling family of the Wettins were originally yellow and blue. The colours can also be found in the motif of the Landsberg pale as the coat of arms of the Margraviate of Landsberg, the ancestral land of the Wettins. It has found its way into many coats of arms of cities of modern-day Saxony (i.e. Leipzig, Chemnitz, Delitzsch). Since the middle of the 13th century, the black Meissen lion on a golden background has prevailed as a Wettin symbol of power. Flags in today's sense did not exist at that time, if at all, the coat of arms was used as a so-called coat of arms banner.

With the attainment of the Saxon electoral dignity in 1423, the Saxon coat of arms replaced the Meissen lion as the primary symbol of power, often in combination with the electoral swords of the imperial racing flag to symbolize the office of archmarshal. The colours of the electoral flag of Saxony, which was primarily used until 1815, were derived from the Saxon coat of arms. The colours of the coat of arms also originated in Prussia (black and white) or Bavaria (white and blue). The bi- or tricolour colours usually found on flags today did not become established until the end of the 18th century, when the meaning of flags gradually changed from a pure symbol of the monarch to a distinctive sign of the state itself.

== Landtag of the Free State of Saxony ==
Landtag of the Free State of Saxony uses its own flag.

Flag of Landtag of Saxony.

== Minority flags ==
Paragraph 4 of Article 2 of the Constitution of the Free State of Saxony guarantees other flags equality alongside the Saxon state flag.

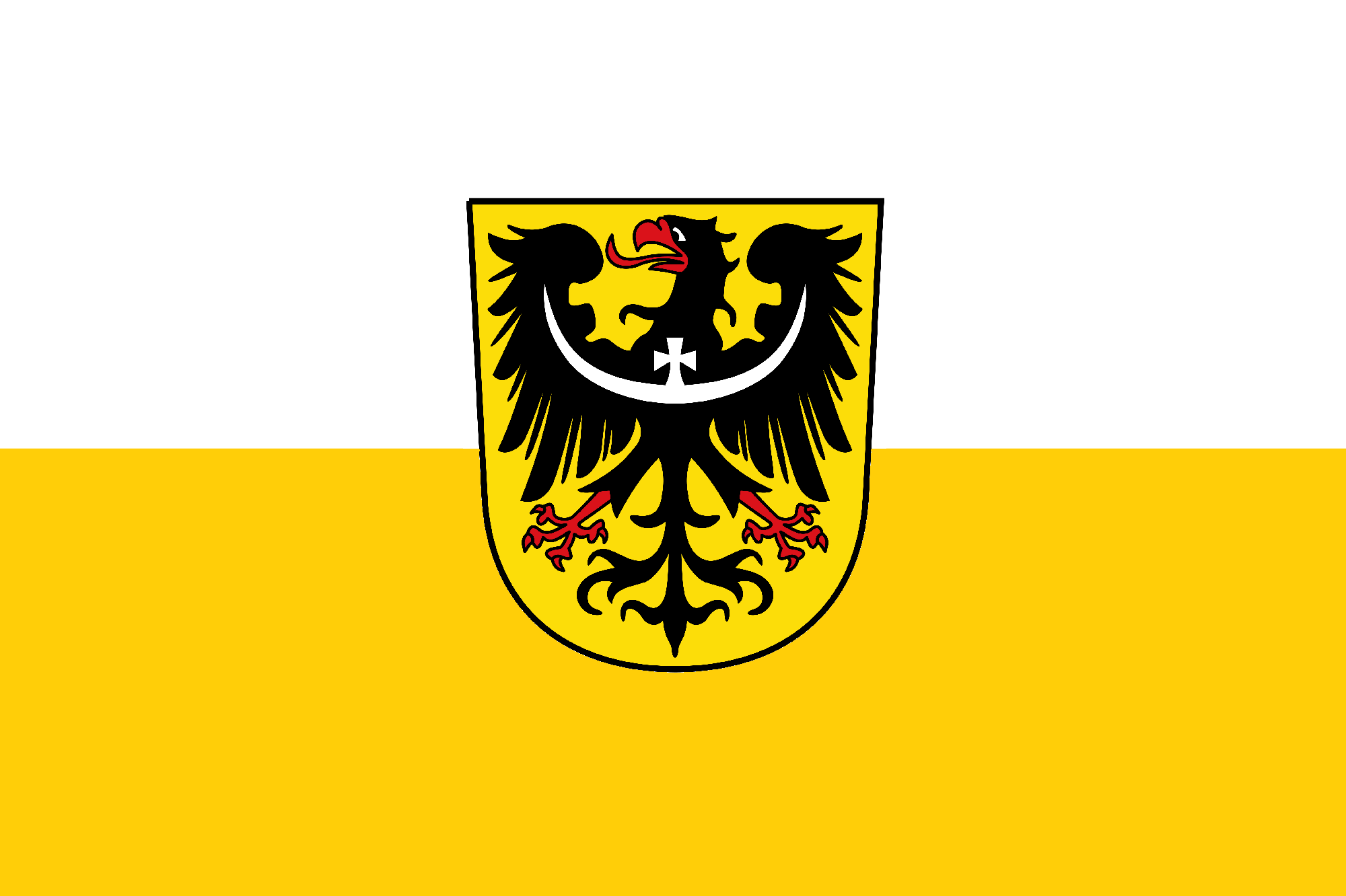
Flag of Silesians (with eagle)

Flag of Silesians

Flag of Sorbs

== Gallery ==
Previous versions
First Saxon flag of Old Saxony (700–785)

Saxon flag by the House of Ascania; associated for the Saxon Ostmark and battleflag for the Saxon Eastern March; crusades around 950

Royal standard of the House of Wettin

Ducal standard of Saxe-Coburg-Gotha (1826–1920), designed by Queen Victoria

Royal Standard of Prince Albert of Saxe-Coburg and Gotha as consort of Queen Victoria (1840–1861)

Saxe-Altenburg (1602–1672, 1826–1918, 1918–1920)

Saxe-Meiningen flag design during 1826–1918

Saxe-Weimar Banner of Duchess Anna Amalia of Saxe Weimar who was the patron of Goethe and Schiller

Electorate of Saxony (1356–1806)

The height of Saxony's power: Royal standard of the Saxon Kings of Poland-Lithuania (1697–1706; 1709–1763)

Without coat of arms (the flag of the Kingdom of Saxony, until 1815)

The flag of the Kingdom of Saxony (1815–1918), the Free State of Saxony (Weimar Republic (1918–1925), and reunified Germany (since 1991)

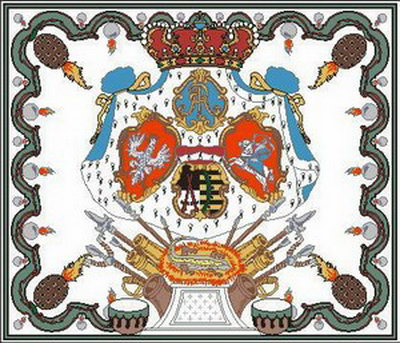
War flag with cannons, bombs, lances and one Fire Salamander, who can live in, eat and his drunken blood protects from fire (1697–1706; 1709–1763)

The banner of the Margraviate of Meissen for troops or princes (1806–1918)

Duchy of Saxe-Weimar-Eisenach (1809–1920)

Duchy of Saxe-Eisenach (1596–1638; 1640–1644; 1662–1809)

Saxe-Coburg and Gotha (1826–1911)

Saxe-Coburg and Gotha (1911–1920)

Saxe-Gotha-Altenburg (1680–1826)

Saxe-Hildburghausen (1680–1826)

Flag of Gau Saxony (1933–1945)

== See also ==
- Coat of arms of Saxony
