= Military eagle =

Polish Armed Forces insignia

Military eagles (Polish: orły wojskowe) are military insignia used in the Polish Armed Forces, based on the White Eagle of the Polish coat of arms. They are used on elements of military uniforms such as hats and buttons, as well as on military banners, flags, medals, emblems, publications etc. One variant exists for each of the five branches of the Armed Forces. Additionally, the Minister of National Defence, the Marshal of Poland, and generals and admirals use their own variants.

The Polish People's Army used similar emblems below but without the crown.

Image	English name Polish name	Design
Land Forces Eagle	Land Forces Eagle; Orzeł Wojsk Lądowych	White eagle with a golden beak and talons, crowned with a closed golden crown, its wings raised and its head turned to the right, perched on an Amazon shield
Navy Eagle	Navy Eagle; Orzeł Marynarki Wojennej	White eagle with a golden beak and talons, crowned with a closed golden crown, its wings raised and its head turned to the right, perched on a blue Amazon shield, placed on which is a golden anchor entwined with an S-shaped rope
Air Force Eagle	Air Force Eagle; Orzeł Lotnictwa Wojskowego	White eagle with a golden beak and talons, crowned with a closed golden crown, its wings raised and its head turned to the right, perched on an Amazon shield and surrounded by stylized hussar wings
Special Forces Eagle	Special Forces Eagle; Orzeł Wojsk Specjalnych	White eagle with a golden beak and talons, crowned with a closed golden crown, its wings raised and its head turned to the right, perched on a black Amazon shield
	Territorial Defence Force Eagle; Orzeł Wojsk Obrony Terytorialnej	White eagle with a golden beak and talons, crowned with a closed golden crown, its wings raised and its head turned to the right, perched on an Amazon shield, placed on which is the "PW" (for Polska Walcząca, "Poland Fights") anchor (kotwica)
Generals' Eagle	Generals' (Admirals') Eagle; Orzeł generałów (admirałów)	White eagle with a golden beak and talons, crowned with a closed golden crown, its wings raised and its head turned to the right
Eagle of the Marshal of Poland	Eagle of the Marshal of Poland; Orzeł Marszałka Polski	White eagle with a golden beak and talons, crowned with a closed golden crown, its wings raised and its head turned to the right, holding two crossed hetman's batons (buławy) with golden knobs
Eagle of the Ministry of National Defence	Eagle of the Ministry of National Defence; Orzeł Ministerstwa Obrony Narodowej	White eagle with a golden beak and talons, crowned with a closed golden crown, with its wings raised and its head turned to the right, surrounded by the circular inscription MINISTERSTWO OBRONY NARODOWEJ (Ministry of National Defence)

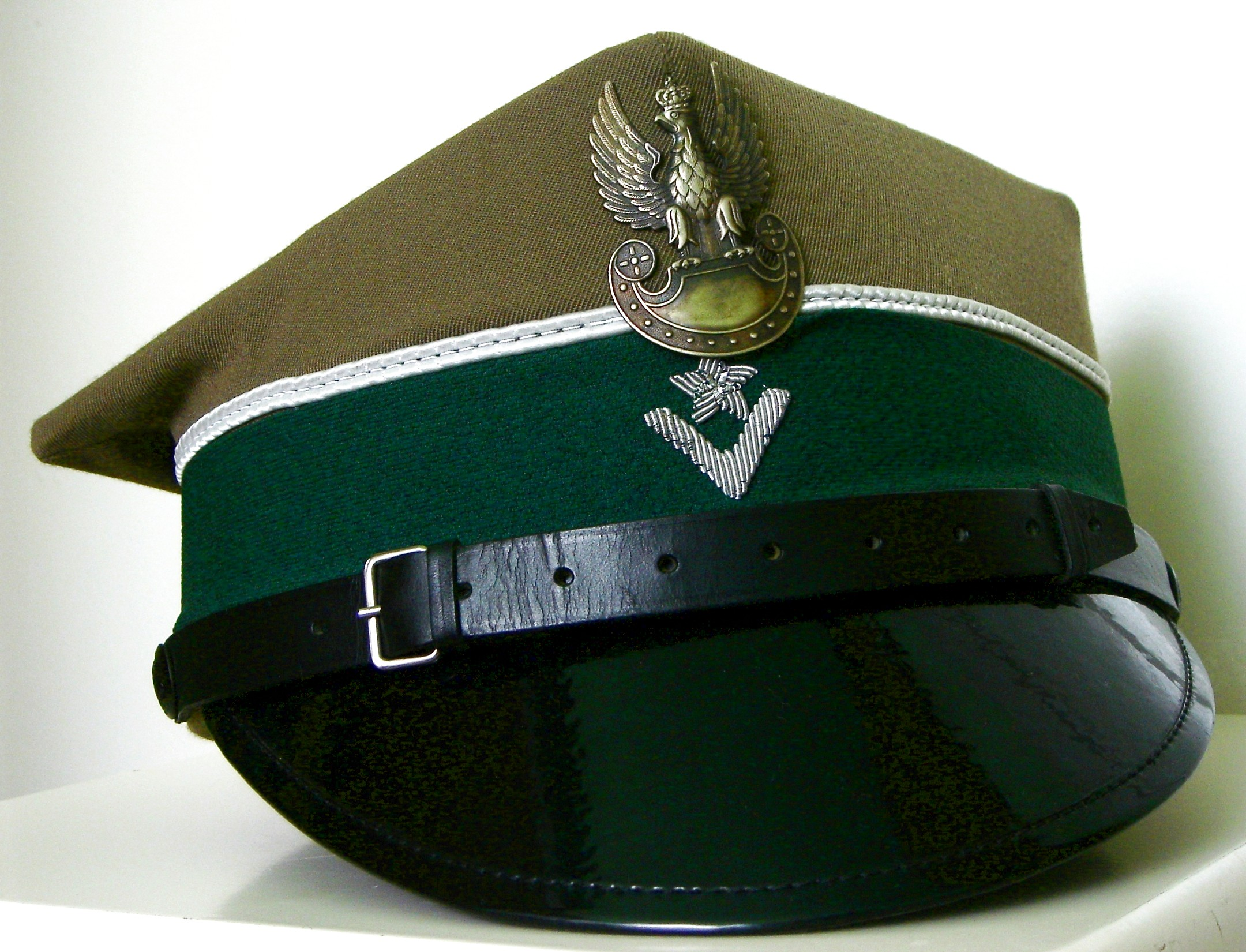
Officer's rogatywka cap

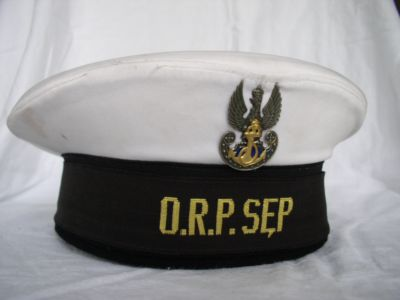
Cap of the Navy of Poland

== See also ==
- Order of the White Eagle
