= Naval ensign of Poland =

Naval Ensign

Naval ensign of Poland

An unofficial construction sheet of the naval ensign

The naval ensign (or war ensign) of the Republic of Poland (Polish: bandera wojenna Rzeczypospolitej Polskiej) is a swallowtailed horizontal bicolor of white and red with the national coat of arms in the middle of the white stripe. It has been used by the Polish Navy since 1919.

== See also ==
- List of Polish naval and maritime flags
