= Flag of Lower Silesian Voivodeship =

Flag of the Lower Silesian Voivodeship, Poland

Flag of the Lower Silesian Voivodeship
- Proportion: 5:8
- Adopted: 30 March 2001 (first flag); 17 December 2009 (current flag)
- Design: Yellow (golden) rectangle with the left-faced black eagle, with a white (silver) crescent-shaped przepaska put across its wings, with a white (silver) cross pattée on top of it, in its middle.

The flag of the Lower Silesian Voivodeship, Poland, is a yellow (golden) rectangle with the left-faced black eagle, with a white (silver) crescent-shaped przepaska put across its wings, with a white (silver) cross pattée on top of it, in its middle.

== Design ==
The current flag of the Lower Silesian Voivodeship has been used since 2009. It is a yellow (golden) rectangle with the aspect ratio of height to width of 5:8. In its centre there is a left-faced black eagle, with a white (silver) crescent-shaped przepaska put across its wings, with a white (silver) cross pattée on top of it, in its middle. It also has a white (silver) eye. The eagle has an aspect ratio of its height equal 7/10 to the height of the flag, and 3/5 of its width to the width of the flag. The eagle had been adopted from the coat of arms of the voivodeship, which itself, was based on the coat of arms of Lower Silesia, originally introduced in 1224 by Henry II the Pious, duke of Silesia.

== History ==
Flag of the Province of Silesia from 1882 to 1919, and the Province of Lower Silesia, from 1920 to 1935.

The Province of Silesia, which was partially located within the modern borders of the Lower Silesian Voivodeship, adopted its flag on 22 October 1882. It was a rectangle divided horizontally into two stripes: white on top, and yellow on the bottom. Its colours had been adopted from the coat of arms of Lower Silesia. The aspect ratio of its height to its width was equal to 2:3. In 1919, it was partitioned into the provinces of Lower Silesia, and Upper Silesia. In 1920, the province of Lower Silesia had readopted the white-yellow flag. It was used until 1935, when Nazi Germany forbid its provinces from flying its flags, ordering them to replace them with the national flag.

The flag of the Lower Silesian Voivodeship, used from 2001 to 2008.

The first flag of the voivodeship had been adopted on 30 March 2001, and used until 30 October 2008. The flag was a rectangle divided into two equally-sized horizontal stripes, white on the top, and red on the bottom, inspired by the red-and-white flag of Poland, with a coat of arms of the voivodeship in the centre, which depicted a left-faced eagle, with a white (silver) crescent put across its wings, with a white (silver) cross pattée, placed the yellow (golden) Iberian style escutcheon.

The design contradicted the convention followed by all other voivodeships of Poland, according to which, colours of the flag should have been based only on those present in the coat of arms of the voivodeship. As such, in January 2008, a commission was established to create a proposals for the new flag. In an internet vote, 3/4 of the participants did not like any of the proposed flags. In mid-October 2008, the discussion over the adoption of the new flag has been blocked. Following that, then voivodeship marshal Marek Łapiński, proposed a new design of the flag, which had been approved by the Regional Assembly on 30 October 2008, in the resolution no. XXXI/496/08.

The flag of the Lower Silesian Voivodeship, used from 2008 to 2009.

From 2008, to 2009, the voivodeship used the flag with slightly different design of the eagle. Following the negative opinion of the Heraldic Commission, the voivodeship had modified the design of the eagle charge featured in the coat of arms and the flag, with the new design being approved on 23 July 2009, and officially established on 17 December 2009.

== See also ==
- Coat of arms of the Lower Silesian Voivodeship
- Flag of Silesia and Lower Silesia
