= Coat of arms of the Lower Silesian Voivodeship =

Polish coat of arms

- Armiger: Maciej Awiżeń, Voivode of the Lower Silesian Voivodeship
- Adopted: 17 December 2009 (current version); 25 February 2000 (first version)
- Shield: Yellow (silver) Iberian-style escutcheon
- Compartment: left-faced black eagle with a white (silver) crescent put across its chest and wings, with a white (silver) cross pattée on its top
- Use: Lower Silesian Voivodeship

The coat of arms of the Lower Silesian Voivodeship, Poland, features a black eagle with a white (silver) crescent put across its chest and wings, with a white (silver) cross pattée on its top, placed in a yellow escutcheon (shield). The first version of the coat of arms had been adopted in 2000, and current version, in 2009.

== Design ==
The coat of arms of the Lower Silesian Voivodeship consists of the yellow (golden) Iberian-style escutcheon (shield) with square top and rounded base. It features a left-faced black eagle, with a white (silver) crescent put across its chest and wings, with a white (silver) cross pattée on its top, in the centre of bird's chest. The eagle has a white (silver) eye, and raised wings.

== History ==
=== Background ===
The coat of arms of the Duchy of Silesia.

The design of the coat of arms had been for the first time used by Henry II the Pious, duke of Wrocław and Greater Poland, and the High Duke of Poland. It was present in his seal, that was used from 1224 to 1240. It depicted an eagle with a crescent put across its wings, with a cross pattée on top of it, in its middle, placed on a shield. Such design was inspired by the seal used by Henry the Bearded, his father.

Since then, the black eagle with a white (silver) crescent put across its wings, usually with a white (silver) cross pattée on top of it, placed in the yellow (golden) escutcheon (shield), had become the symbol of the Lower Silesia, including being the symbol of the Piast rulers of the Duchy of Silesia, and many of its successors.

=== Legnica Voivodeship ===
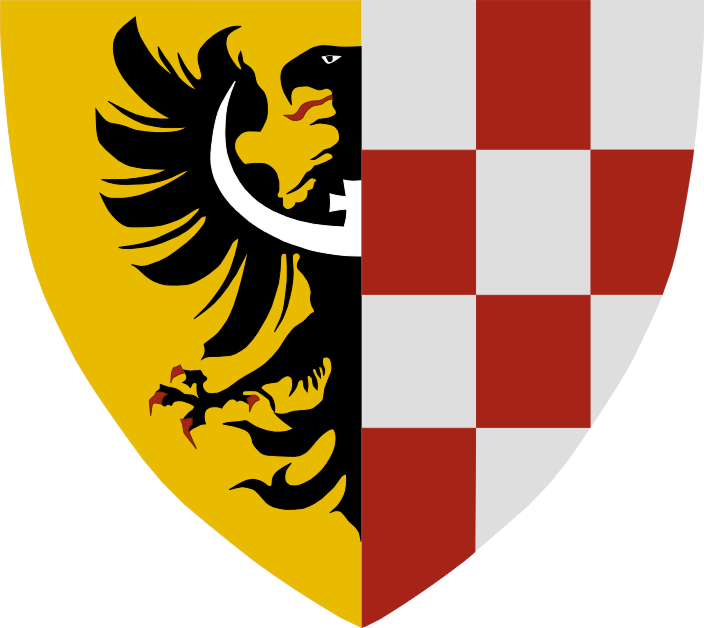
The coat of arms of the Legnica Voivodeship, used from 1997 to 1998.

Prior to establishment of the Lower Silesian Voivodeship, within its current borders, from 1975 to 1998, existed the Legnica Voivodeship.

Its coat of arms was established in 1997 and used until voivodeship disestablishment on 31 December 1998. It consisted of the wide Norman-style escutcheon, with square top and pointed bottom. It was divided vertically into two fields of equal size. The left field had a yellow (golden) background, and featured left half of a black eagle, from the coat of arms of Lower Silesia. It was on the coat of arms used by Louis II of Brieg, duke of Legnica and Brzeg, respectively from 1399, and 1413, until 1436. The eagle had a left half of a white (silver) crescent on its chest going alongside to the top of its raised left wing, with a left half of the white (silver) cross pattée placed on the top of the crescent, in the middle of the bird's chest. The left field featured a chequered pattern of eleven alternating white and red rectangles. The number of the rectangles referred to the eleven cities and towns in the voivodeship.

=== Lower Silesian Voivodeship ===
The first coat of arms of the Lower Silesian Voivodeship used from 2000 to 2009.

The Lower Silesian Voivodeship was established on 1 January 1999. Its first coat of arms had been adopted on 25 February 2000 by the Lower Silesian Voivodeship Sejmik. It consisted of the yellow (golden) Iberian-style escutcheon (shield) with square top and rounded base. It featured a left-faced black eagle, with a white (silver) crescent put across its wings, with a white (silver) cross pattée on its top, in the centre of bird's chest. The eagle had a white (silver) eye and raised wings.

Following the negative opinion of the Heraldic Commission, the voivodeship had modified and simplified the design of the eagle charge featured in the coat of arms, with the new design being approved on 23 July 2009, and officially established on 17 December 2009.

== See also ==
- Flag of the Lower Silesian Voivodeship
- Coat of arms of Silesia
