= Flag of the Silesian Voivodeship =

Polish regional flag

Silesian Voivodeship
- Proportion: 5:8
- Adopted: 11 June 2001
- Design: three horizontal stripes, that are from top to bottom: blue, yellow, and blue, with blue stripes being twice the size of the yellow middle stripe
- Designed by: Barbara Widłak
- Adopted: 11 June 2001
- Design: blue field with a yellow eagle in centre
- Designed by: Barbara Widłak

The civil flag of the Silesian Voivodeship, Poland is triband rectangle, divided into three horizontal stripes, that are from top to bottom: blue, yellow, and blue. The blue stripes are twice the size of the yellow middle stripe. The state flag is a blue rectangle with yellow eagle placed in its centre. It was designed by Barbara Widłak, and adopted on 11 June 2001.

== Design ==
The civil flag of the Silesian Voivodeship, Poland is a triband rectangle, with an aspect ratio of height to width of 5:8. It is divided into three stripes, that are from top to bottom: blue, yellow, and blue. The blue stripes are twice the size of the yellow middle stripe. Their proportion of the flag is 2/5 each, while the yellow stripe is 1/5.

The state flag of the voivodeship is a blue rectangle, with an aspect ratio of height to width of 5:8. In its centre is placed a yellow eagle, adopted from the coat of arms of the voivodeship.

The colours of the coat of arms and the flag refer to the coat of arms of Upper Silesia, historically used as a symbol of the dynasty of Silesian Piasts, who ruled in the duchies in the Upper Silesia. The coat of arms depicts a yellow eagle on the blue background, similar to the one in the voivodeship symbols.

Additionally, there are also vertical versions of both civil and state flags.

The colour scheme of the flags is officially defined as:

Colour model	Dark Blue	Gold
Pantone	Blue 2728	Yellow 116
RGB	(48,68,181)	(252,209,22)
CMYK	73.62.0.29	0.17.91.1
HTML	#FCD116	#3044B5

== History ==
The flag of the Duchy of Upper and Lower Silesia, used until 1918.

The Duchy of Upper and Lower Silesia, an autonomous region of Kingdom of Bohemia, within Austria-Hungary used a flag horizontally divided into two stripes, which were black on top, and yellow on the bottom. The colours came from the oat of arms of Lower Silesia, which features black eagle on a yellow background. It is unknown where the flag begun being used. The state itself existed from 1742 to 1918.

The flag of the Province of Upper Silesia, used from 1920 to 1935.

The Province of Upper Silesia of the Free State of Prussia, adopted its flag in 1920. It was rectangle divided horizontally into two stripes: yellow on top, and dark blue on the bottom. The aspect ratio of its height to its width was equal 2:3. Its colours had been based on the coat of arms of Upper Silesia. It was used until 1935, when Nazi Germany forbid its provinces from flying its flags, ordering them to replace them with the national flag.

The flag proposed by the Union of Upper Silesians in 1920.

On 23 April 1920, the Union of Upper Silesians, an independence movement for Upper Silesia, proposed a design for a flag of the potential Upper Silesian independent state. The flag would be divided horizontally into three stripes, that were, from top to bottom: black, white, and yellow. The movement operated until 1924.

The Silesian Voivodeship was established in 1999. Its flags were designed by Barbara Widłak, and adopted by the Silesian Regional Assembly on 11 June 2001. Since 2011, on 15 July, in the Silesian Voivodeship is celebrated the Day of the Silesian Flag.

== Gallery ==
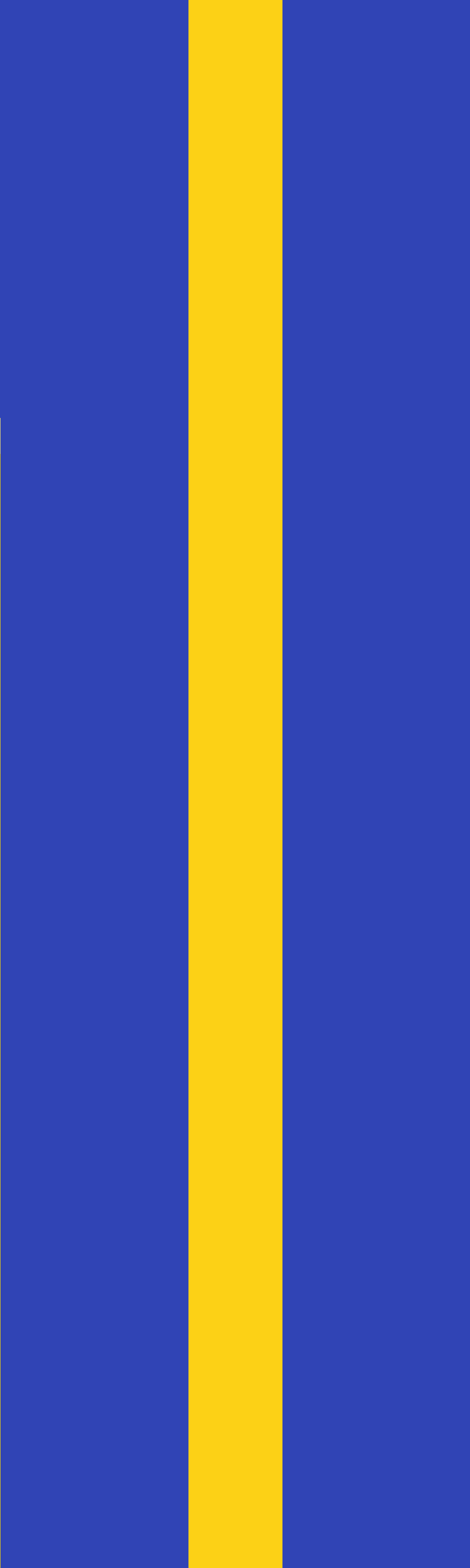
Vertical version of the civil flag.

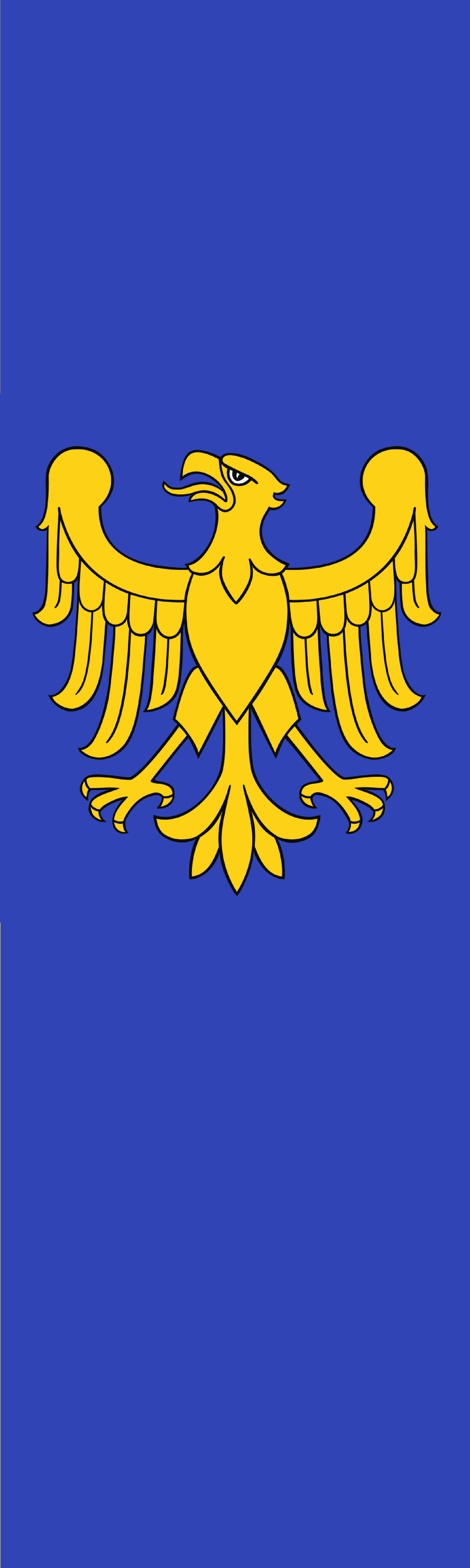
Vertical version of the state flag.

== See also ==
- Flag of Silesia and Lower Silesia
- Flag of Upper Silesia
- coat of arms of the Silesian Voivodeship
