= Rogatywka =

Four-sided peaked cap with a visor, part of various military uniforms of Poland

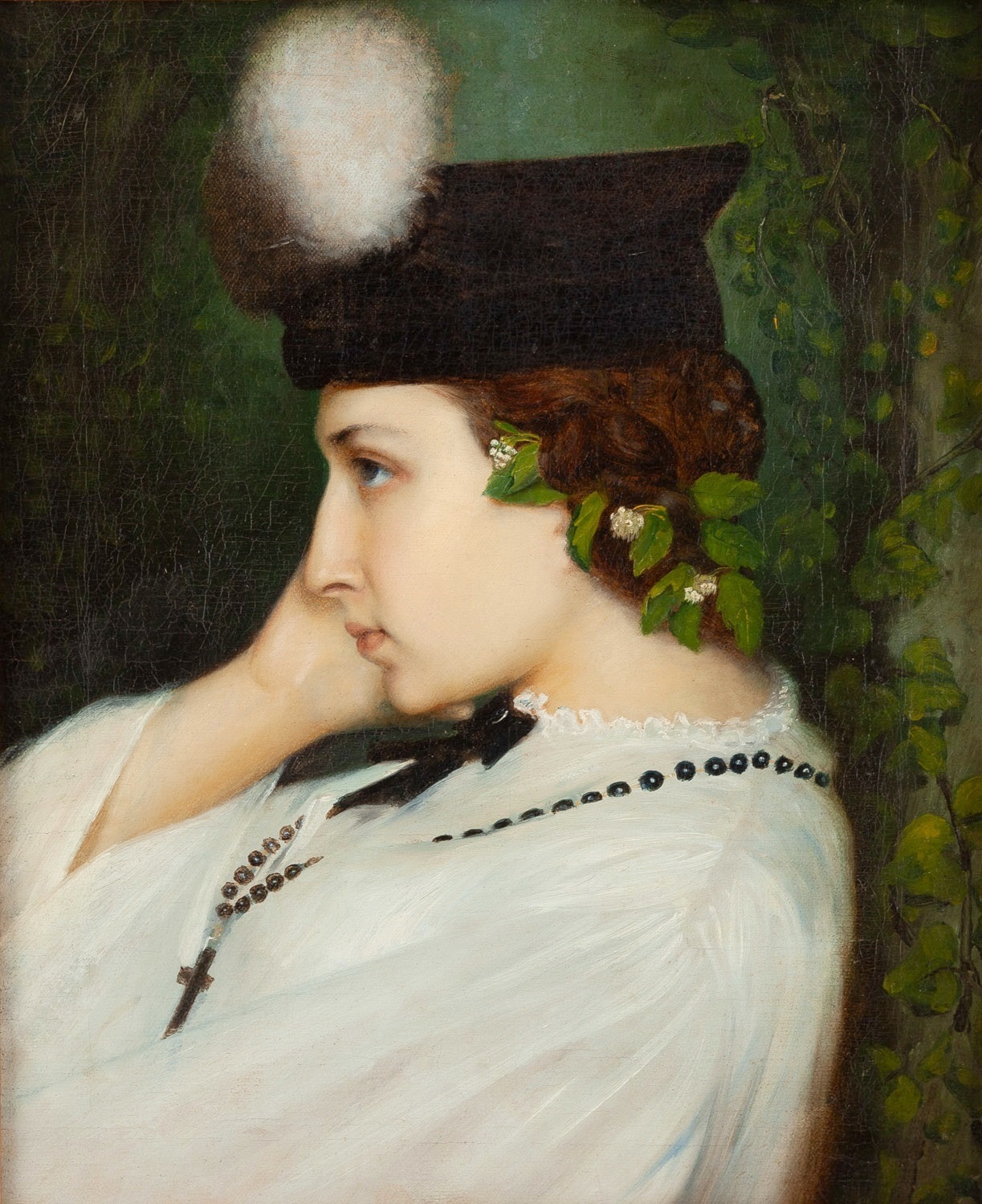
- Portrait of a woman wearing a rogatywka, c.1860s
- Type: Peaked cap
- Place of origin: Central Europe

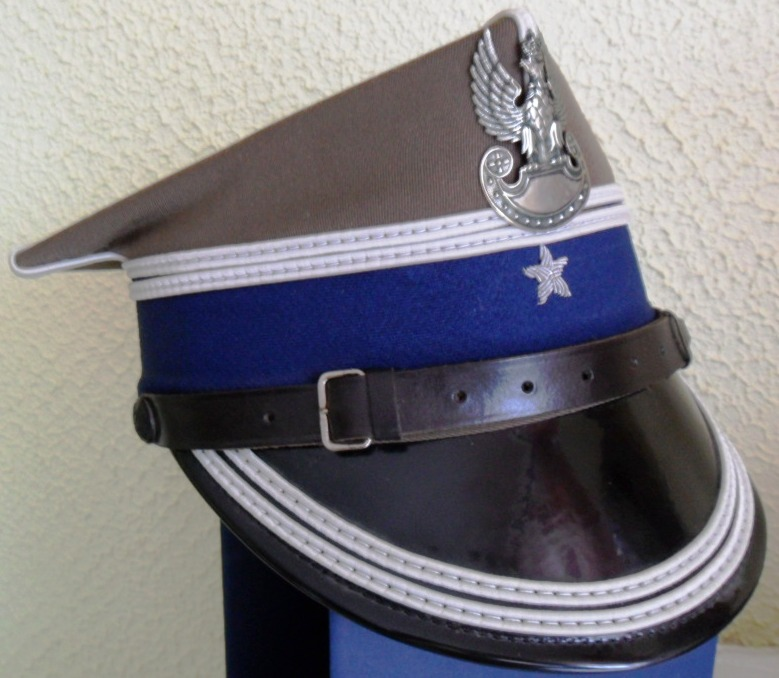
Rogatywka of the mechanized troops

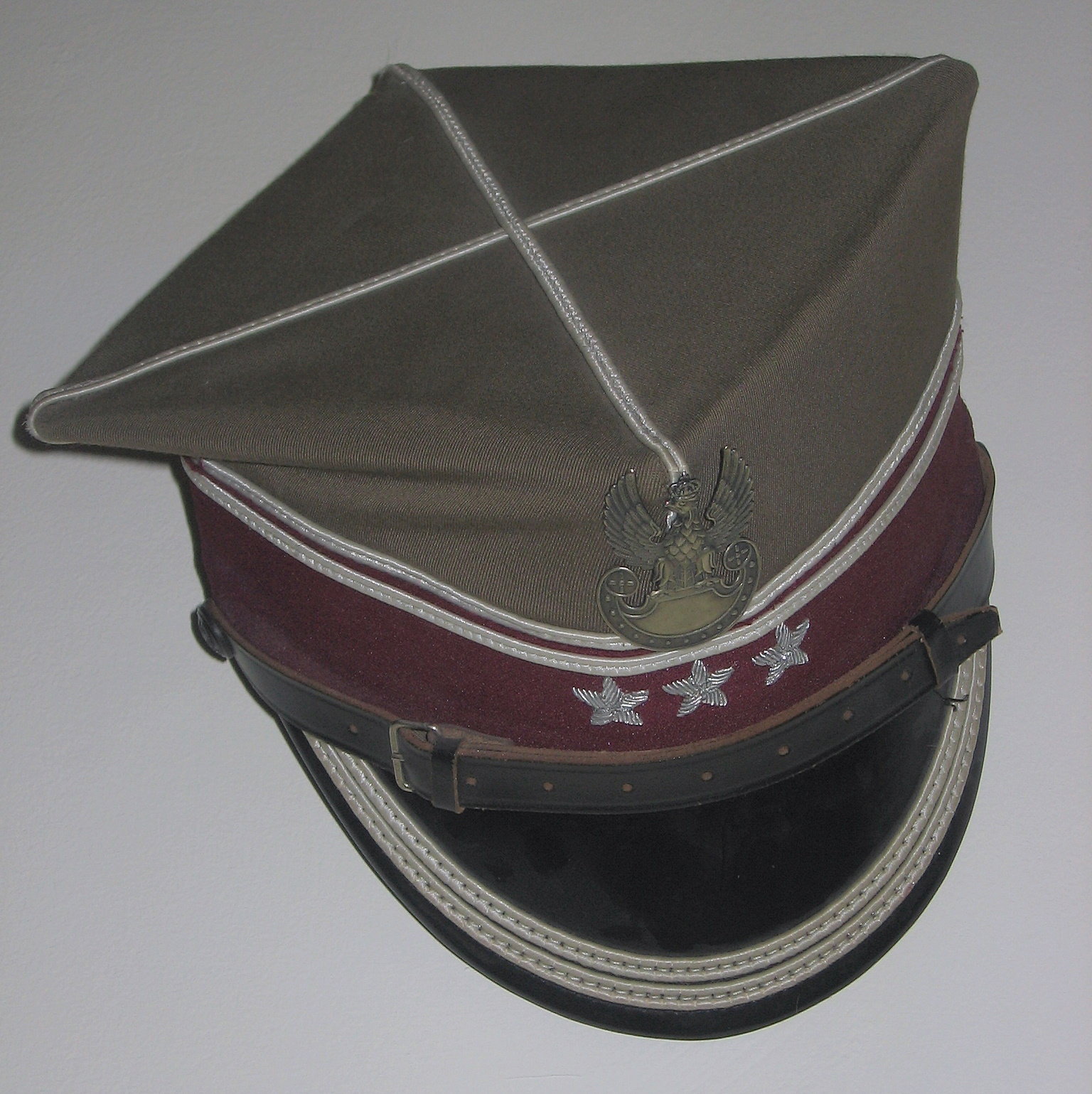
Rogatywka with the military eagle, the emblem of Polish armed forces, and three stars, the rank insignia of a pułkownik (colonel)

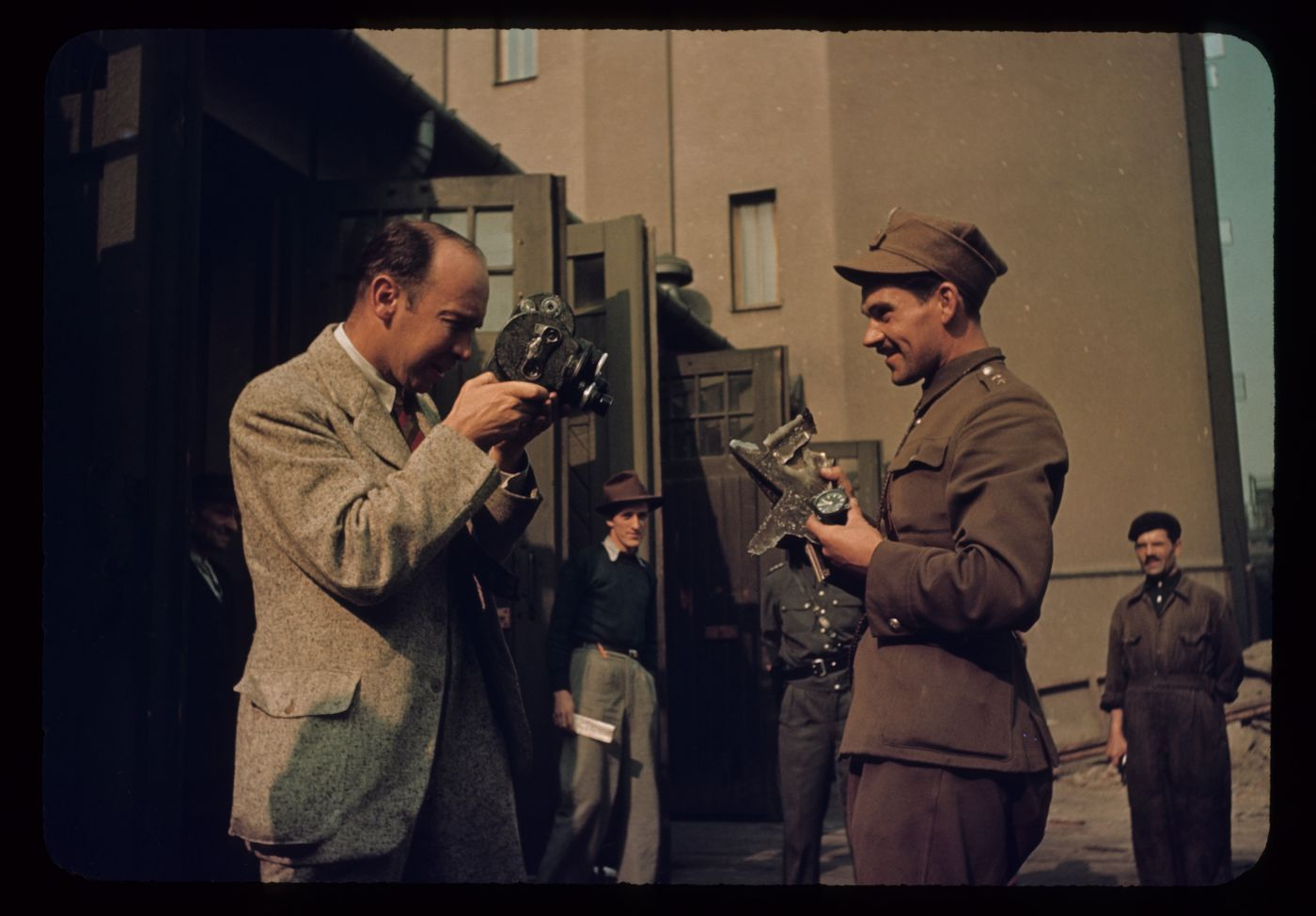
Polish Army soldier wearing the rogatywka in 1939 during the September Campaign

Rogatywka (Polish pronunciation: [rɔɡaˈtɨfka]; sometimes translated as peaked cap) is the Polish generic name for a peaked, four-pointed cap which is an element of the Polish national and folk costume and was used various Polish military formations throughout the ages. It is a distant relative of its 18th-century predecessor, the konfederatka (so-named because of use by members of the Bar Confederation), although similar caps have been used by light cavalry since the 14th century. It consists of a four-pointed top and a short peak, usually made of black or brown leather. Although rogatywka (derived from róg which means "horn" or "corner") in English seems to mean the same as czapka, the word czapka in Polish designates not only rogatywka, but all caps (not hats).

== Konfederatka ==
The konfederatka was based on the hats of the 18th-century Lithuanian Tatar National costumes, as the Grand Ducal Lithuanian Army's Vanguard regiments were heavily influenced by the Lithuanian Tatar dress, among other elements.

== Usage ==
The rogatywka usually comes in two variants: the hardened and soft version.

The hardened model, based on the rogatywka Mk. 1935, olive green with black peak, is used in full gala uniforms, and the rim colour marks unit type (for example, navy blue – typical, scarlet – military police, green – artillery, and so on). It was not worn during most of the People's Republic of Poland era but was reintroduced for ceremonial wear by the Honour Guard Company in 1983. The soft version was used before World War II and during the People's Republic of Poland period for garrison dress; it was withdrawn after 1990.

Polish soldiers decorate their caps not with the emblem of their corps, but with their service's version of the Polish military eagle. The military eagle insignia is based on an early 19th-century design, comprising a modified White Eagle (from the Polish coat of arms) perched atop an "Amazon shield".

Army branches are indicated by the following colored cap bands:

- Navy blue – generals, mechanized troops, National Honour Guard
- Brown – staff officers
- Orange – units dedicated to honour history, armoured troops, scouts
- Dark green – rocket forces, artillery, anti-aircraft units
- Sky blue – army aviation (helicopters)
- Red – intelligence
- Maroon – transportation
- Bronze – civil affairs
- Purple – quartermaster corps, supply and logistics
- Tan – ordnance
- Black – engineering units, chemical corps, cartographic service, technical cadets
- Silver – special forces
- Cornflower – adjutant general corps, radio and communication corps
- White – infantry
- Blue – paratroopers
- Beige- recruit and retention
- Cherry – medical service, medical cadets
- Salmon – legal services
- Mauve – public affairs
- Goldenrod – military bands
- Scarlet – military police
- Gold – accounting and finance
- Violet – chaplains
- Yellow – headquarters of 1st Warsaw Mechanized Division, 1st Warsaw Armoured Division

== Others ==
The rogatywka is used by Polish firefighters (hardened, all navy blue) and Polish State Railways staff (soft, navy blue or red).

Green rogatywkas with brown leather peak and scout Fleur-de-lis symbol are traditionally worn by Polish boy scouts, while grey caps are sometimes used by girl guides.

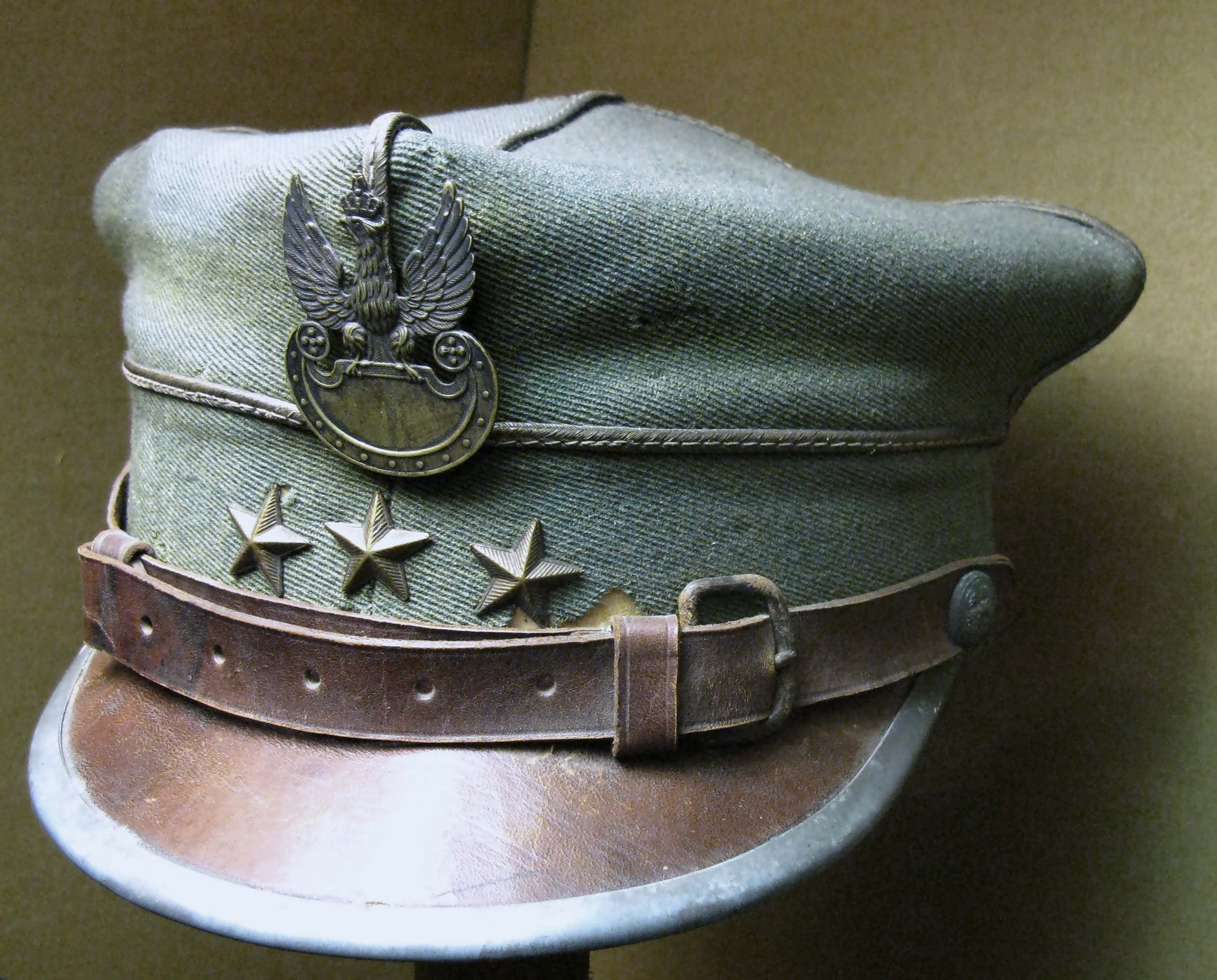
Rogatywka 1919 design

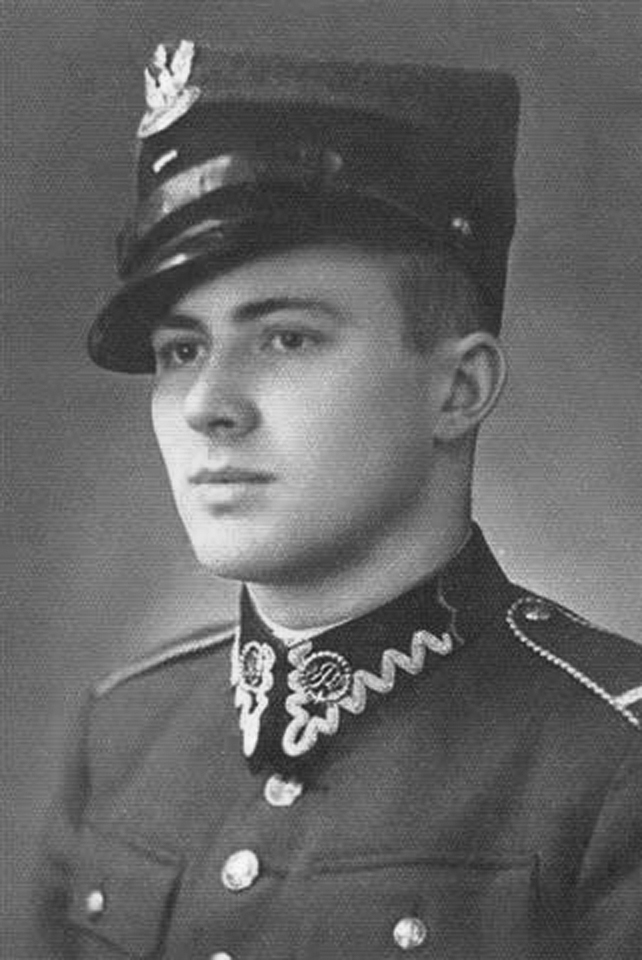
Rogatywka 1935 design

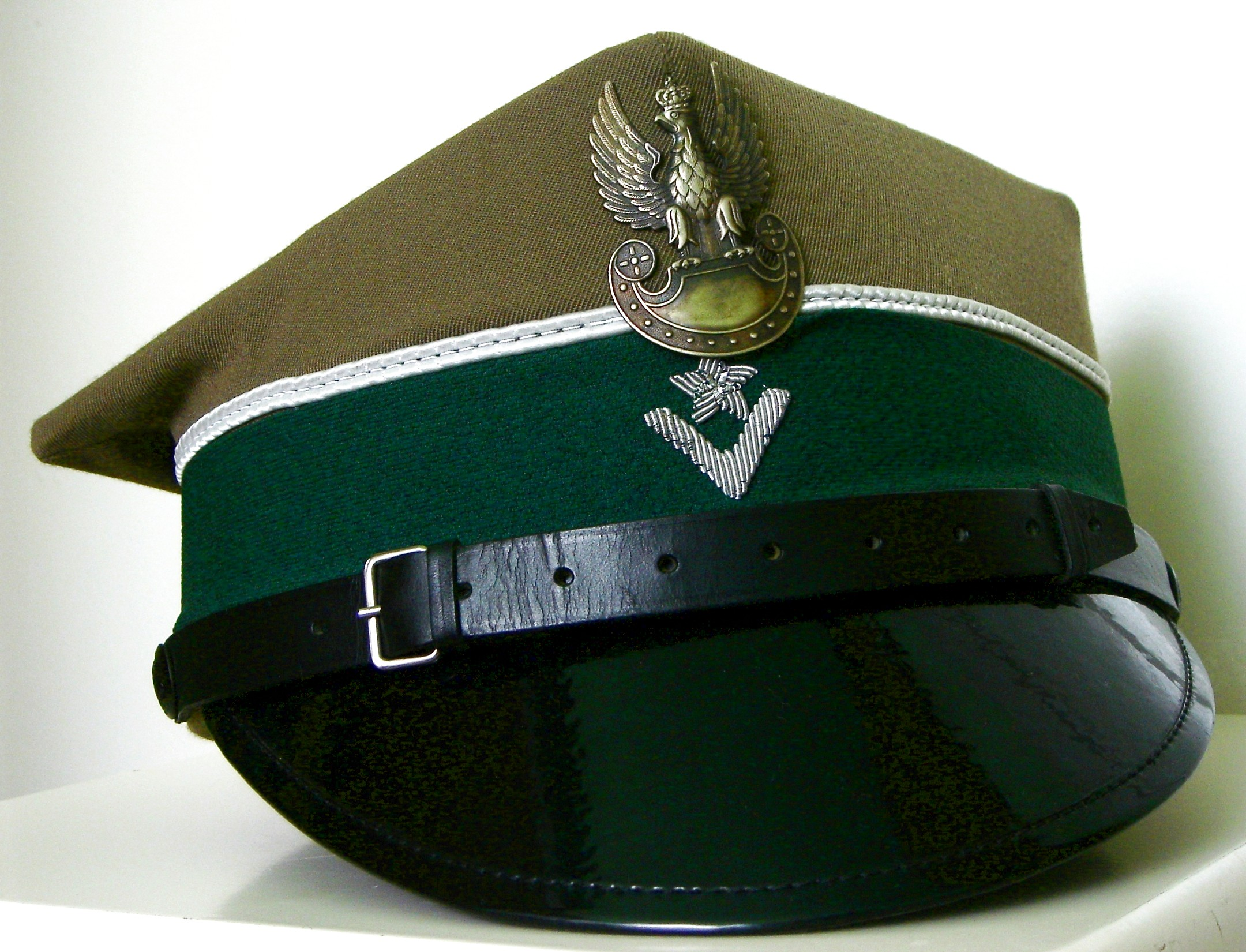
Młodszy chorąży cap

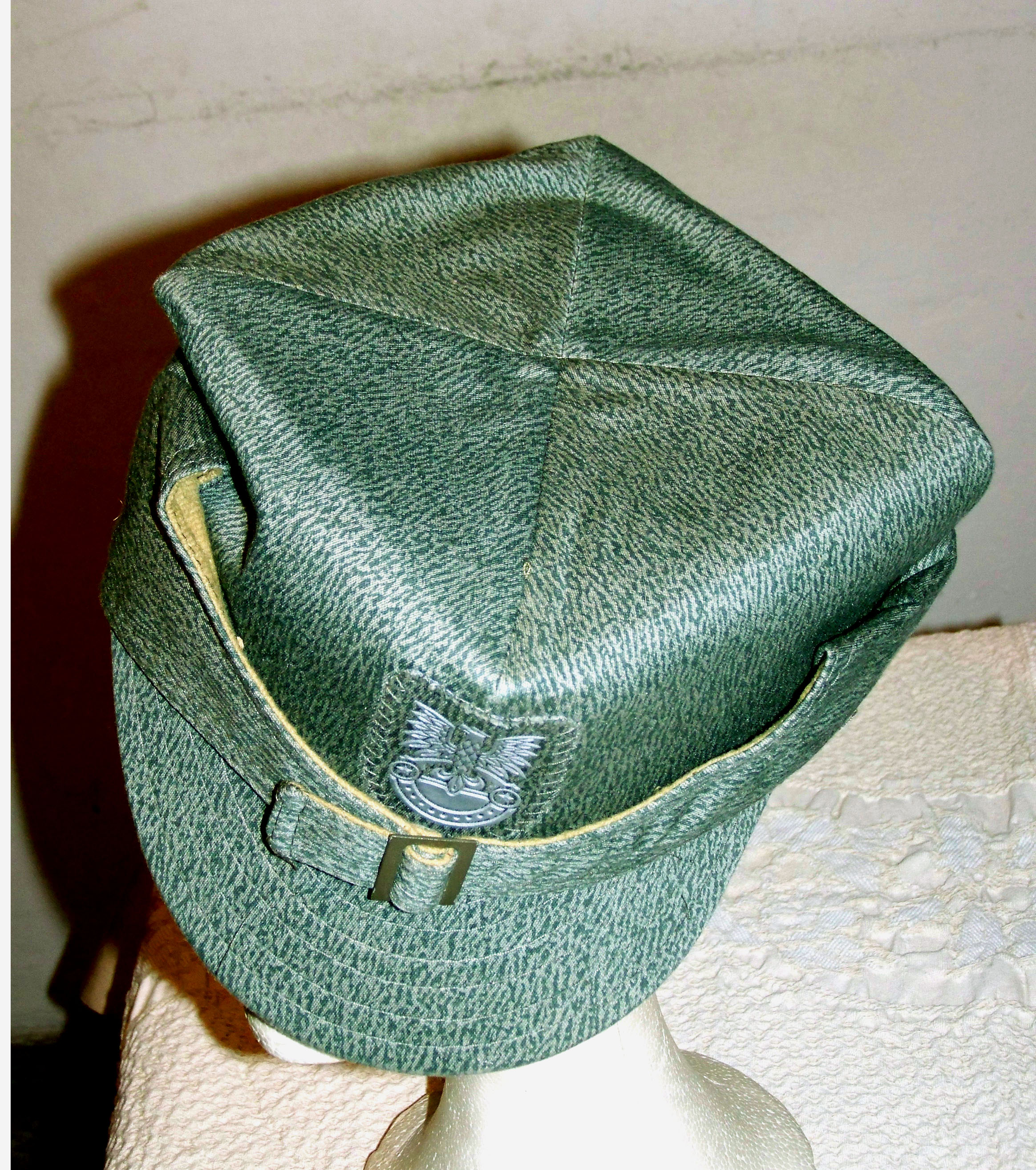
PRL era field cap in wz.68 Camouflage

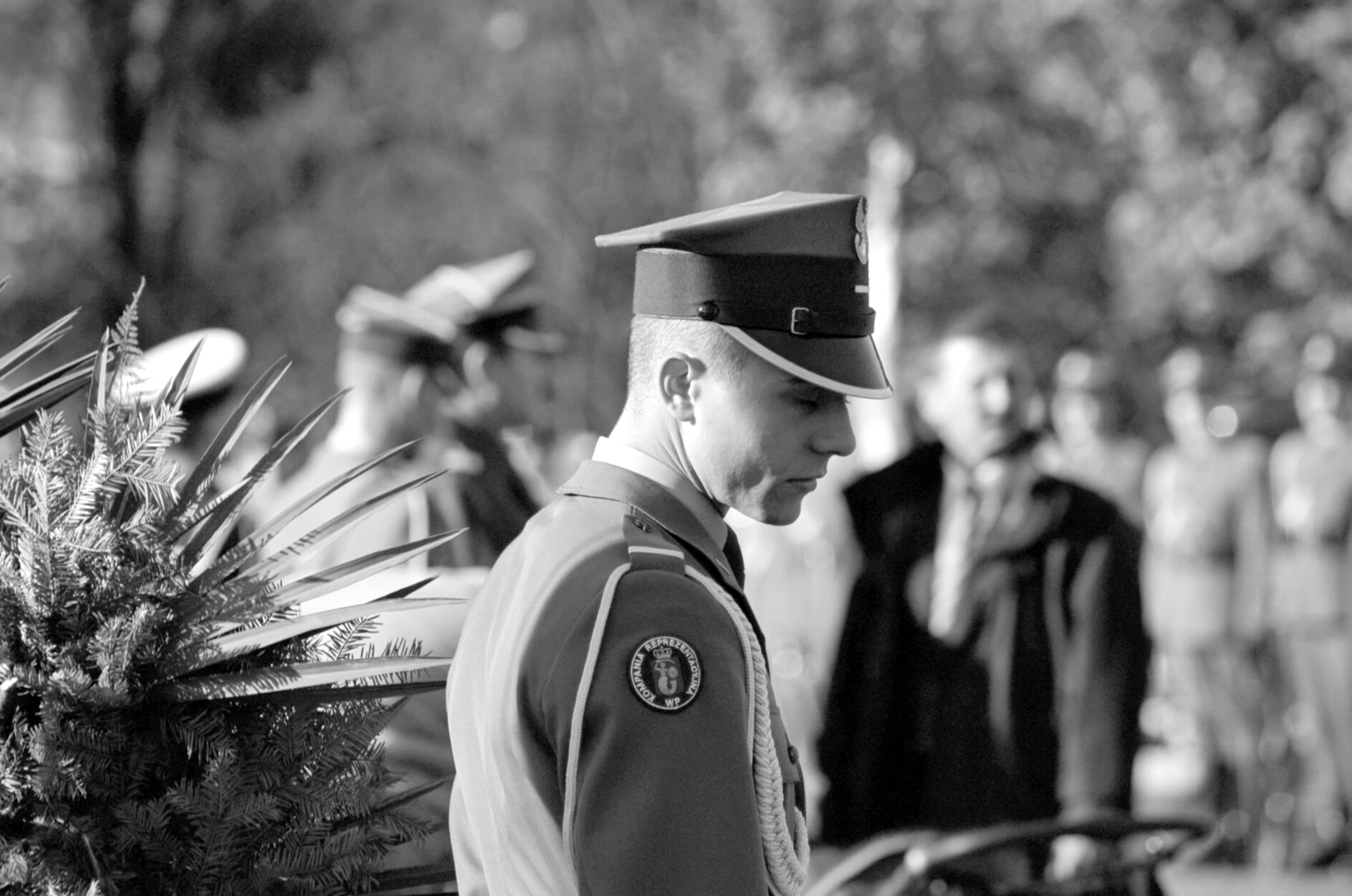
A soldier from the Representative Regiment of the Polish Armed Forces

== See also ==
- List of hat styles
