= I've Had Enough 2023 =

Polish political party

I've Had Enough 2023 Mam Dość 2023
- Founded: 11 May 2022
- Dissolved: 18 November 2024

Website
- https://mamdosc.org.pl/

I've Had Enough 2023 (Polish: Mam Dość 2023), or simply I've Had Enough (Mam Dość; pronounced [mãm dɔɕt͡ɕ]), was a political party in Poland founded by the wife of the PiS minister Łukasz Schreiber, Marianna Schreiber, on 11 May 2022 ahead of the 2023 parliamentary election. The party described itself as pro-EU, favoring social liberalism and a social market economy in the economic field and liberal conservatism and Christian democracy elsewhere. The party declared support for the legalization of gay marriages in Poland.

In Poland, one of the requirements for registration of a political party is signatures from 1000 adult Polish citizens in support of the application. According to Schreiber, she initially submitted a list of 700 signatures to the court, with the knowledge that that is not enough signatures, and the court found all but less than 200 of them invalid.

According to the board of the party, Schreiber was taken off the party's registration application for 'violations of the party's statute' and stated that she was never the founder or the leader of the party. Schreiber said that the party's application for registration was accepted after it was withdrawn, and said that she did not know anyone on the board of I've Had Enough. The deputy head of the party, Sylwester Zacheja, disputed this, stating that the board members knew Schreiber personally and that they were present at her military oath.

Marianna Schreiber announced on 17 August 2023 on social media that she would no longer be involved with politics. The party was dissolved on 18 November 2024.
