= Yacht Club of Poland =

Yacht-Club of Poland
- Burgee

- Ensign
- Short name: YKP
- Founded: 1924
- Janusz Marek Taber
- Website: www.ykp.pl

The Yacht Club of Poland (officially Yacht Klub Polski) is a yacht club in Poland. It's a member of the Polish Yachting Association.

== History ==
The Club was founded December 10, 1924, under the name Polish Yacht Club (from 1925 Yacht Club of Poland) as a nationwide organization with the right to create branches. The action began with the sailors in Warsaw under the chairmanship of Antoni Aleksandrowicz. Branches were created including in Warsaw, Gdynia, and other cities. One of the founders and first commandant was Mariusz Zaruski.
