= General (Poland) =

Polish language term for the rank of General

Four-star general's shoulder strap

Generał (pronounced [ɡɛˈnɛraw]) is the generic Polish language term for the rank of general. In narrow sense it is used to denote the rank of a four-star general introduced on August 15, 2002 (formerly generał armii - general of the army). The highest rank of the Polish Armed Forces, Marshal of Poland, is not used in peacetime, leaving generał as the highest rank. The symbols of the rank are the wężyk generalski (pronounced [ˈvɛ̃ʐɨk ɡɛnɛˈralskʲi]), or "general's wavy line", and four stars, present on the rogatywka cap, sleeves of the uniform, and above the breast pocket of a field uniform.

== History ==
In Polish military traditions the highest rank was always the rank of Marshal of Poland, with three general's grades below. However, the system differed significantly from other systems of rank insignia used in both armies of the Warsaw Pact and the NATO. Because of lack of the rank of four-star general, the Polish ranks were usually a grade higher than their name suggested. Thus the rank of generał brygady was an equivalent of Major General rather than Brigadier General as the name suggested.

On March 27, 1919, the Minister of Military Affairs in the Second Polish Republic, Lieutenant General Józef Leśniewski, established the following designations for generals in the Polish Armed Forces "for the purpose of standardizing officer rank nomenclature":

- Generał broni (General of the Arm—specifically of infantry, cavalry, or artillery),
- Generał porucznik (Lieutenant General),
- Generał podporucznik (Major General).

At the same time, he stipulated that the rank of generał porucznik replaced the rank of generał dywizji (Divisional General), and the rank of generał podporucznik was to be used instead of generał brygady (Brigade General) or generał major (Major General). Officers holding the rank of generał porucznik or generał podporucznik who served in technical troops, support services, or the Navy's Sea Corps were entitled to the following titles:

- generał porucznik of the Judicial Corps or generał podporucznik of the Judicial Corps,
- generał porucznik (Medical) or generał podporucznik (Medical),
- generał porucznik (Quartermaster) or *generał podporucznik* (Quartermaster),
- generał porucznik (Navy) or generał podporucznik (Navy).

In 1954, during the integration of the Polish People's Army with the structures of the Warsaw Pact (and, more precisely, of the Red Army), a new rank of generał armii (General of an Army) was introduced, as a direct copy of the Soviet rank of General of the Army (Russian: Генерал армии). However, after the death of Joseph Stalin and the end of Stalinism in Poland, the general officers rank structure returned to the pre-war pattern. In 1981 Gen. Wojciech Jaruzelski (being at this time the 1st Secretary of the Polish United Workers' Party, the Prime Minister and the Minister of the National Defense) introduced again the rank of general of the army. As the only person to hold the newly introduced rank, he was thought of as an ersatz-Marshal, as he could not promote himself to the rank of Marshal of Poland after the death of Marian Spychalski. In 1995 the rank was yet again abolished; the last pre-NATO generałs were Jaruzelski and Gen. Florian Siwicki, who both died in the early 2010s.

However, with Poland's entry into the structures of NATO in 1999 a need arose to unify the Polish rank system with that of English-speaking countries (and more precisely, the US). Hence the rank of generał was re-introduced. The rank of Marshal of Poland remains as the "wartime" rank, given to the chief of general staff in case of war or a successful military commander after a victorious campaign.
