= Constitution of the Free State of Saxony =

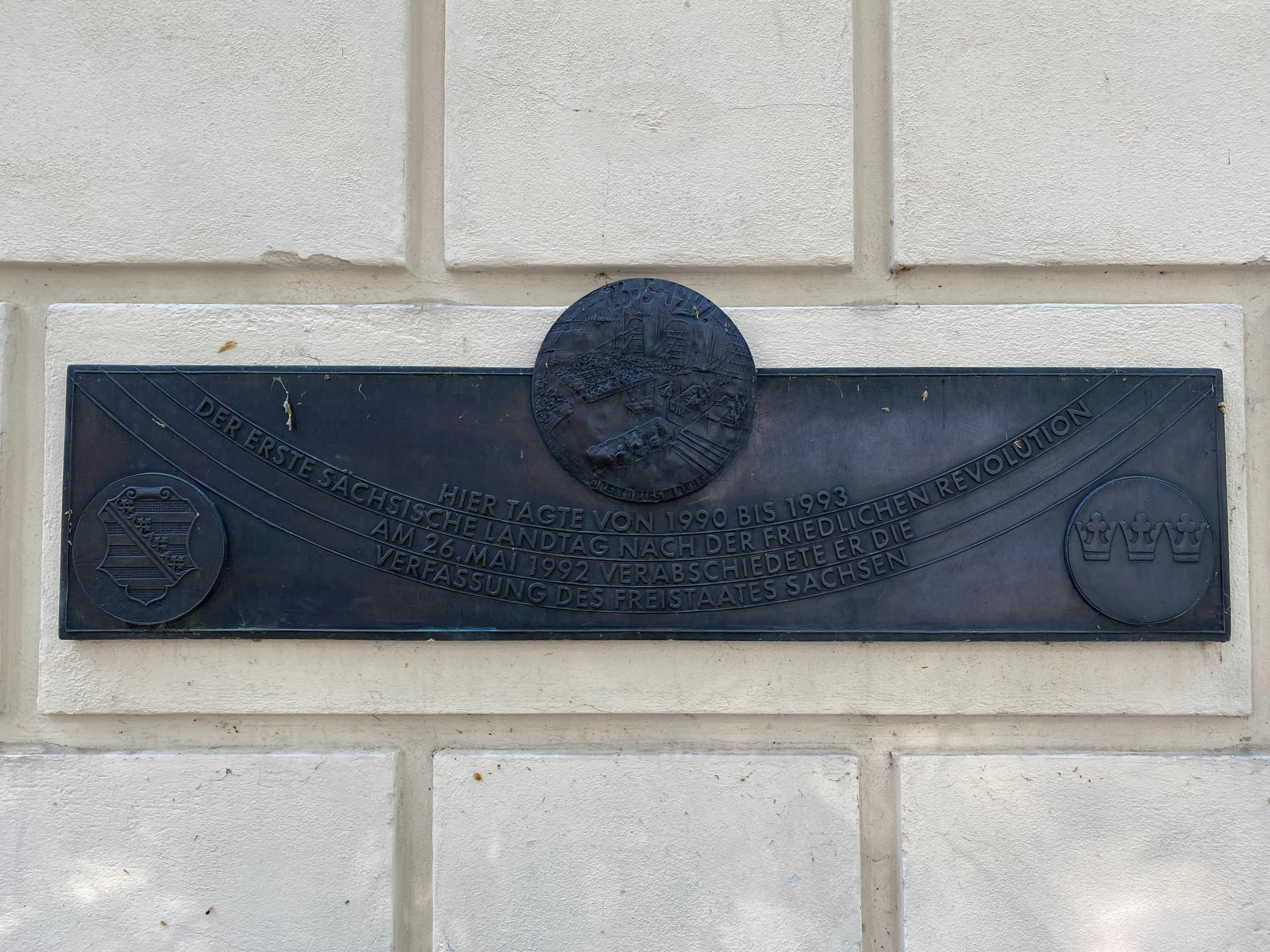
This plaque at the Dreikönigskirche in Dresden commemorates the adoption of the Constitution of the Free State of Saxony on 27 May 1992.

The Constitution of the Free State of Saxony was issued on 27 May 1992. It came into force on 6 June 1992. The Saxon State Parliament, as the constitutional state assembly, passed it on 26 May 1992 with a majority of 132 votes to 15, with 4 abstentions. beschlossen. Sie wurde bisher nur einmal geändert, um eine Schuldenbremse einzufügen.

== History ==
The precursors of this constitution were the Saxon constitutions of 1831 for the Kingdom of Saxony, of 1920 for the period of the Weimar Republic and of 1947 during the Soviet occupation. The Sächsische Verfassungsmedaille (Saxon Constitutional Medal) was established in 1997 to mark the fifth anniversary of the final vote on the constitution. It is awarded annually to individuals who have made a special contribution to the free, democratic development of the Free State.

In July 2013, the Saxon State Parliament added a debt brake (Article 95) to the constitution, which was intended to prevent future state parliaments from taking on new debt. A second amendment to the constitution in the 2019-2024 legislative period failed due to resistance from some CDU MPs. With only one amendment, it is one of the constitutions that has been amended the least among the German states.

== Contents ==
Preamble

Building on the history of the Margraviate of Meissen, the Saxon state and the Lower Silesian region, supported by traditions of Saxon constitutional history, starting from the painful experiences of National Socialist and Communist tyranny, mindful of their own guilt in the past, guided by the will to serve justice, peace and the preservation of creation, the people of the Free State of Saxony have given themselves this constitution thanks to the peaceful revolution of October 1989.

Sections

1. The foundations of the state (13 articles)
2. The basic rights (25 articles)
3. The state parliament (20 articles)
4. The state government (11 articles)
5. The legislation (7 articles)
6. The judiciary (5 articles)
7. The administration (11 articles)
8. The financial system (8 articles)
9. The education system (8 articles)
10. The churches and religious communities (4 articles)
11. Transitional and final provisions (10 articles)
12. Appendix to Article 109 paragraph 4 (Articles 136, 137, 138, 139, 141 Weimar Constitution)

In particular, the preamble, which emphasizes Saxony's centuries-long history, and the catalogue of fundamental rights, which exceeds that of the Basic Law in terms of scope, are special features of the Free State's constitution. According to the provisions of the constitution, Saxony is also one of three free states with one of two state governments. In other federal states (except Bavaria) the government is called the state government.

== Literature ==
- Christoph Degenhart / Claus Meissner (eds.): Handbook of the Constitution of the Free State of Saxony. Richard Boorberg Verlag, Stuttgart, Munich, Hanover, Berlin, Weimar, Dresden 1997.
- Rolf Stober (ed.): Sources on the history of the creation of the Saxon Constitution. Documentation. Verlag Recht und Verwaltung, Dresden 1993.
- Harald Baumann-Hasske / Bernd Kunzmann (eds.): The Constitution of the Free State of Saxony. Commentary. Berliner Wissenschafts-Verlag, Berlin 2011.
