= Flag of Galicia and Lodomeria =

Flag of former kingdom

Flags of Galicia and Lodomeria

1809–1849

1849–1890

1890–1918

Throughout its existence, from 1772 to 1918, the Kingdom of Galicia and Lodomeria, used three flag designs to represent itself.

== History ==
The banner of Lodomeria flown in 1618 during the coronation of King Ferdinand II.

The Kingdom of Galicia and Lodomeria was a constituent possession of the Habsburg monarchy, that existed from 1772 to 1918.

In 1618, the banner of Lodomeria, was flown among others, during the coronation of King Ferdinand II. It depicted a coat of arms divided into five vertical stripes, that altered between a blue stripe, and the stripe divided into six fields, alternating between white and red, displayed in two rows each containing three of them. On top of it was placed a yellow (golden) crown with blue jewels. It was placed on a green background.

The first flag of the state had been introduced in 1809, and remained in use until 1849, its flag was divided horizontally into two equally-sized stripes, blue and red. In 1849, from the part of the territory of the Kingdom of Galicia and Lodomeria was partitioned, the Duchy of Bukovina. The duchy continued to use red and blue flag until 1918, when it ceased to exist. Galicia and Lodomeria adopted a new design, which consisted of three horizontal stripes of equal width: blue, red and yellow.

Such design had been used until 1890, when it was replaced by a design consisting of two horizontal stripes of equal width: red and white. Such flag, remained in use until 1918, when the kingdom ceased to exist. Some historians, such as Jan D. Miller, argue, that the flag had amaranth (reddish-rose) stripe instead of a red stripe. However, Oesterreichisch-ungarische Wappenrolle, a coloured table of flags published in 1898, states that red and white flag was the flag of the Kingdom of Galicia and Lodomeria, while amaranth and white flag, was a flag of Polish minority within Austria-Hungary.

The flag was used until 1918, when the Kingdom of Galicia and Lodomeria ceased to exist.

== Gallery ==
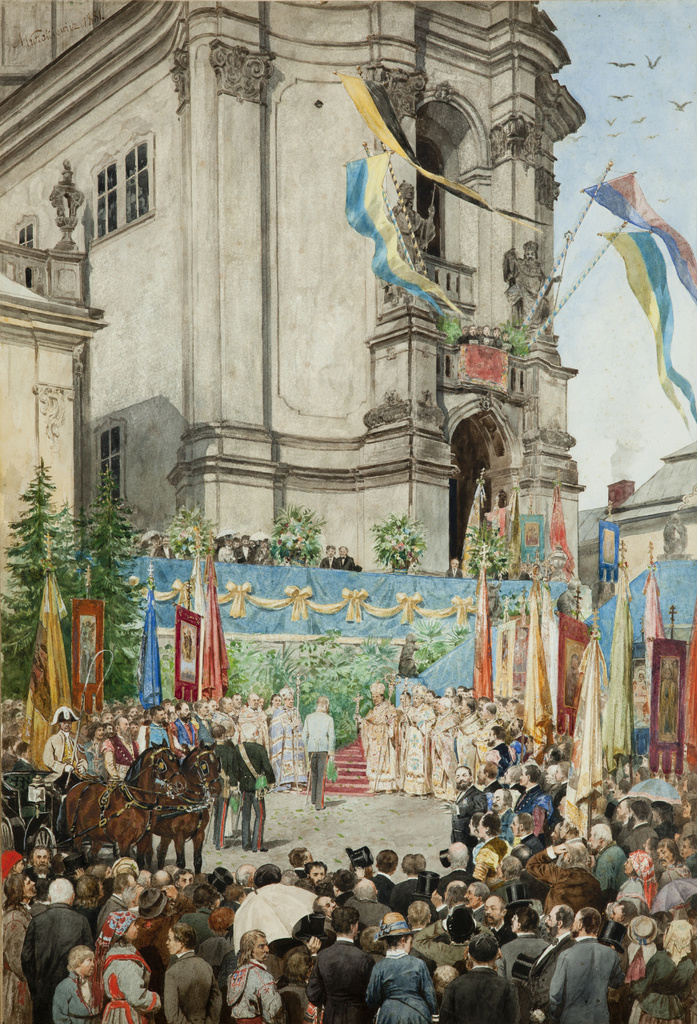
Celebrated visit of Emperor at the Cathedral of St. George in Lviv in September 1880 (flags:Emperor's-black and yellow, Galicia-blue and red, city of Lviv-yellow and blue)
