= Marshal of Poland =

Highest rank in the Polish Army

Marshal of Poland Marszałek Polski
- Rank flag

- Shoulder strap
- Country: Poland
- Service branch: Polish Land Forces; Polish Air Force; Polish Navy; Polish Special Forces; Polish Territorial Defence Force
- Rank: Five-star
- NATO rank code: OF-10
- Formation: 19 March 1920
- Next lower rank: General; Admiral (Navy, JW Formoza)

Marshal of Poland (Polish: Marszałek Polski) is the highest rank in the Polish Army. It has been granted to only six officers. At present, Marshal is equivalent to a field marshal or general of the army (OF-10) in other NATO armies.

== History ==
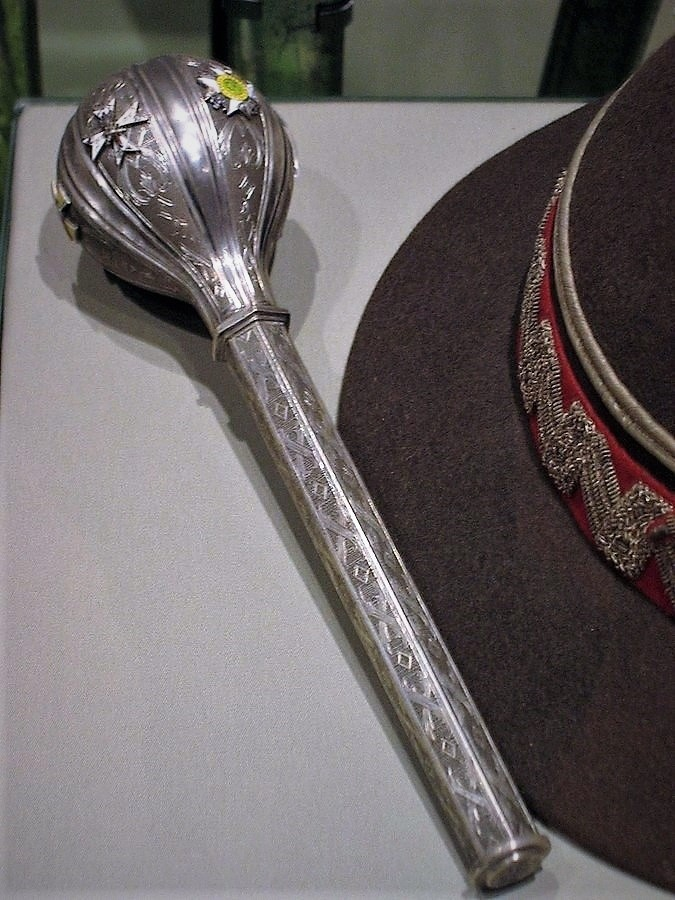
Buława of a Marshal of Poland

Today there are no living Marshals of Poland, since this rank is bestowed only on military commanders who have achieved victory in war. Recently, however, the rank of four-star with the modernised name Generał has been introduced, and on August 15, 2002, was granted to Czesław Piątas, at present civilian, former Chief of the General Staff of the Polish Armed Forces.

== List of Marshals ==
In all, the following people have served as Marshals of Poland.

No.	Portrait	Name (Birth-Death)	Appointed	Aged	Information
1		Józef Piłsudski (1867–1935)	19 March 1920	52 years, 105 days	First Marshal of Poland
2		Ferdinand Foch (1851–1929)	13 April 1923	71 years, 193 days	French general who was Supreme Allied Commander during World War I, also made Marshal of France and an honorary British Field Marshal
3		Edward Rydz-Śmigły (1886–1941)	10 November 1936	50 years, 244 days	Served as Marshal until World War II. He was a major figure during the invasion of Poland.
4		Michał Rola-Żymierski (1890–1989)	3 May 1945	54 years, 241 days	First Marshal of the Polish People's Republic
5		Konstanty Rokossowski (1896–1968)	5 November 1949	52 years, 319 days	Also Marshal of the Soviet Union
6		Marian Spychalski (1906–1980)	7 October 1963	56 years, 305 days	Died in office
