= Heraldic Commission =

- Komisja Heraldyczna
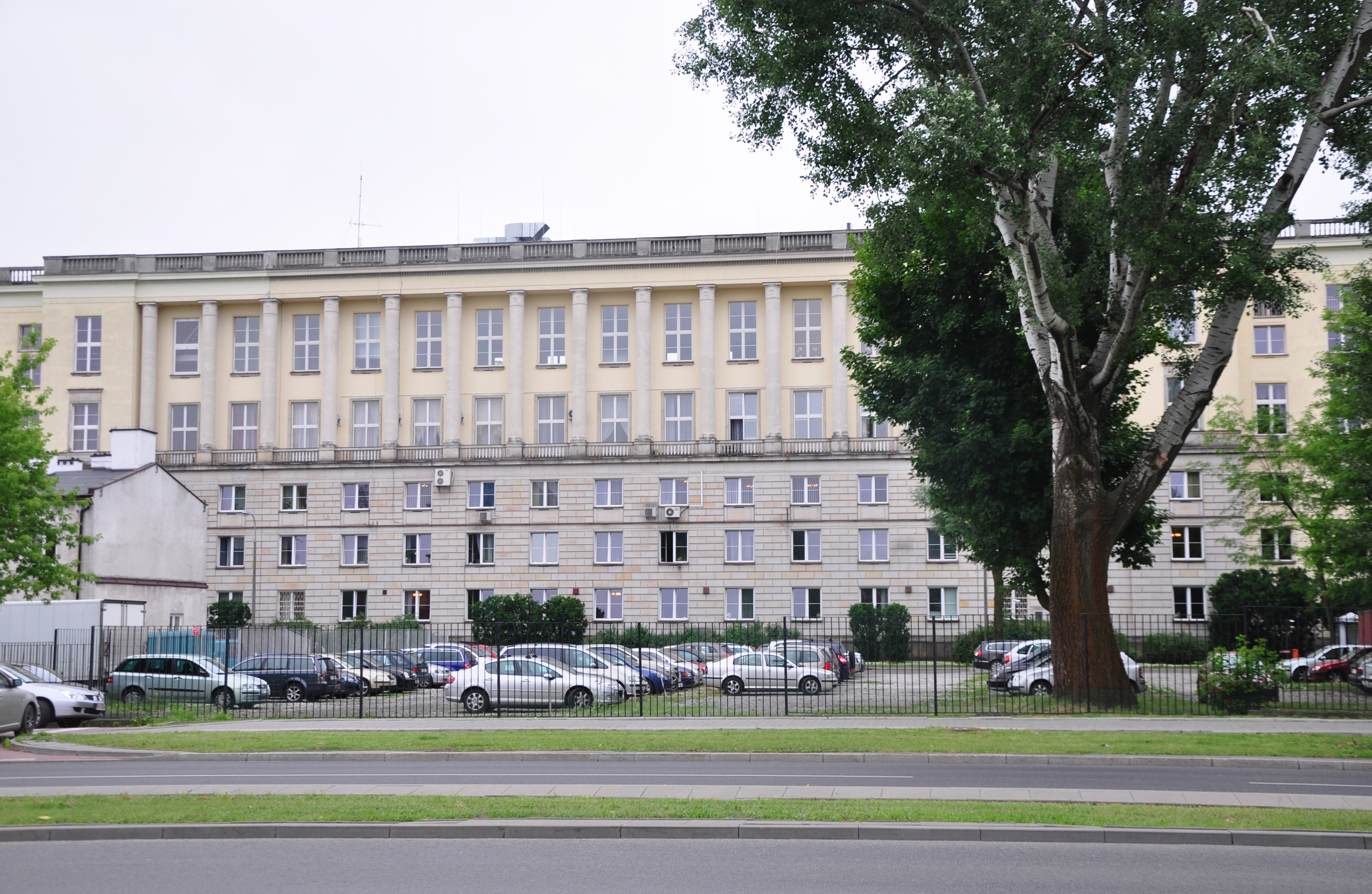
- State Administration Building at Batorego St., Warsaw

Advisory body overview
- Formed: 1999; 27 years ago
- Jurisdiction: Poland
- Status: Active
- Headquarters: ul. Batorego 5, 02-591 Warsaw
- Responsible Minister responsible: Minister of Interior and Administration
- Advisory body executives: Jan Wroniszewski, Chairman; Tadeusz Romuald Jeziorowski, Deputy Chairman
- Parent department: Ministry of Interior and Administration
- Website: www.gov.pl/web/mswia/komisja-heraldyczna

The Heraldic Commission (Polish: Komisja Heraldyczna) is an advisory and consultative body to the minister responsible for public administration regarding matters of heraldry, vexillology, and phaleristics. It was established under the Act of 29 December 1998, which amended the 1978 Act on Badges and Uniforms.

== History ==
The Heraldic Commission initially operated under the Ministry of Interior and Administration (MSWiA). Following reforms in 2011, it was briefly moved to the Ministry of Digital Affairs, before returning to the Ministry of Interior and Administration in 2012.

== Structure ==
The commission is composed of individuals distinguished by their high level of knowledge in heraldry and vexillology, representatives of organizations whose statutory goals are related to these fields, and representatives of local government units.

The body is structured with a chairman, a deputy chairman, a secretary, and ten members. The first members were appointed by the Minister of Interior and Administration on 20 January 2000.

The first chairman was Stefan Krzysztof Kuczyński, who served from 2000 to 2007. Due to his absence starting in 2007, his duties were assumed by his deputy, Henryk Seroka. From 2008 to 2024, the role of chairman was held by Rev. Paweł Dudziński. Following a motion by the Minister of Culture and National Heritage, Piotr Gliński, to remove Dudziński from the commission, Jan Wroniszewski took over as chairman on 26 April 2024.

In April 2024, in response to calls for the inclusion of visual arts experts in the commission, Dr. Hab. Anna Myczkowska-Szczerska, a professor at the Jan Matejko Academy of Fine Arts in Kraków and a specialist in visual communication design, was appointed to the commission at the request of the Minister of Culture and National Heritage.

== See also ==
- Heraldry
- Vexillology
- Polish heraldry
