= Flag of Podkarpackie Voivodeship =

Flag of the Podkarpackie Voivodeship
- Use: Podkarpackie Voivodeship
- Proportion: 5:8
- Adopted: 23 November 2000
- Design: Rectangle divided vertically in 3 stripes with smaller white stripes on the sides, and bigger white stripe in the middle, with the coat of arms of the Podkarpackie Voivodeship in centre.

The flag is the symbol of the Podkarpackie Voivodeship, Poland.

== Design ==
The flag is a rectangle with the aspect ratio of height to width ratio of 5:8. It is vertically divided into 3 stripes, with blue stripes on the left and right sides of the flag, each one being the length of 3/16 of the flag. The middle stripe, with the length of 10/16 of the flag, is white. In the centre of the flag is the coat of arms of the Podkarpackie Voivodeship.

The coat of arms is made of the Iberian style escutcheon that is divided vertically into two parts, that are of red and blue colour. On the left side, within the red part, is a silver (white) griffin with a golden (yellow) crown, beak, and claws. On the right, within the blue part, is a golden (yellow) Ruthenian lion with a red tongue. In the middle, in the upper part, above the creatures, is a silver (white) cross pattée with the edges of the arms concave throughout.

== History ==
The coat of arms was established as the symbol of the voivodeship on 28 August 2000.
