= Coat of arms of Podkarpackie Voivodeship =

Polish coat of arms

Coat of arms of the Podkarpackie Voivodeship
- Armiger: Józef Bryk, Voivode of the Podkarpackie Voivodeship
- Shield: Red and blue Iberian style escutcheon
- Compartment: Silver (white) griffin with a golden (yellow) crown, beak, and claws on the left, and a golden (yellow) Ruthenian lion with a red tongue on the right, and the silver (white) cross pattée abothe them
- Use: Podkarpackie Voivodeship

The coat of arms that serves as a symbol of the Podkarpackie Voivodeship, Poland.

== Design ==
The coat of arms is made of the Iberian style escutcheon that is divided vertically into two parts, that are of red and blue colour. On the left side, within the red part, is a silver (white) griffin with a golden (yellow) crown, beak, and claws. On the right, within the blue part, is a golden (yellow) Ruthenian lion with a red tongue. In the middle, in the upper part, above the creatures, is a silver (white) cross pattée with the edges of the arms concave throughout.

== Symbolism ==
The griffin in the coat of arms symbolizes the Belz Voivodeship, while the Ruthenian lion symbolizes the Ruthenian Voivodeship. Both of those voivodeships were part of the Polish–Lithuanian Commonwealth, from 15th to 18th century, and were located where, in modern times, the Podkarpackie Voivodeship is located. The cross pattée comes from the coat of arms of the city of Rzeszów, which is the capital of the voivodeship.

== History ==
The coat of arms was established as the symbol of the voivodeship on 28 August 2000.
