= Ruthenian lion =

Historical European coat of arms

Versions
- Kingdom of Galicia-Volhynia (Ruthenia)

- Ruthenian Voivodship

- Lviv
- Use: Kingdom of Galicia-Volhynia (Ruthenia); Ruthenian Voivodeship; West Ukrainian People's Republic; Lviv
- Families: Rurik dynasty

The Ruthenian lion (Ukrainian: Руський лев, romanized: Ruskyi lev, Polish: Lew ruski), also known as the Ukrainian lion or Galician lion, is a golden lion on an azure background. The lion was featured on the historic coat of arms of the Kingdom of Galicia-Volhynia (Ruthenia), the Ruthenian Voivodeship and the Western Ukrainian People's Republic. During the revolutions in the Austrian Empire in 1848, it was restored as one of the national symbols of Ukrainians and the Ukrainian national liberation movement. Today it is featured on the coat of arms of the city of Lviv and its surrounding province, Lviv Oblast.

Usually, it was depicted as stocky, less often walking, crowned, with silver or red weapons, resting on a gold or silver rock. The oldest images appear on the seals of rulers from the fourteenth century – Yurii I of Galicia, Leo II of Galicia, Yurii II Boleslav, Vladislaus II of Opole. In the 15th–16th centuries the lion was present on the large seals of Kings Władysław II Jagiełło, Alexander Jagiellon, and Sigismund II Augustus as a symbol of Rus, along with the Polish eagle, the Lithuanian pahonia, and the Prussian eagle. Provincially it was used as the emblem of Lwów Land in the form of a lion on a rock in 15th century. In modern times it is used generally as a symbol of western Ukrainian lands, notably in Lviv and the surrounding region of Galicia. He was depicted with the emblems of Ukrainian military formations of the twentieth century – the Ukrainian Sich Riflemen (1914–1918) and the 14th SS-Volunteer Division "Galicia" (1943–1945). It is used as a coat of arms in Polish heraldry, in particular in Częstochowa and the Subcarpathian Voivodeship.

== History ==
=== Kingdom of Galicia-Volhynia (Ruthenia) ===
The Ruthenian lion first appears on the seal of King Leo I of Galicia, dated to the second half of the thirteenth century. A similar seal was also used by his son and successor Yuri Lvovych. On its obverse there is a static image of the monarch on the throne, and on the reverse – an armed rider holding a shield with the image of a lion on his hind legs. On the seal the inscription in Latin: S[igillum] Domini Georgi Regis Rusie ('Seal of the master George-Yurii, King of Rus'), and on the back: S[igillum] Domini Georgi Ducis Ladimerie (seal of the hospodar George-Yuri, Prince (Vo)lodymyria).

On the seal of his son Leo II of Galicia, only a lion without a rider is depicted; the beast stands on its hind legs and turns to the left.

Figures of lions as symbols of Rus are found on silver coins of the Lithuanian prince Liubartas, the last ruler of the Kingdom of Ruthenia (1340–1383), and his son Fedor (1384–1387). The same motive is seen on Ruthenian money, the issue of which lasted during the reign of Polish King Casimir III the Great (1349–1370), King Louis I of Hungary (1370–1372, 1378–1382) and his governor – Prince Vladislaus II of Opole (1372–1378).

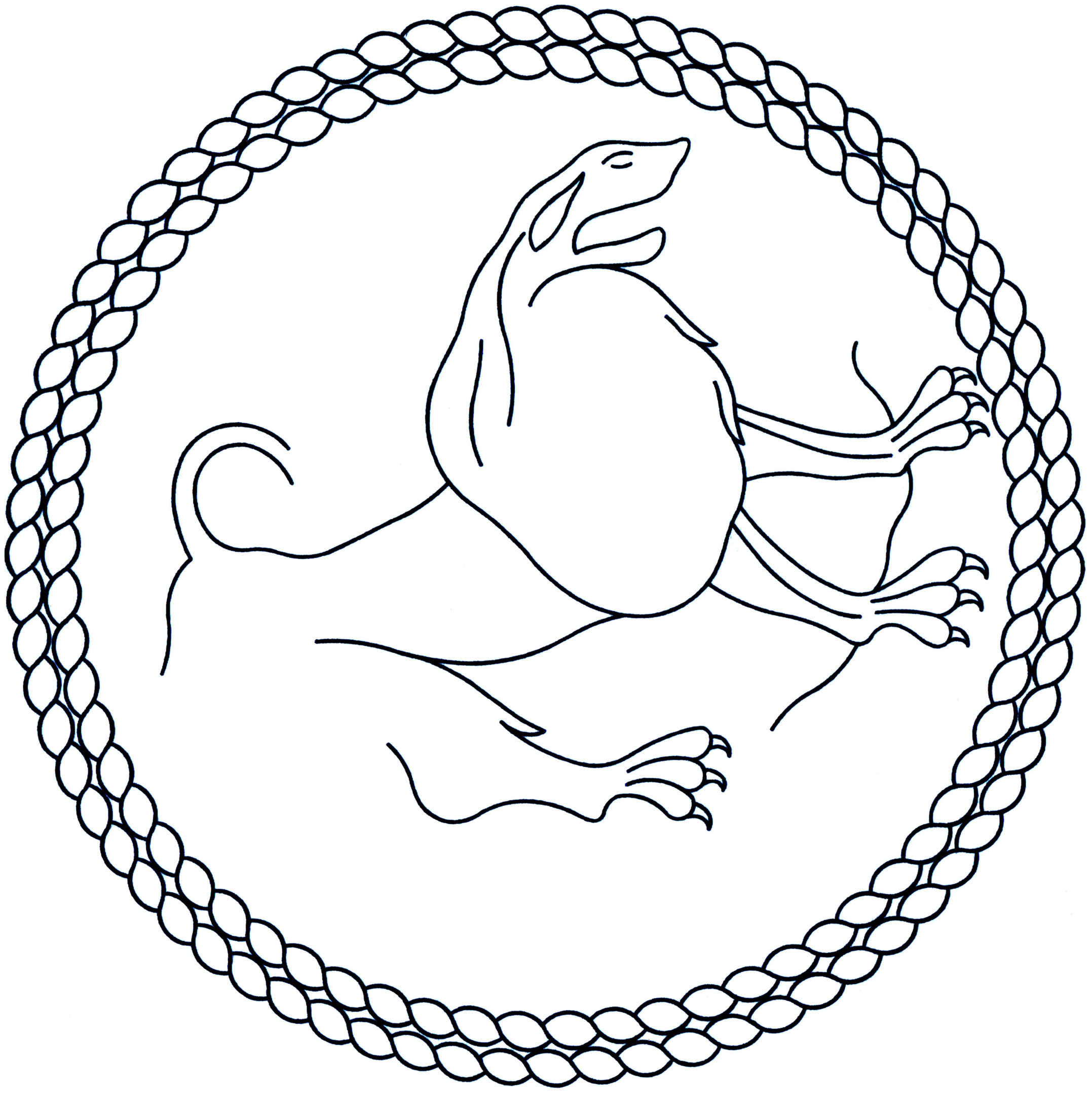
Lion on the obverse of the seal of Leo I of Galicia
Second half of the 13th century

Kingdom of Ruthenia
Fourteenth century

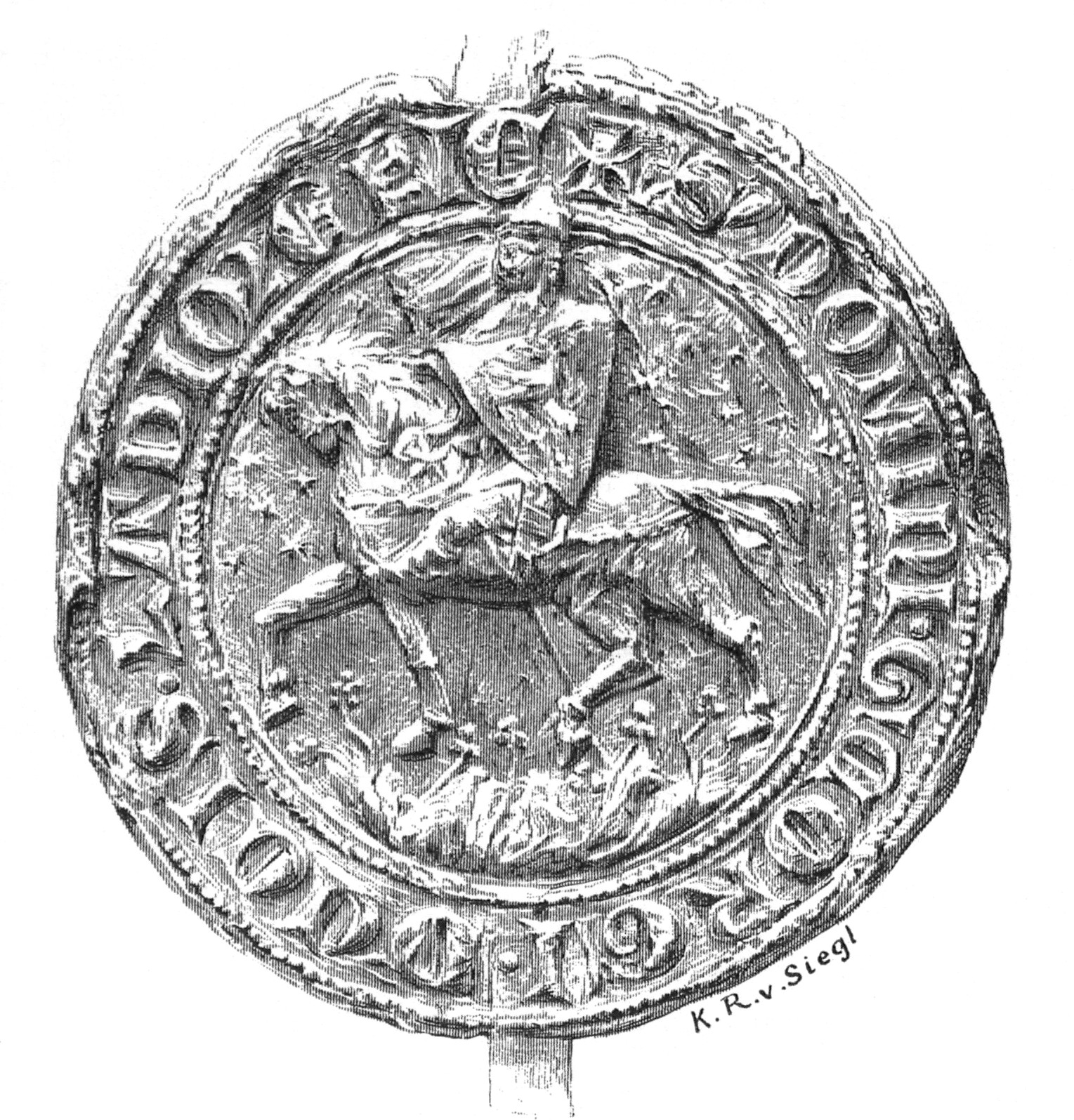
Seal of Yuri I of Galicia
Fourteenth century

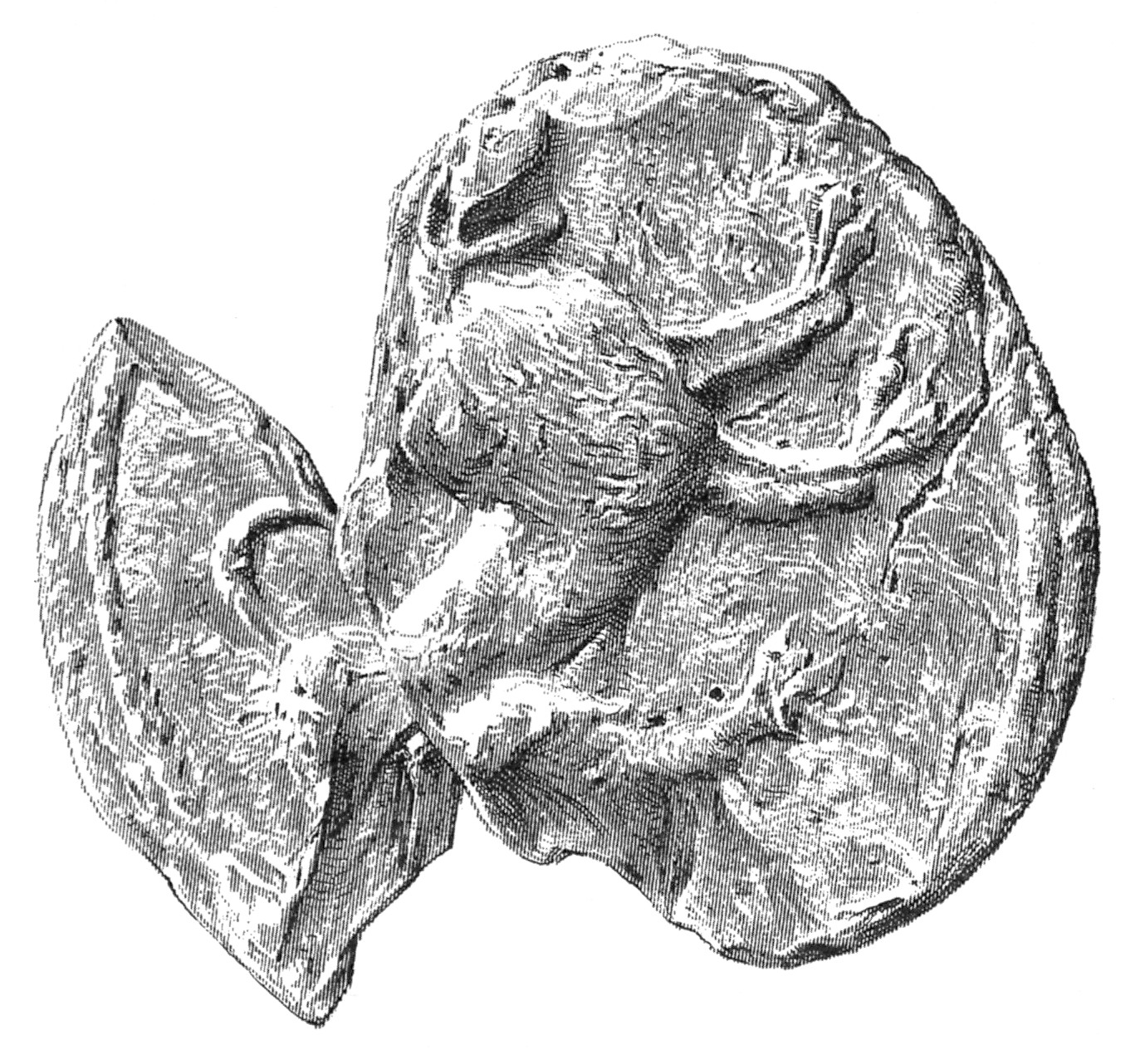
Seal of Leo II of Galicia
Fourteenth century

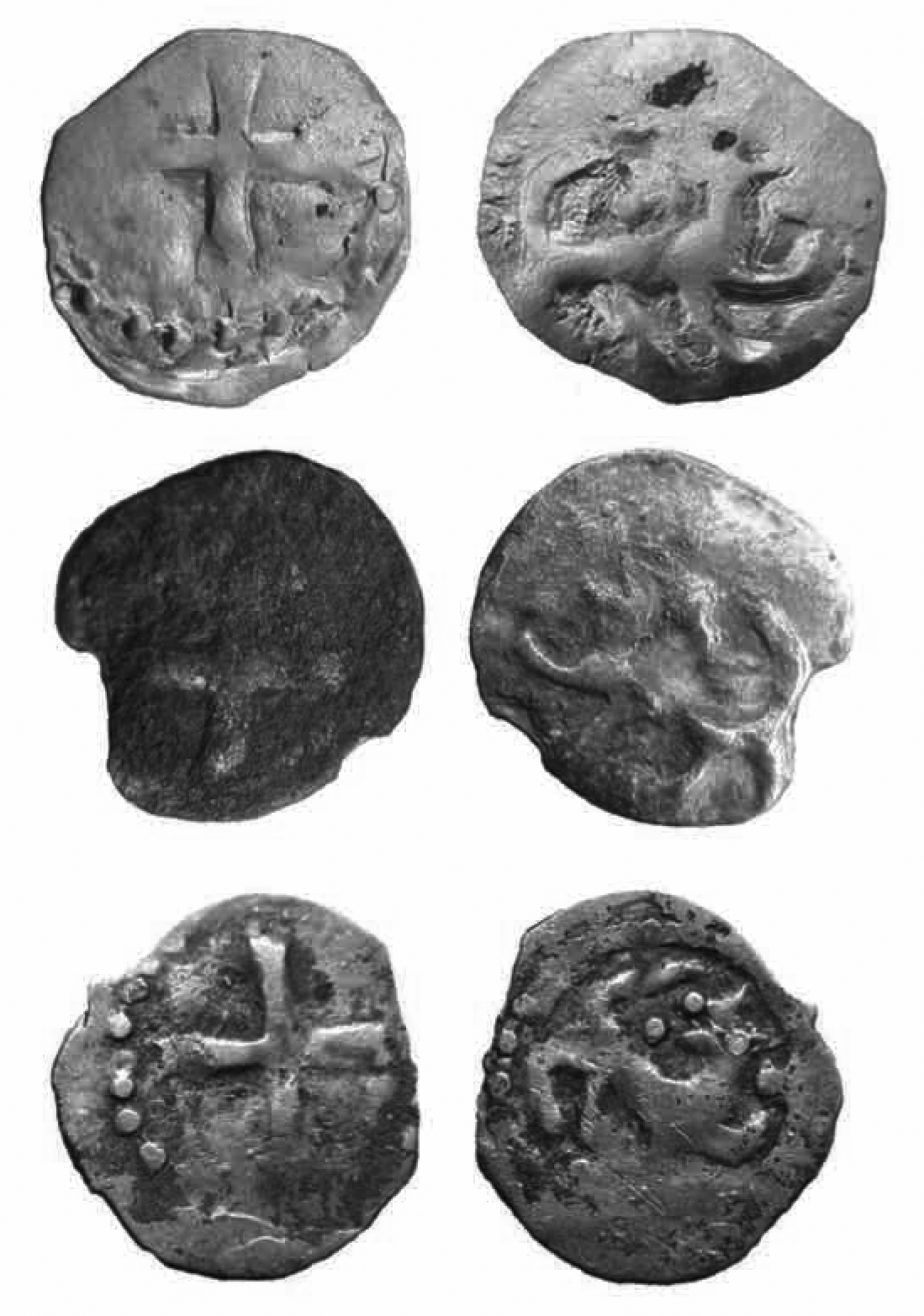
Coins of Liubartas and Fedor
Fourteenth century

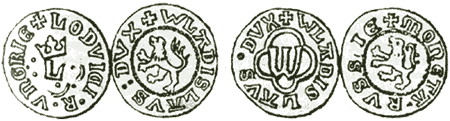
Vladislaus' penny
Fourteenth century

==== Lviv ====
The Ruthenian lion is depicted on the seal of Prince Wladyslaw of Opole, who ruled the territory of the former Ruthenian kingdom from 1372 to 1378 as "the hospodar and heir of the Ruthenian land." He was also the prince of the Greater Poland, which included Częstochowa. Around 1377, the city received a coat of arms, one of the elements of which was a figure of a Ruthenian coat of arms from the seal of Wladyslaw. Thus, the oldest surviving city seal of Częstochowa, which binds documents from 1564 and 1646, has an image of a city wall with three pointed towers, both of which are extremely high and crowned with two animals: the right, a lion in a jump facing left, and the left, an eagle facing right. The Ruthenian lion symbolizes the Ruthenian land, and the eagle symbolizes the Duchy of Opole, the possession of the Silesian Piasts. Both figures were depicted in gold on a blue background. At the same time, on the coat of arms of the city of Częstochowa, the Ruthenian lion occupies an honorable (right) place, because it represents the kingdom, while the Opole eagle is only a separate principality.

The Ruthenian lion as a symbol of belonging to Rus is found on the seals of Lviv from the fourteenth century. The oldest known city seal, attached to the parchment deed of the Lviv magistrate, dates back to 1359. It depicts a lion walking in the open gate of the city wall with three towers. In 1526, King Sigismund II of Poland officially approved this image as the coat of arms of the city.

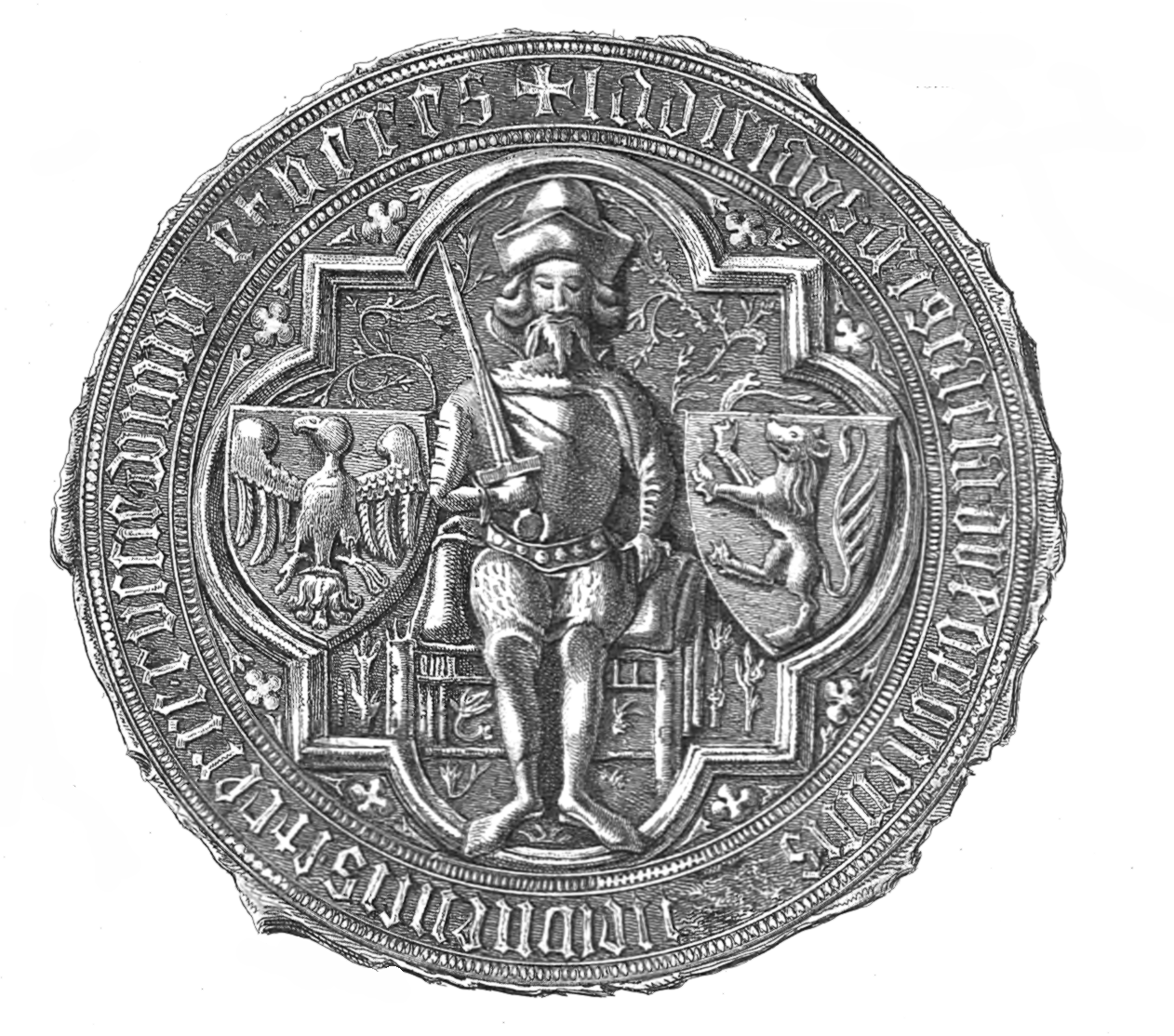
Seal of Vladislaus II of Opole
1379

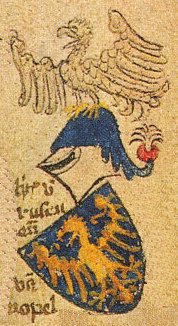
Emblem of Vladislaus II of Opole
1396

Częstochowa

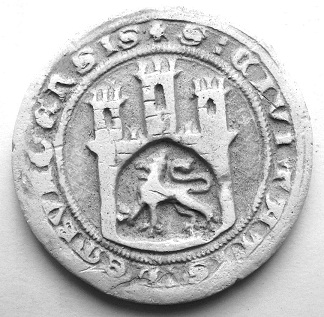
The seal of Lviv
1359

=== Rus 14th–16th centuries ===
On the seal of Polish King Władysław II Jagiełło from 1389, the Ruthenian lion is depicted as the lowest among all the land coats of arms of the kingdom: the Polish eagle, the Lithuanian pahonia, the Kalisz tour, the Sandomierz stars, the Kuyavian hybrid and the Dobrzyn head. On the coat of arms with a lion stands the royal throne, on which the king sits majestically. In later copies of this seal, the lion was sometimes depicted as leaning on a rock.

The first images of the Ruthenian lion in European coats of arms date back to the fifteenth century. In particular, it is present in the "Coat of Arms of the Golden Fleece" (1430–1461) in the group of coats of arms of the nobility of the Kingdom of Poland as the coat of arms of Rus, along with the coats of arms of Dobrzyń Land and Kuyaba. The coat of arms of the Lwów Land is a separate Ruthenian lion on a silver rock.

The lion as a symbol of all Rus – the former kingdom – is depicted on the large seal of King Alexander of Poland in 1504–1505. He appears next to the coats of arms of self-sufficient parts of his state – Poland (silver eagle), Lithuania (pahonia) and Prussia (black eagle). According to the location of the heraldic figures, Rus ranked third after Poland and Lithuania, ahead of Prussia. The same motif of the coat of arms is found on the large seal of Sigismund II Augustus in 1556. However, from the second half of the sixteenth century the Ruthenian lion and the Prussian eagle disappear from the royal seals, yielding only to the dualistic coat of arms of Poland and Lithuania.

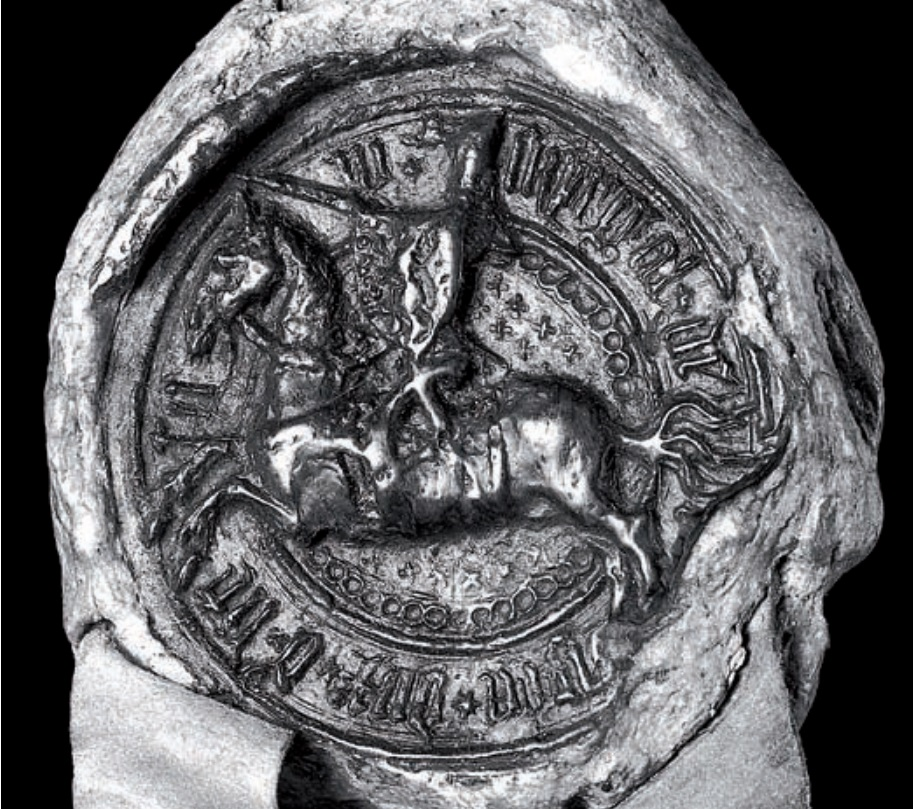
The seal of Skirgailal
1382

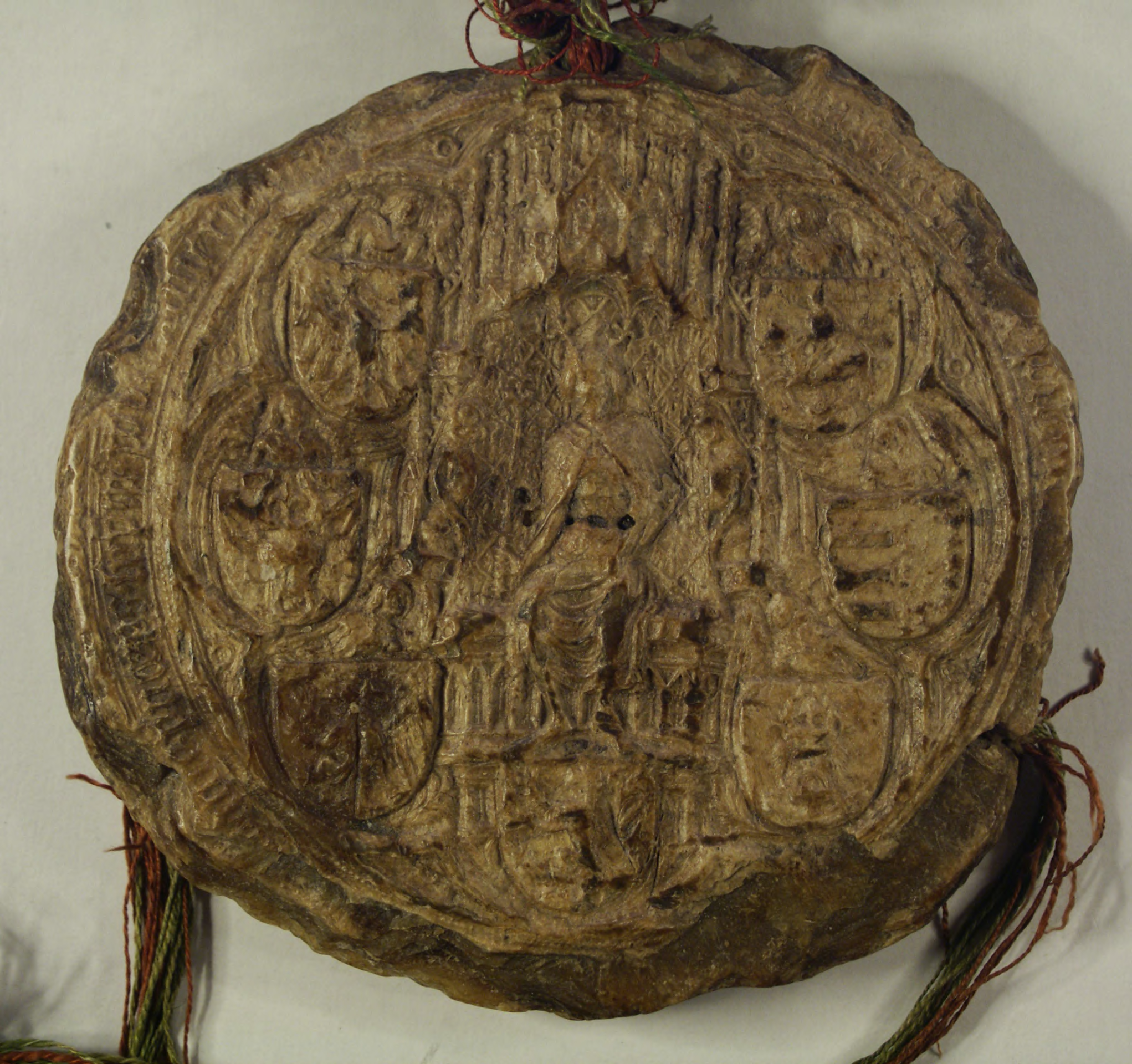
The seal of Jogaila
1389

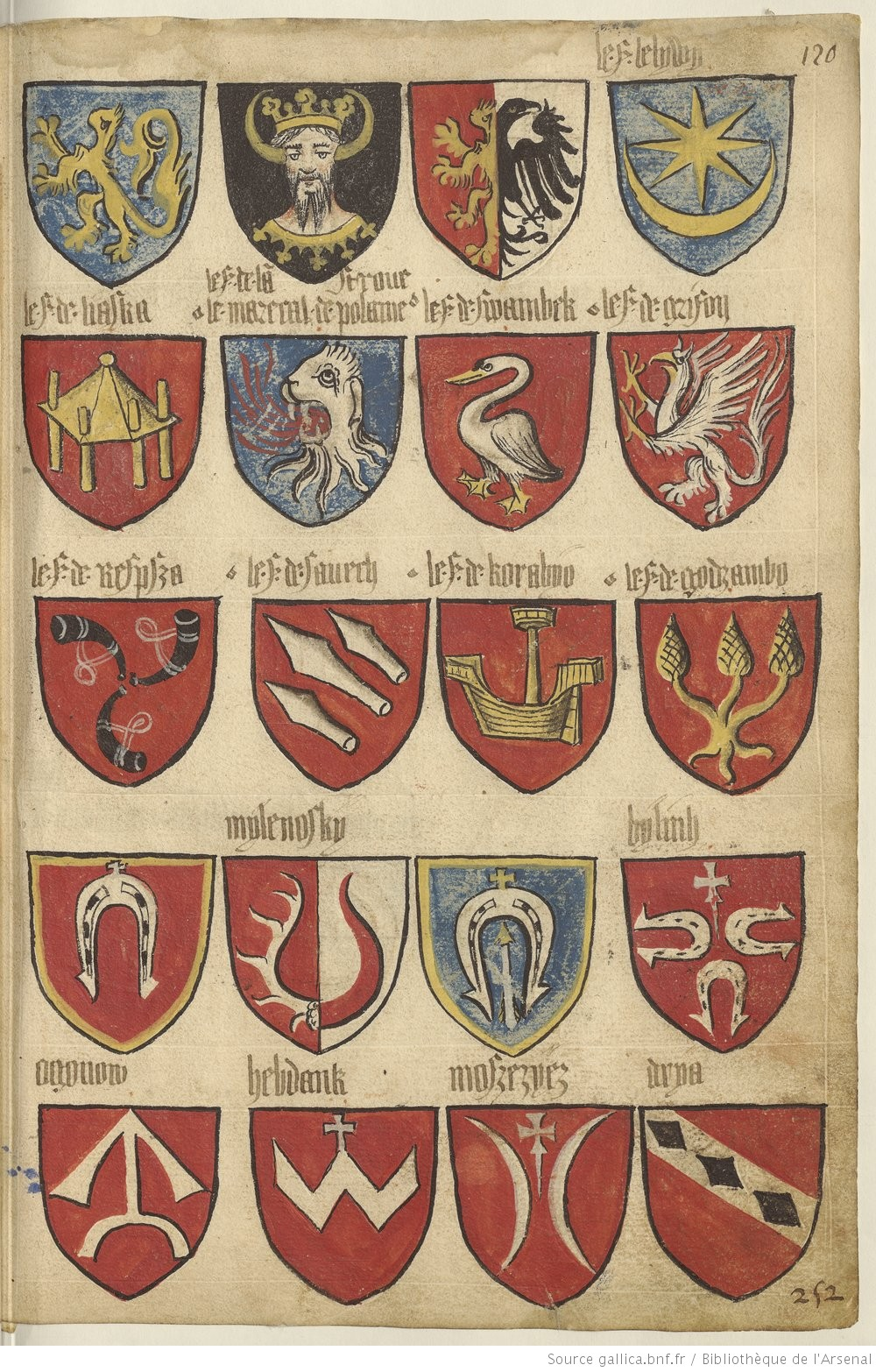
Rune coat of arms
Rus, 1430—1461

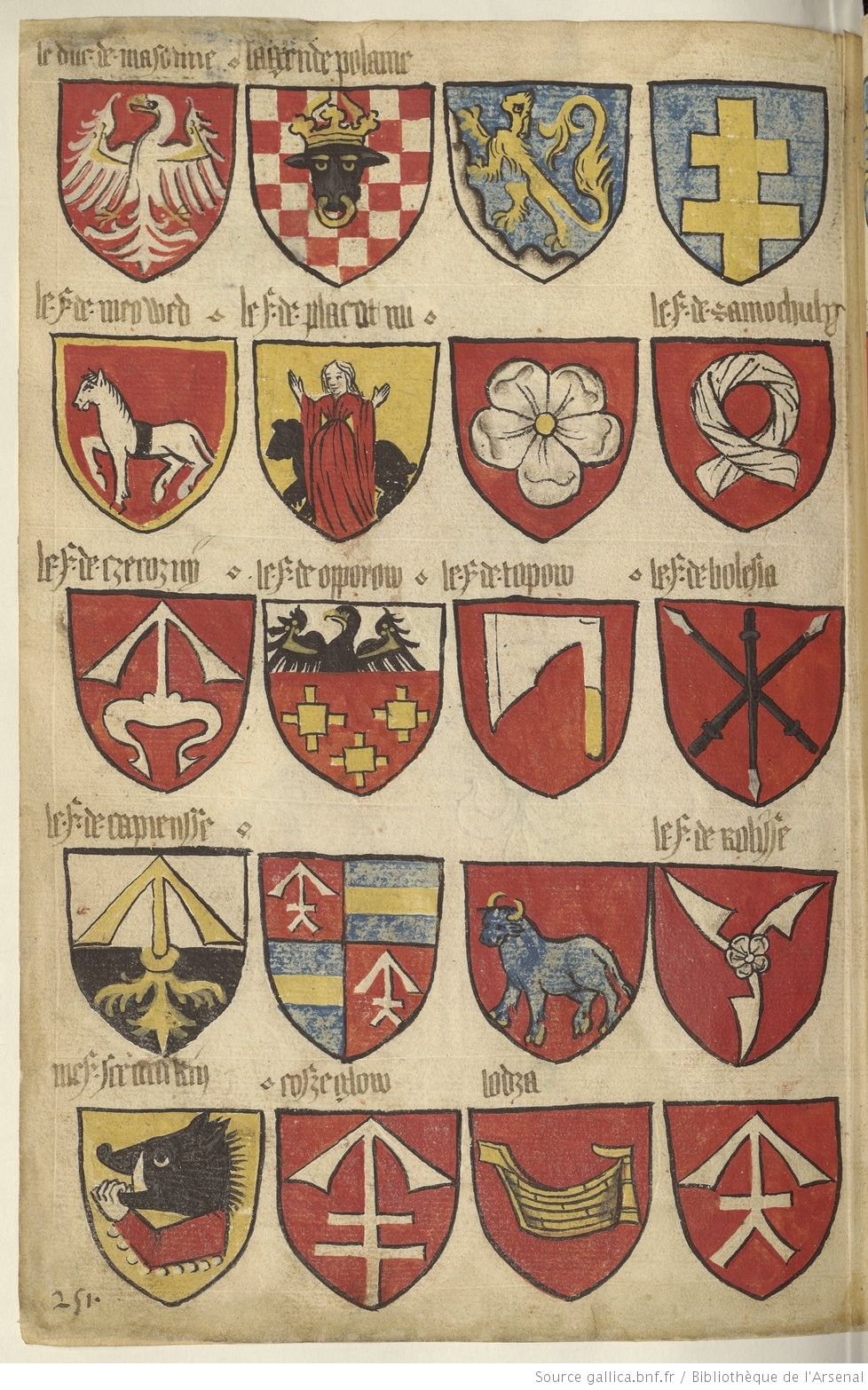
Rune coat of arms
Lwów Land, 1430—1461

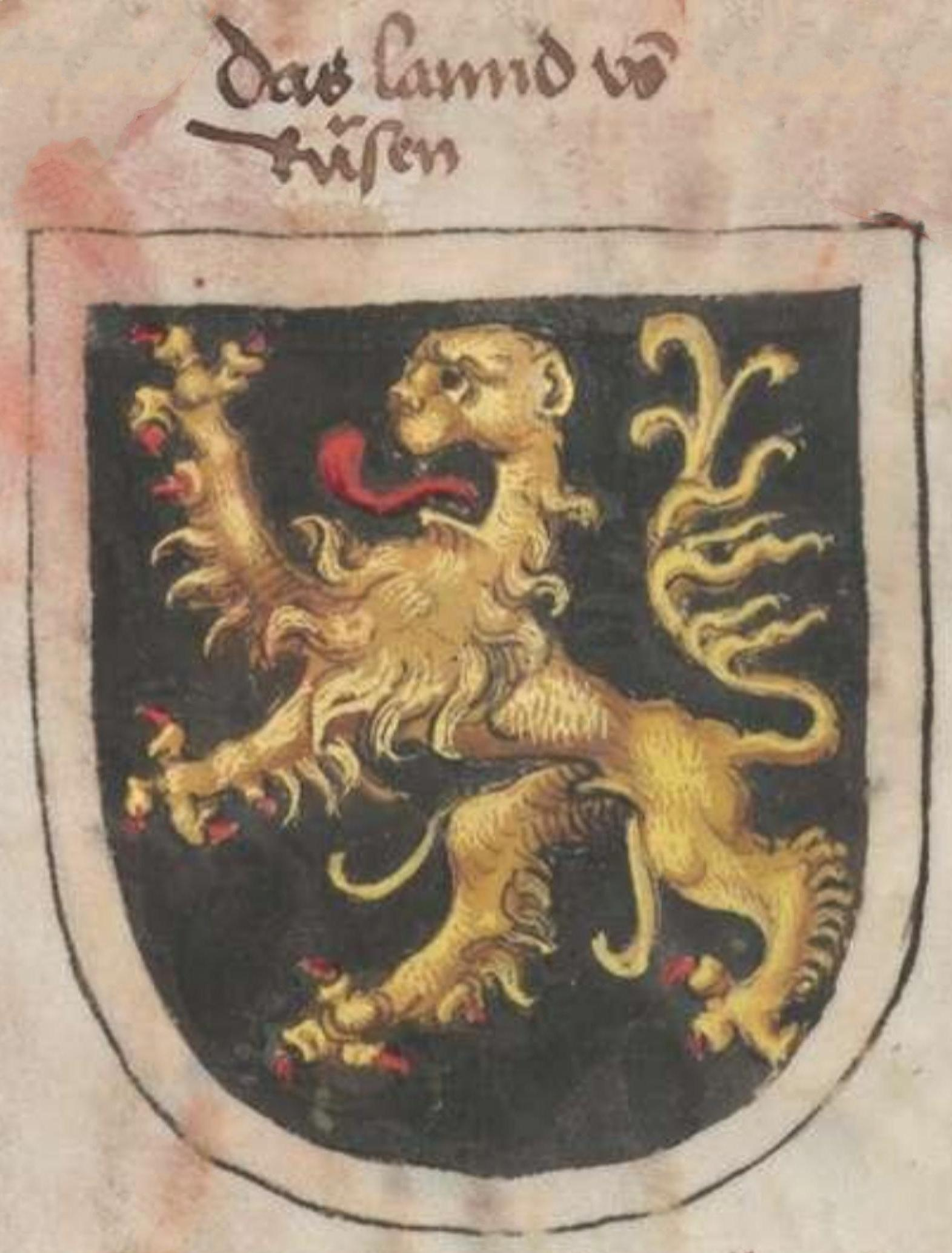
Heraldry of Conrad Grünenberg, 1480

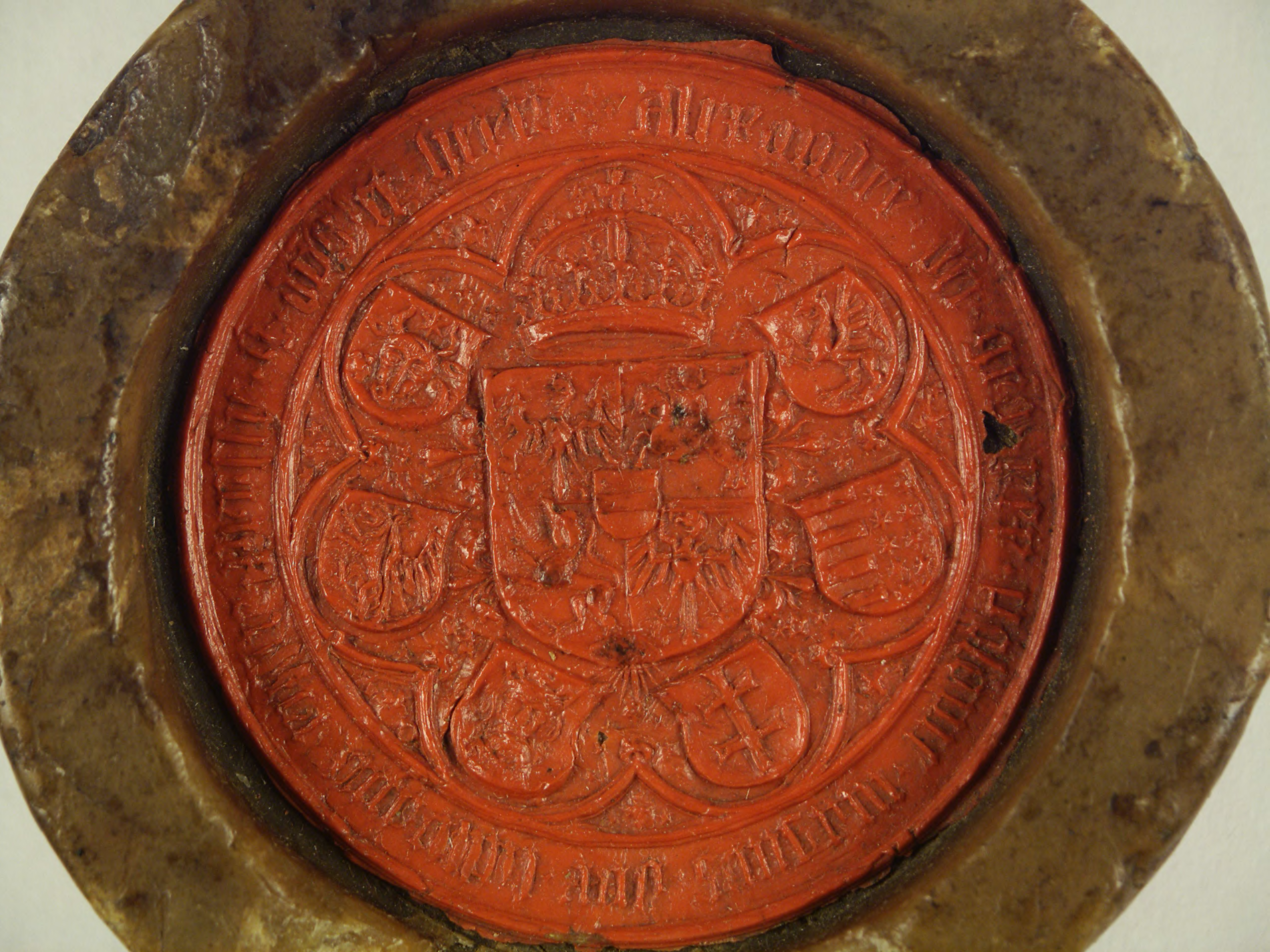
Alexander's seal
1505

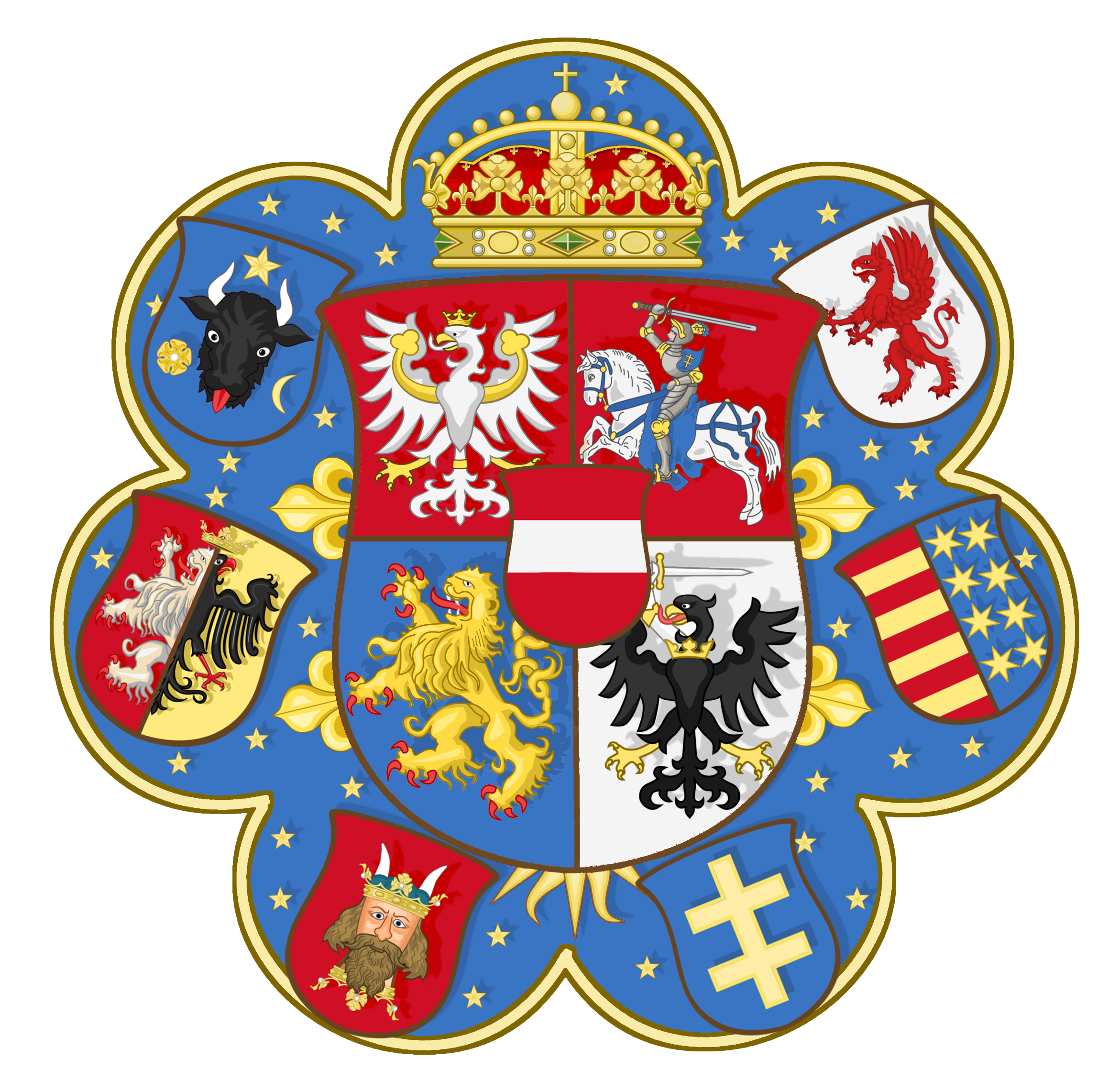
Coat of arms from the seal
1505

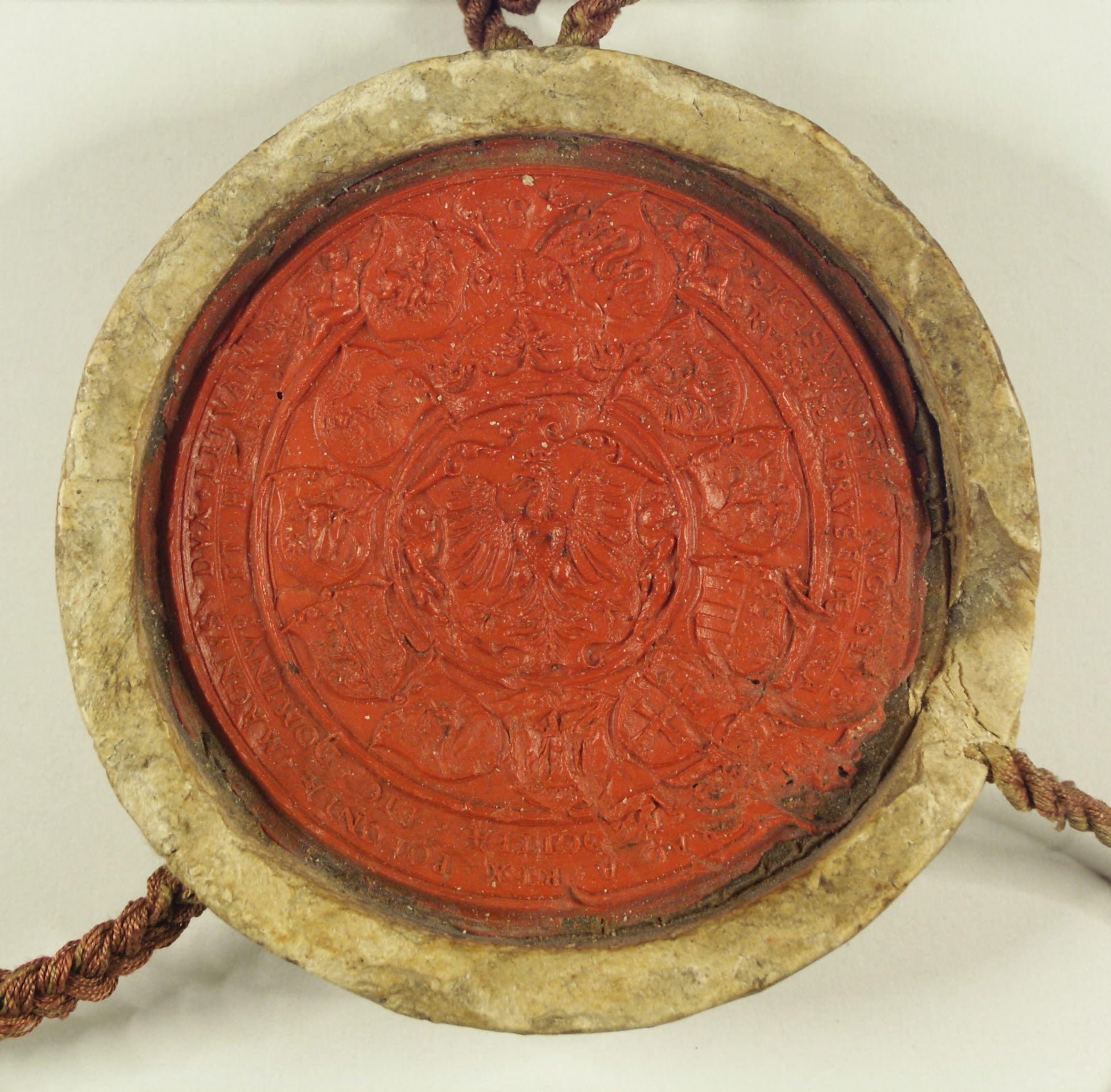
Seal of Sigismund II
1556

Conrad Grünenberg's coat of arms from 1480 depicts an unconventional Ruthenian lion next to a Lithuanian pahonia and a Polish eagle: a golden lion with red arms and a silver bordure in a black shield. Above the coat of arms is the signature in German: das lannd võ Rüsen, 'Ruthenian land'. At the beginning of the seventeenth century. a copy of this coat of arms was made by Georg Ortenburg, in which the lion had golden claws, a red tongue and silver teeth.

The motif with a Ruthenian lion is depicted on a miniature of the sixteenth century, which depicts the East Pomeranian prince Sviatopolk II and his wives. One of them – Salome-Euphrosyne, daughter of the Kiev prince Roman the Great and sister of the Ruthenian king Daniel, holds the coat of arms in the form of a golden lion on a blue background, which is going to the silver moore.

The Ruthenian flame lion is present on the triptych of the Babenberg family (1492), on one of the coats of arms of the Austrian Duchess Gertrude, the wife of the Ruthenian prince Roman, the son of King Daniel (along with the Austrian, Baden, Moravian and Styrian coats of arms).

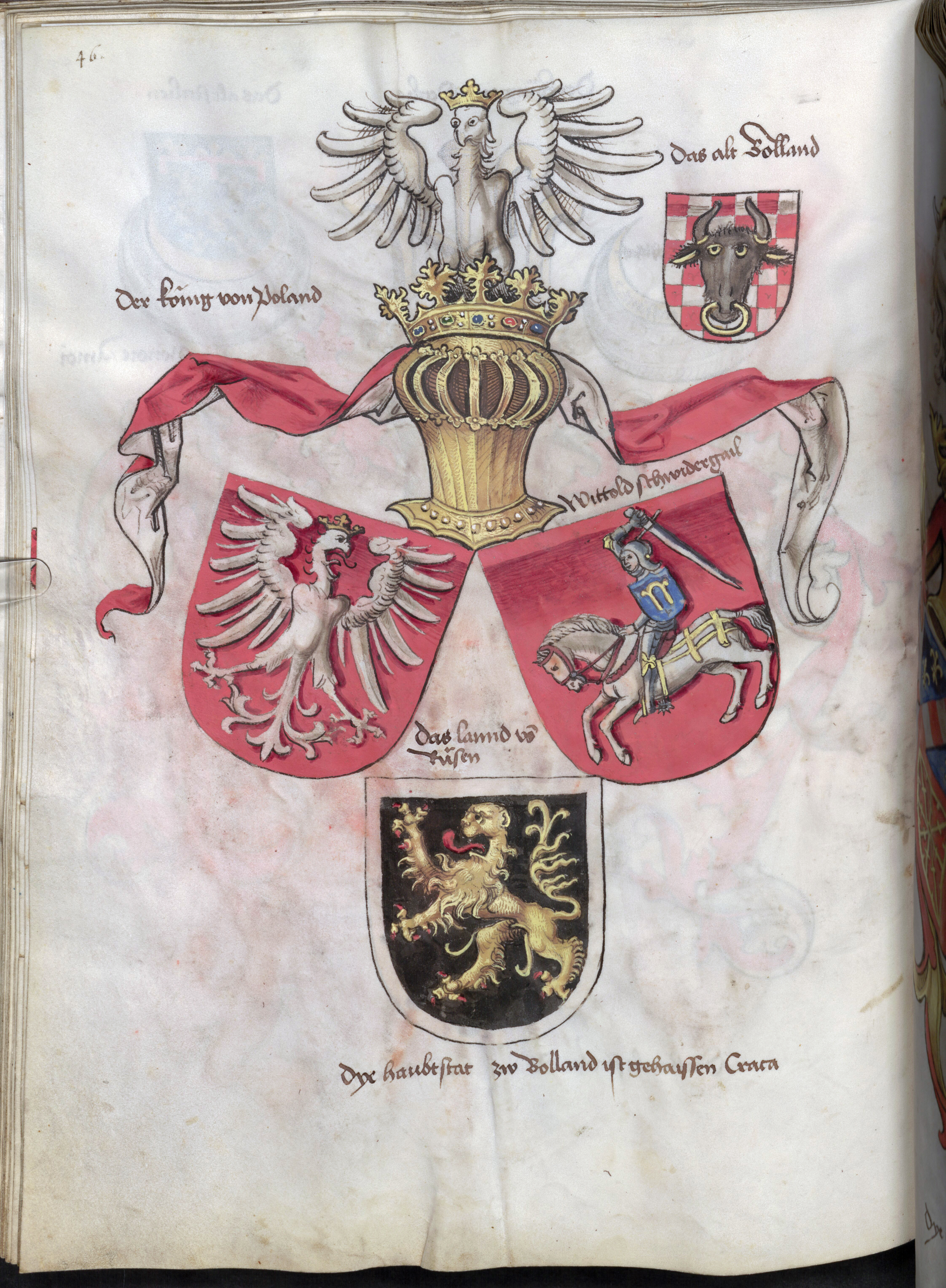
Grünenberg
1480

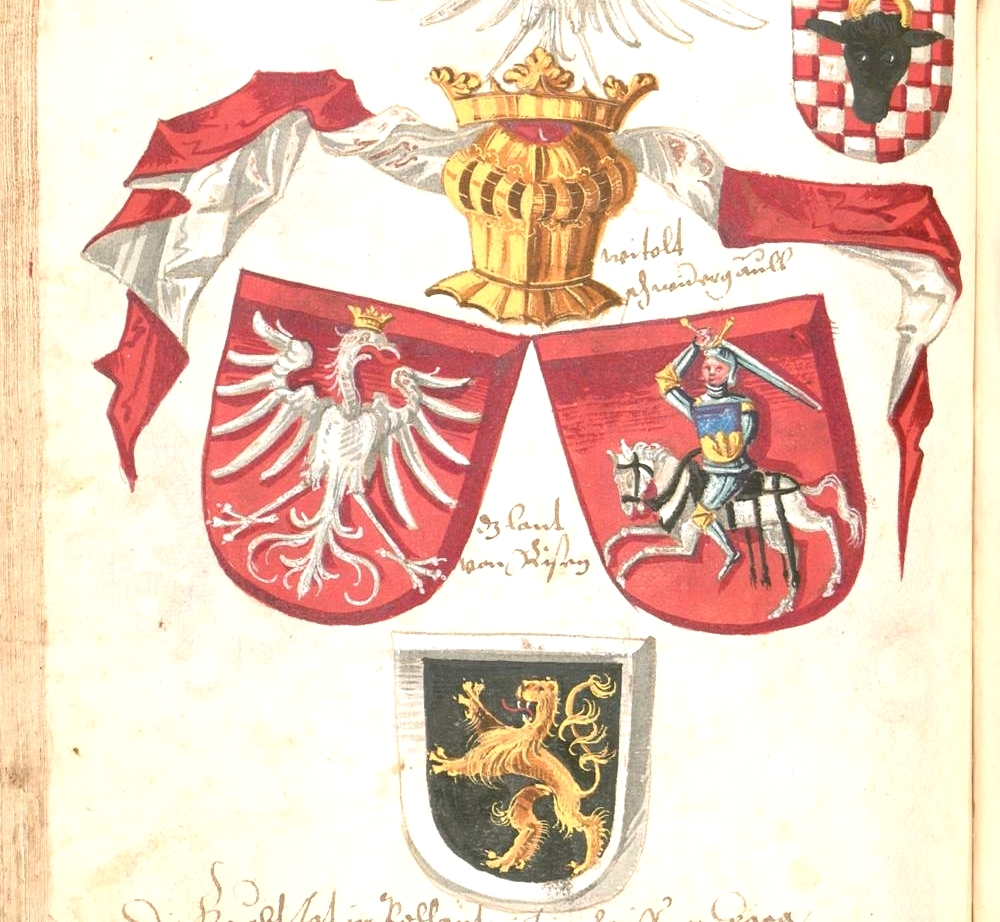
Ortenburg
1604

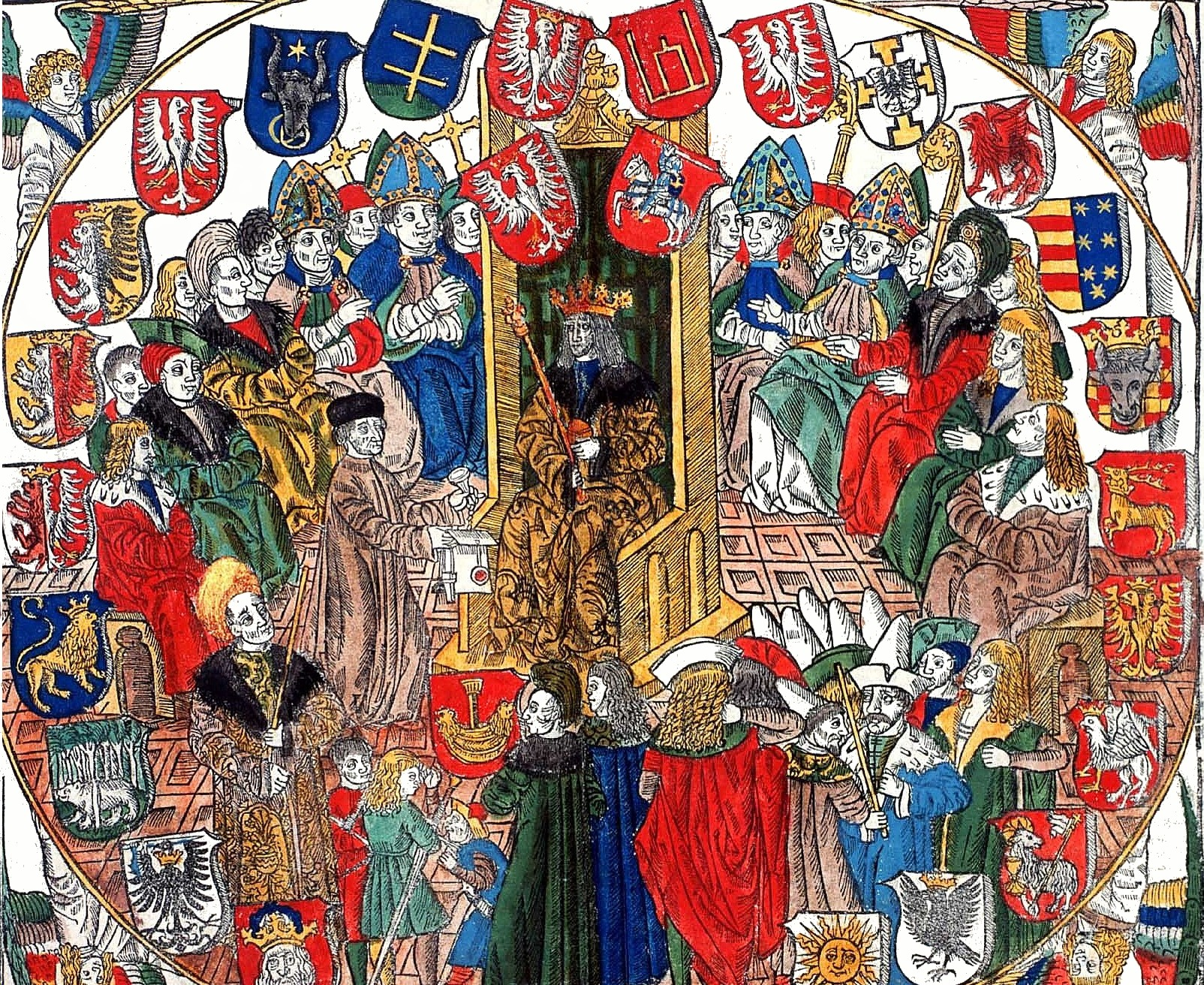
Statute
1506

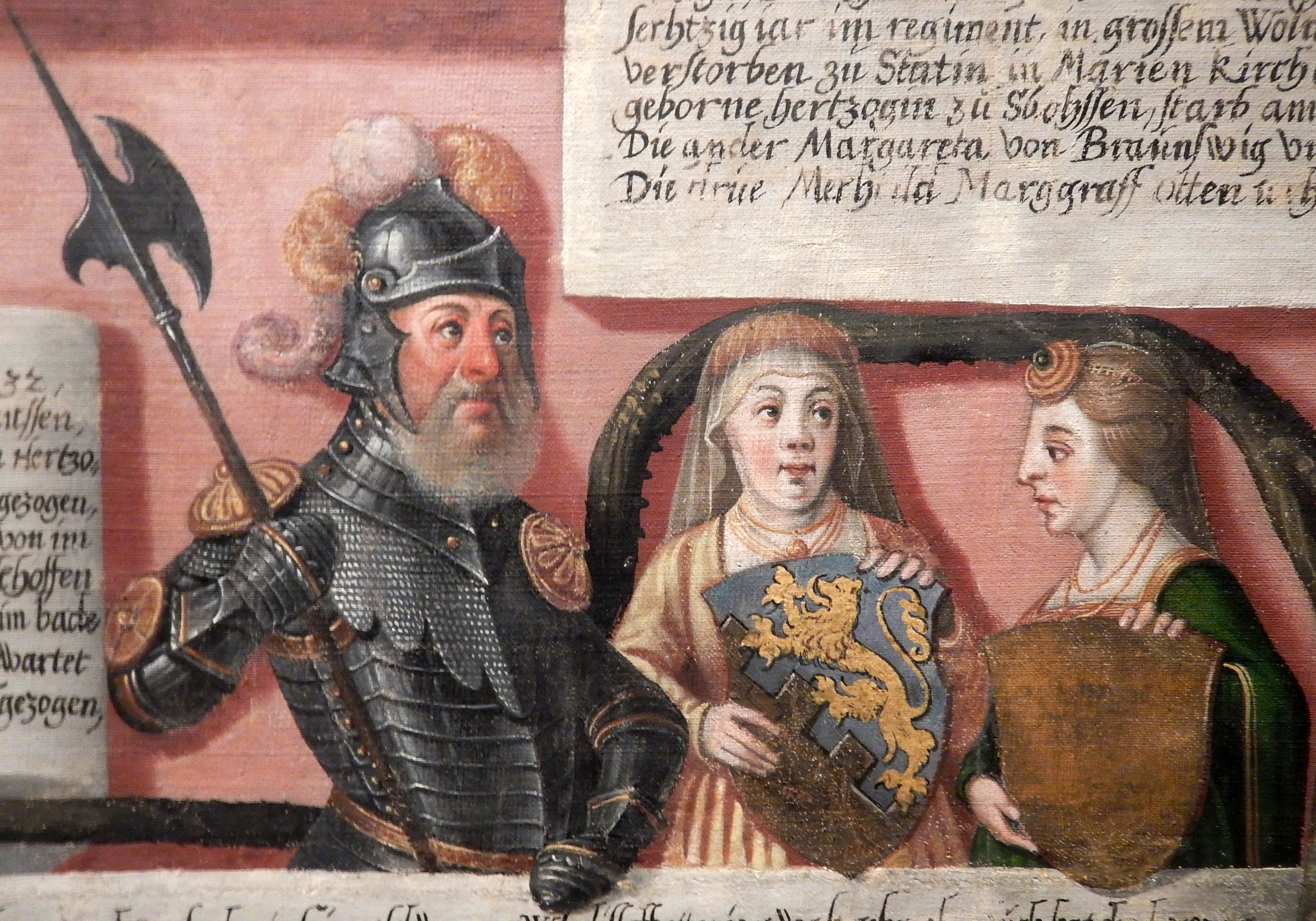
Sviatopolk II and Salome
Sixteenth century

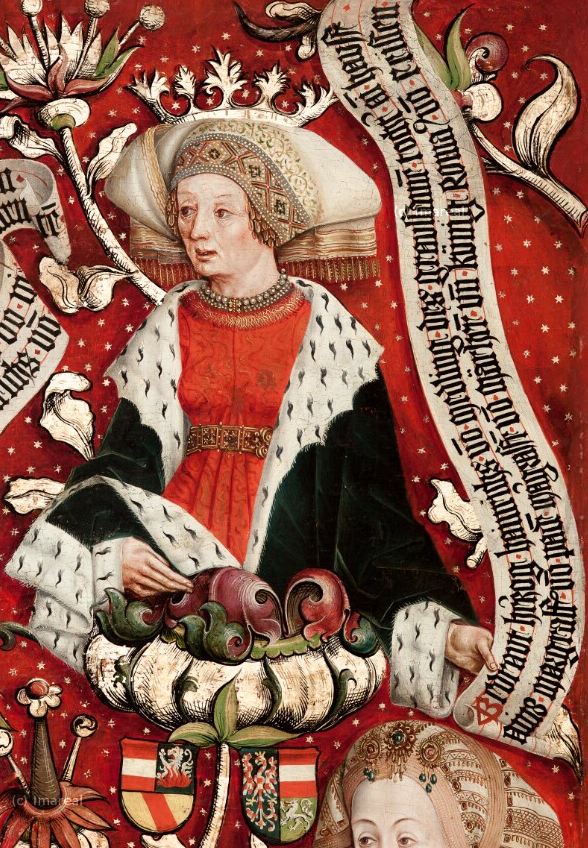
Gertrude
Fifteenth century

=== Lwów Land and Ruthenian Voivodeship ===
A slightly modified Ruthenian lion – the voivodeship emblem of the Lwów Land in the form of a lion rising on a silver rock – has been known since 1410. He is mentioned by the Polish chronicler and archbishop of Lviv Jan Dlugosz in the description of the banner of the Lviv banner, which took part on the side of Polish King Władysław II Jagiełło in the Battle of Grunwald. After the formation of the Ruthenian Voivodeship in 1434, this land coat of arms of the Lwów Land became the voivodeship coat of arms and a symbol of Halychyna (despite the fact that the Halych land had its own land coat of arms with a jackdaw).

The Ruthenian lion on the rock was used as the official emblem of the Ruthenian voivodeship until 1772, before the second division of Poland, and was often called the Halychynian lion. Along with it, until the sixteenth century, the old traditional image of the Ruthenian lion on the blue shield was used as the land and voivodeship coat of arms, as evidenced by the miniatures on Łaski's Statute of 1506.

Lwów Land
1410

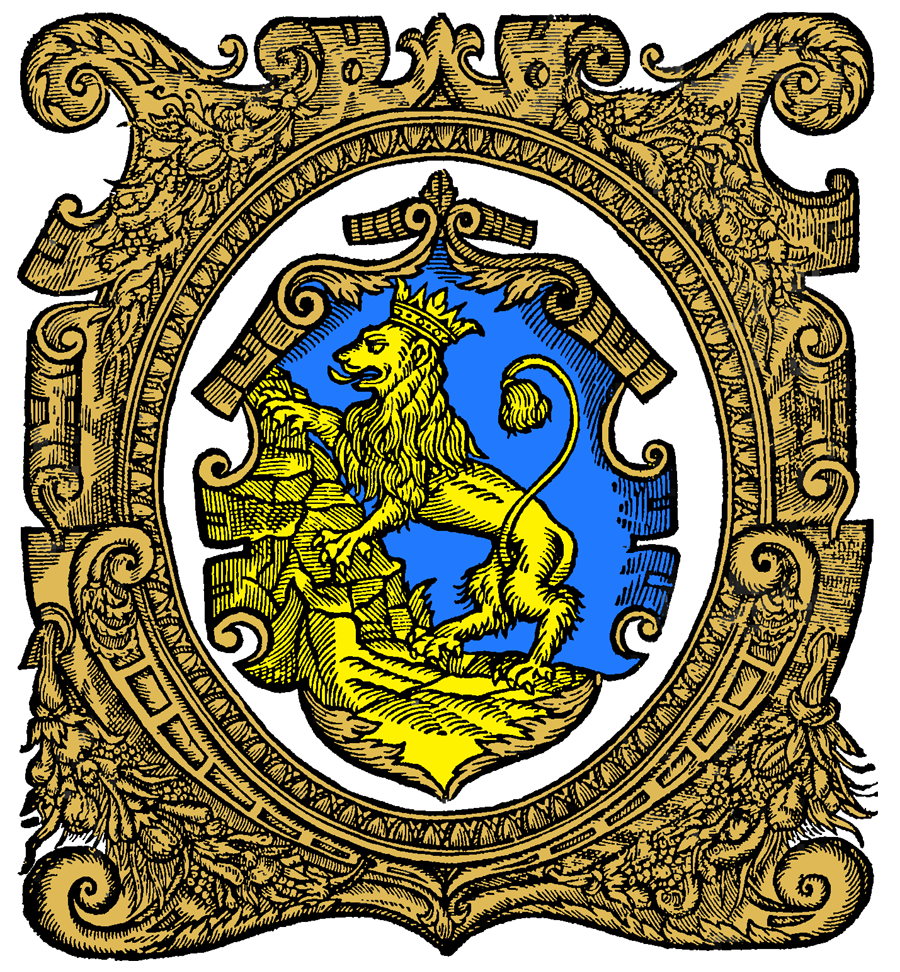
Lwów Land
1578

Ruthenian Voivodeship
1597

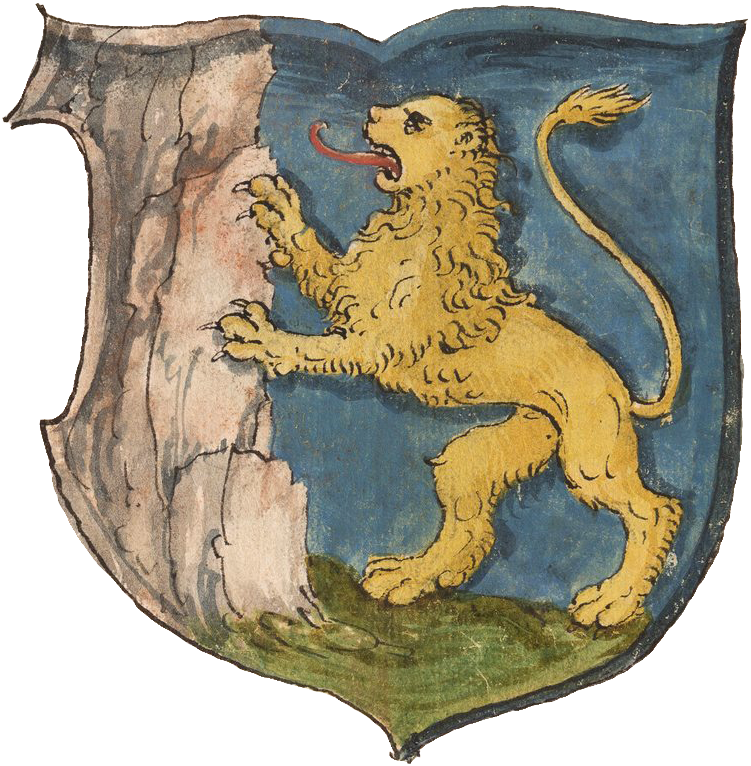
Ruthenian Voivodeship
Seventeenth century

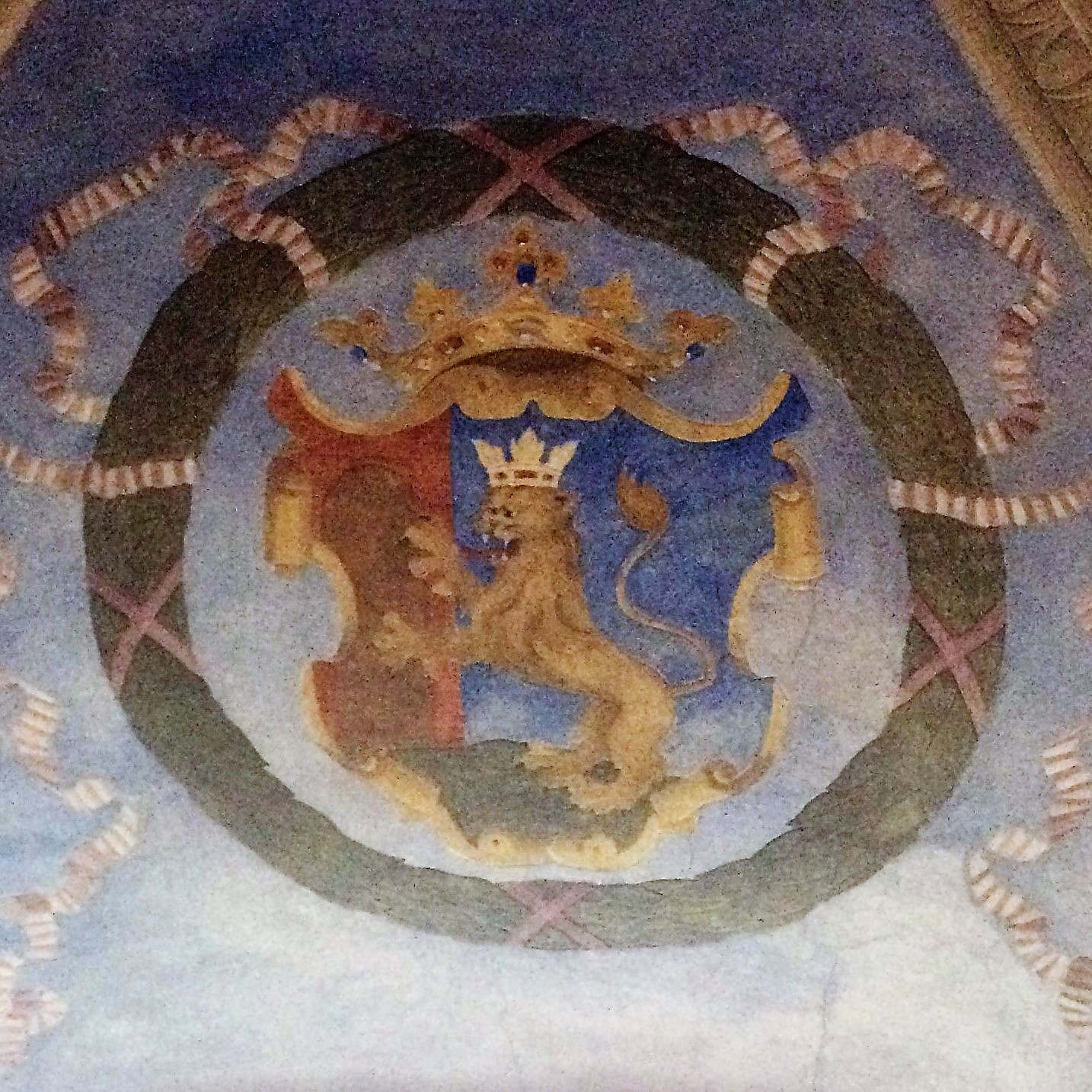
Ruthenian Voivodeship
Warsaw, seventeenth century

Ruthenian Voivodeship
1743

=== Austrian Empire ===
==== Revolution of 1848 ====
National Ruthenian colors based on the colors of the coat of arms with a Ruthenian lion.

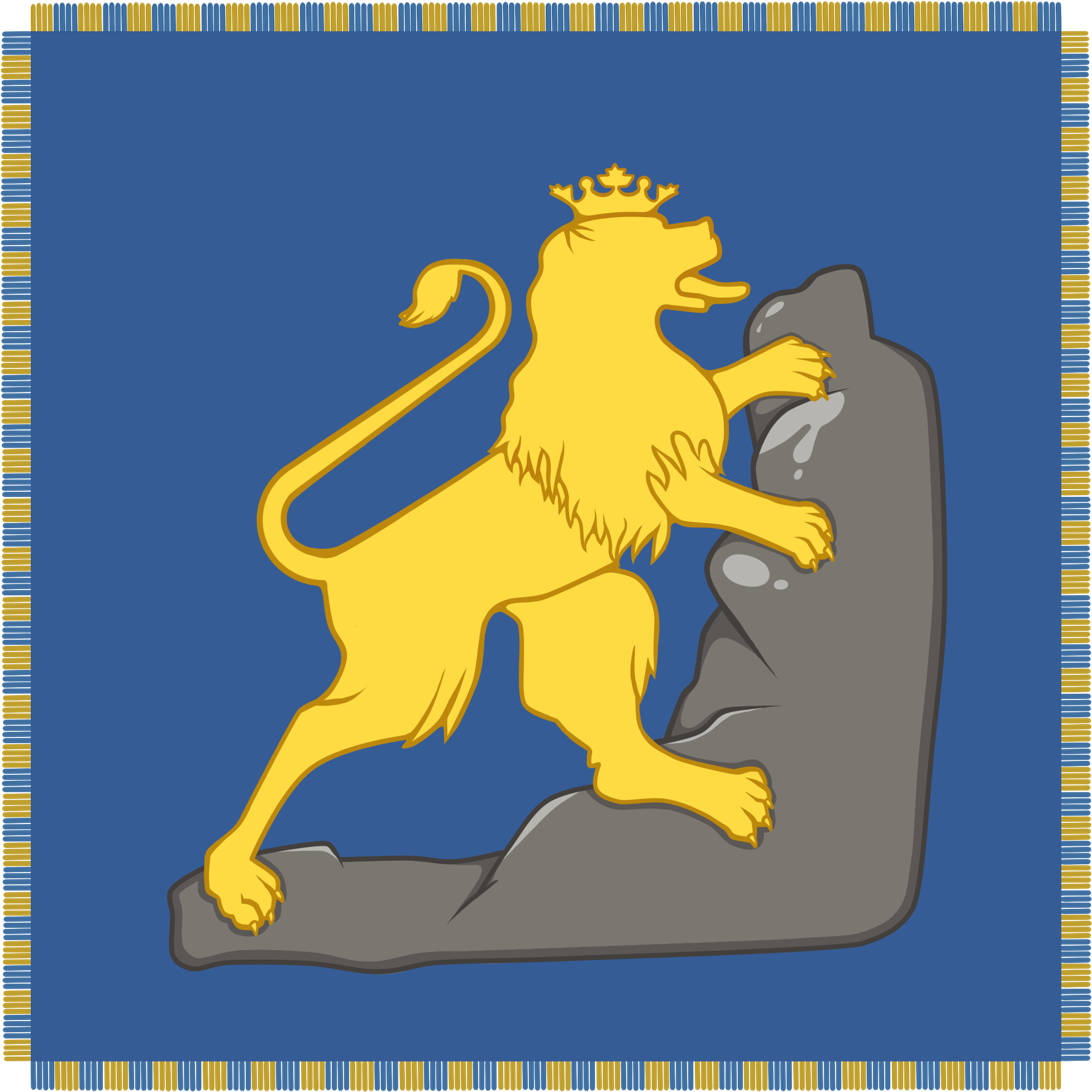
Flag of the Ruthenian Guard

During the Revolution in the Austrian Empire in 1848, the Supreme Ruthenian Council was established in Lviv. In May, she issued a manifesto to the Ruthenian (Ukrainian) population of the region and chose the Ruthenian lion as a symbol of the national liberation movement. The manifesto stated:

Браття! сини так великої руської родини, малибисьмо самі одні на світі позістати і на даль в тім нещаснім замертвінню? Ні! Пробудил ся уже й наш лев руский і красну нам ворожить пришлість. Вставайтеж Браття, вставайте з долгого сну вашого, бо уже час! Встаньте! але не до звади і незгоди! но двигнімся разом, щоби піднести народність нашу і забезпечити дані нам свободи. Пожиткуймо з тої спосібности, абисьмо не покрили ся ганьбою перед світом і не стягнули на себе нарікання поколінь наступних. Поступаймо з другими народами в любві і згоді! Будьмо тим, чим бити можем і повиннисьмо. Будьмо народом!

Brothers! sons of such a great Ruthenian family, should we have remained alone in the world and far away in that unfortunate death? No! Our Ruthenian lion has already woken up and the future is promising for us. Get up, brothers, get up from your long sleep, because it's time! Get up! but not to strife and disagreement! but let's move together to elevate our nationality and ensure the freedoms given to us. Let's make a living from that method, so that we don't cover ourselves with shame in front of the world and don't bring upon ourselves the complaints of future generations. Let's act with other peoples in love and harmony! Let's be what we can and must beat. Let's be a people!

The minutes of the secret meetings of the Council of May 18, 1848, indicated that the Council decided the flag of the Ruthenian land of the Ruthenian lion, and the national Ruthenian (Ukrainian) colors – yellow and blue:

It is important to send a letter to Stanislau with instructions to print it soon and say that the banner of the Ruthenian land is a lion, and the Ruthenian colors are yellow and blue.

During the revolution, Vasyl Ilnytskyi, a school counselor and director of the Lviv Academic Gymnasium, recalled in his memoirs the extraordinary uplift caused by Hryhorii Shashkevych's speech in Stanislau, which was topped by the words: "And the Ruthenian lion shakes his golden mane with indignation."

The Main Ruthenian Council also formed the Ruthenian National Guard, whose flag was a blue cloth with a golden lion.

==== Organizations ====
The Ruthenian lion was one of the symbols of the Ukrainian Sokil sports club in Lviv. The organization's charter of 1892, which was approved by the Ministry of the Interior in Vienna on July 26, 1893, and the Galician Governorate on August 3 of the same year, stated that: "the banner of the society is a Ruthenian lion, the call 'cheer up'". This was confirmed in subsequent statutes. On May 30, 1911, the Sokol magazine reported that the society had received a flag from a French factory: on one side, on a blue background, was a golden crowned lion resting its paws on a yellow rock, and on the other, St. Michael with a lowered sword in his right hand and a scabbard in the left on a crimson background.

==== Ukrainian Sich Riflemen ====
On August 6, 1914, after the outbreak of the World War I, the Ukrainian national military formation, the Ukrainian Sich Riflemen (USS), was formed as part of the Austro-Hungarian army. The arches of the archers were adorned with Ruthenian lions rising on a rock – the old coat of arms of the Lviv land, and on the flag – the holy archangel Michael with a shield on which was painted the royal Ruthenian lion.

In 2018, a monument to the heroes of the November Order in the form of a Ruthenian lion was unveiled in Lviv – an allegorical image of young soldiers who shed blood for independent Ukraine.

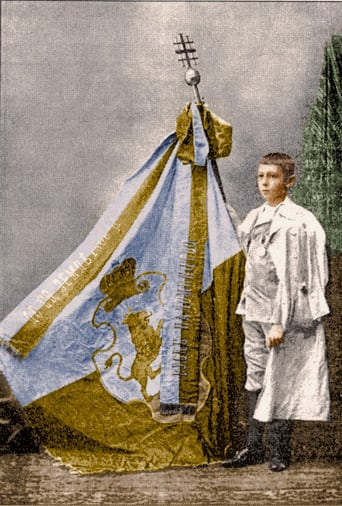
Pilgrimage flag
1907

USR cockade
1914

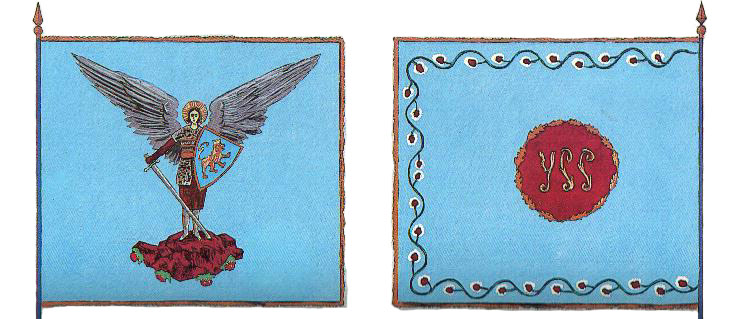
USR flag

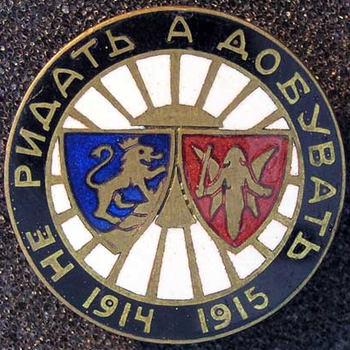
USR icon
1914

=== Western Ukrainian People's Republic ===
On November 13, 1918, the Ruthenian lion was approved by the coat of arms of the Western Ukrainian People's Republic (WUPR). In particular, the "Provisional Basic Law on the State Independence of the Ukrainian Lands of the Former Austro-Hungarian Monarchy" stated that: "The coat of arms of the Western Ukrainian People's Republic is: The Golden Lion on a blue field, turned to its right." However, after the Unification Act on January 22, 1919, with the Ukrainian People's Republic, the Ruthenian lion gave way to the trident in Halychyna.

WUPR
1918

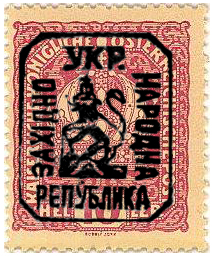
WUPR seal
1918

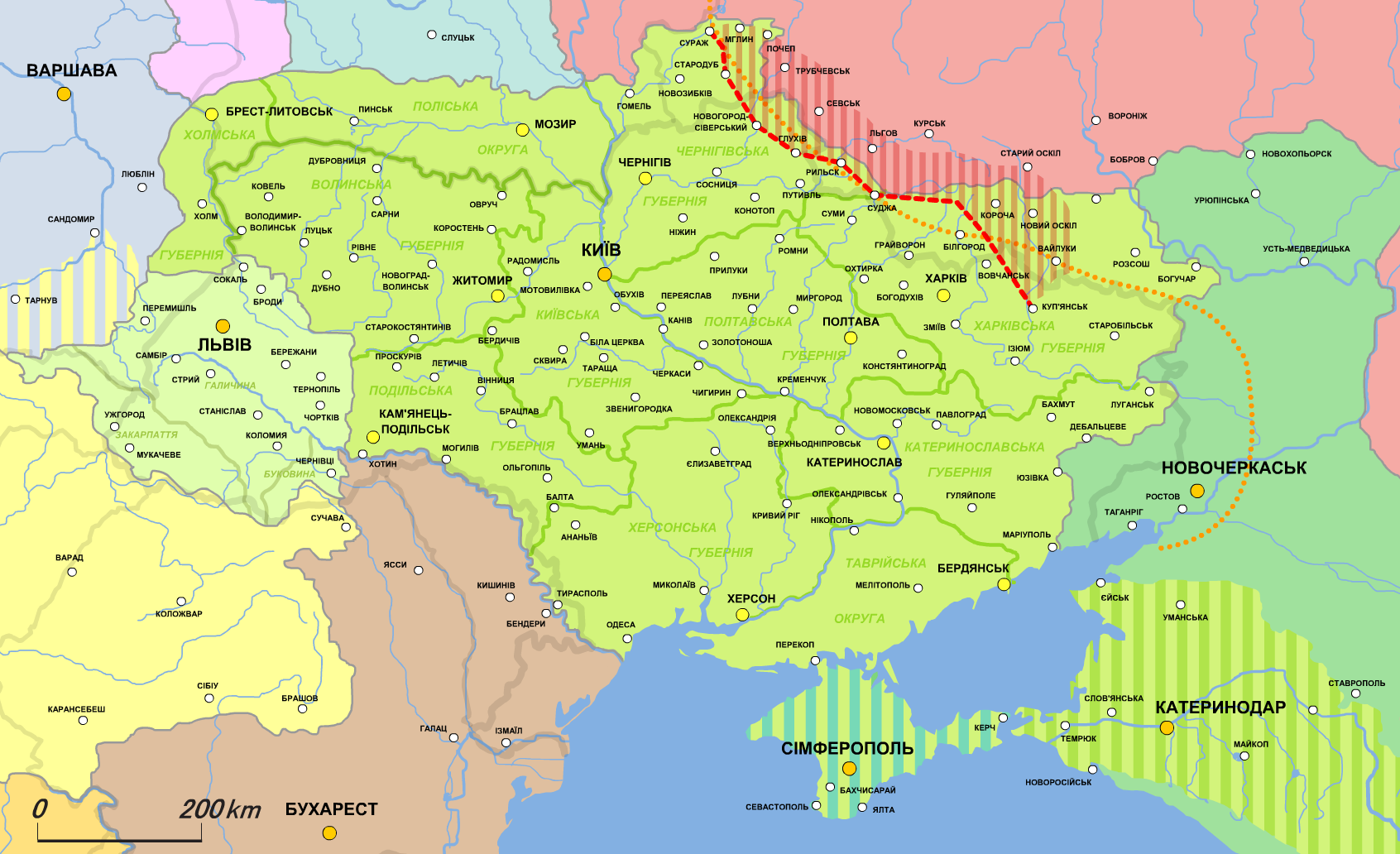
Ukraine
1918

UPR
1918

There is no side coat of arms in the coat of arms of the Western Ukrainian People's Republic – a rock on which a lion rests. According to Roman Klymkevych, this rock was a "historically unfounded" extension of the coat of arms, a consequence of the transition of Red Rus under Polish rule. The law of the Western Ukrainian People's Republic cleared the coat of arms of unnecessary "foreign influences, recreated its ancient state form."

=== Second World War ===
During the Second World War, the Ruthenian lion became the emblem of the 14th Waffen Grenadier Division of the SS (1st Galician), created in 1943 from Halychynian Ukrainians. This symbol was considered regional, Halychynian, and was chosen because the German authorities officially banned the national Ukrainian symbol – the trident – and did not want to emphasize the Ukrainianness of the formation. In addition to the lion, the divisional coat of arms had additions in the form of three crowns – figures from the coat of arms of the Kingdom of Galicia and Lodomeria during the Austrian Empire (1782–1914). Soldiers and officers of the Galicia Division wore a stripe with the division's coat of arms on their sleeves. They also had the image of a silver Ruthenian lion on the gorget patches instead of the two lightning runes that only members of the Germanic peoples were allowed to wear.

Since the beginning of the twenty-first century, the coat of arms of the Galicia Division has sometimes been used as a symbol by Lviv football fans.

Emblem

Stripe

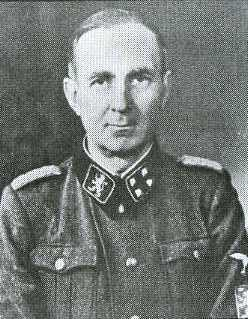
Major with a buttonhole

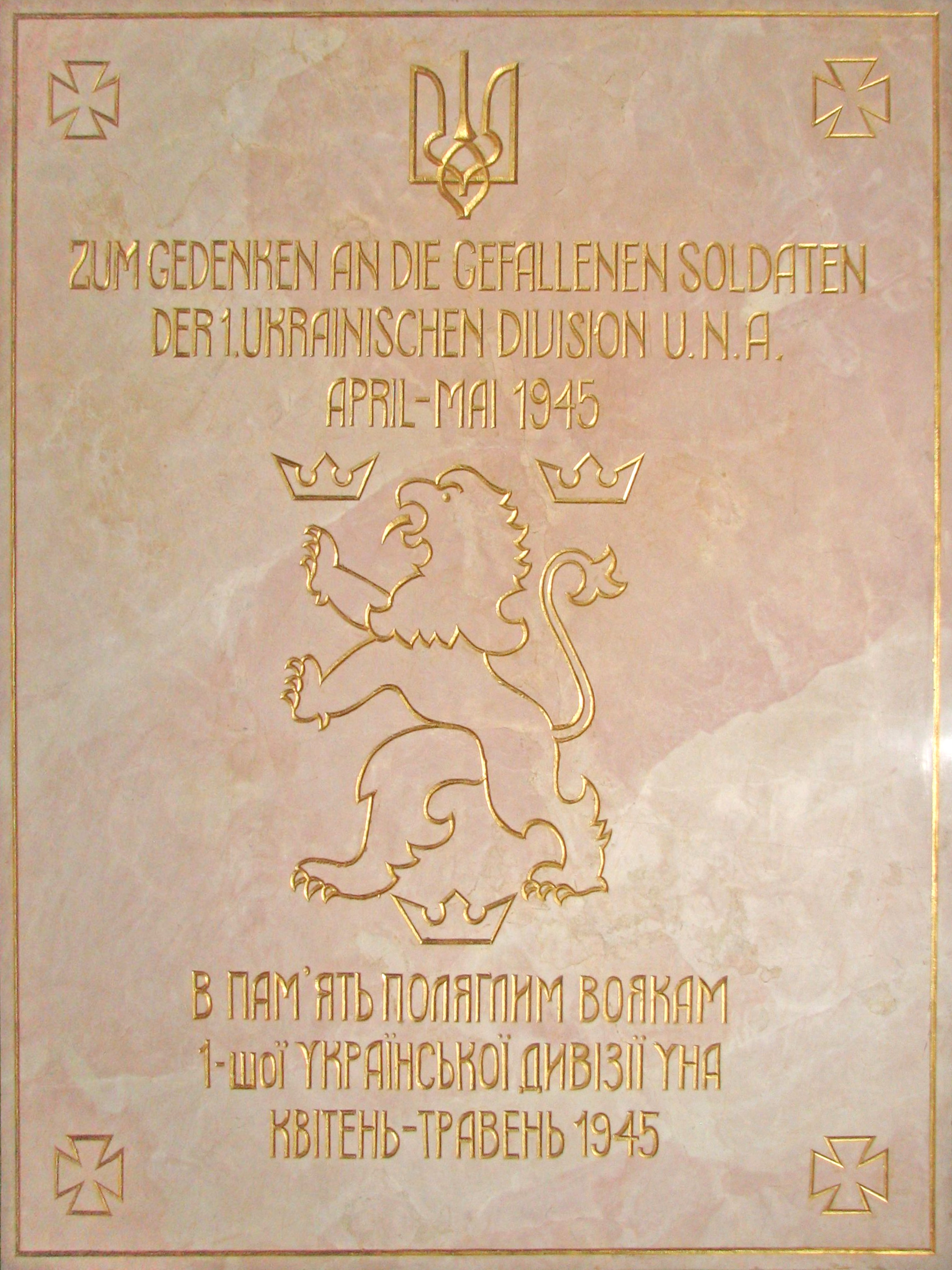
Commemorative sign

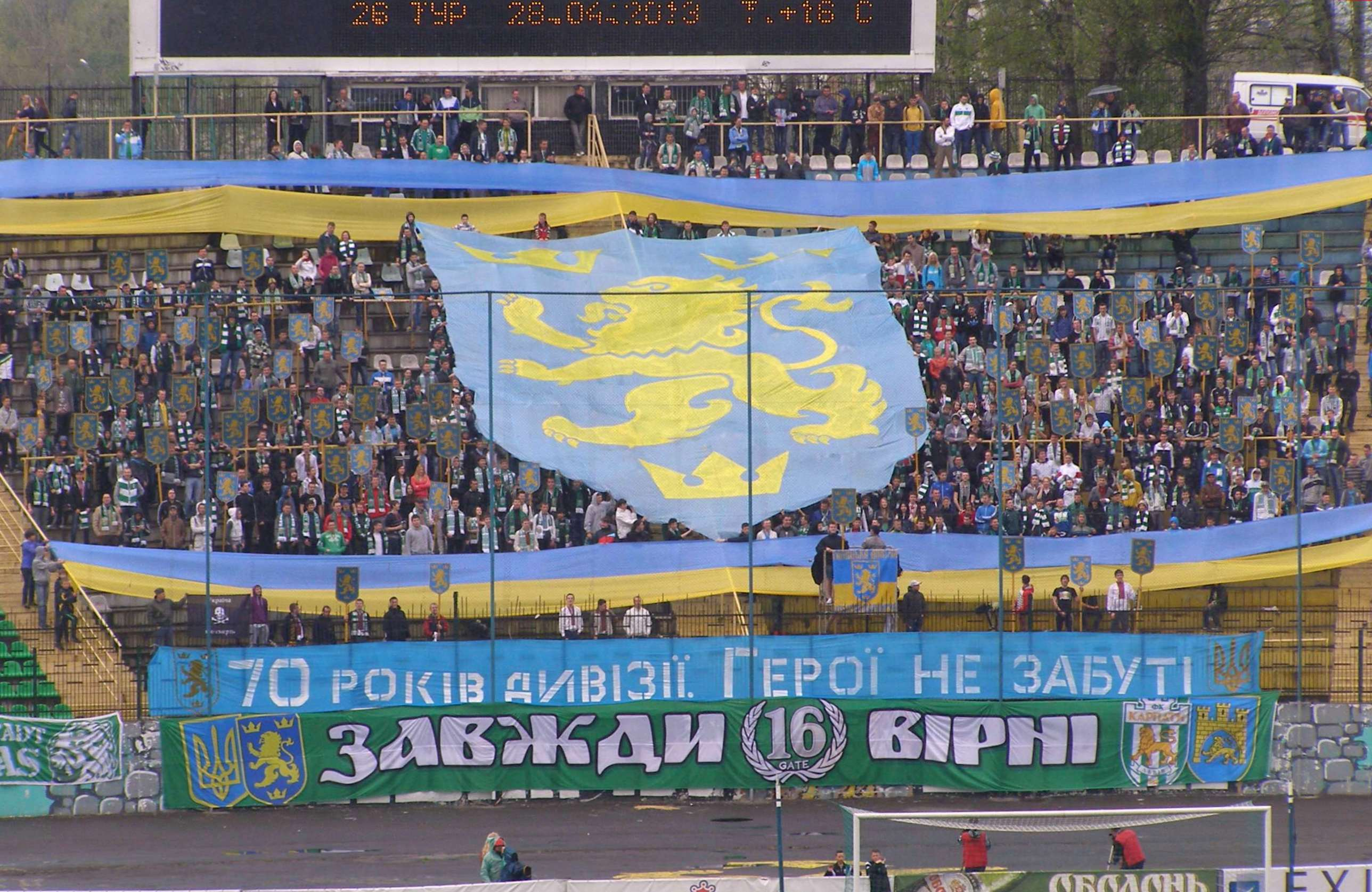
Banner on football

=== Ukraine ===
- On July 5, 1990, the session of the Lviv City Council approved the modern coat of arms of Lviv with a walking Ruthenian golden lion, the old city coat of arms from the fourteenth century.
- On February 27, 2001, the Lviv Oblast Council approved the coat of arms of Lviv Oblast with the image of a crowned Ruthenian lion perched on a rock – the Polish coat of arms of the Lwów Land and the Ruthenian Voivodeship from the fifteenth century.
- On May 8, 2003, the Zhydachiv Raion Council approved the coat of arms of Zhydachiv Raion with three walking golden lions, the Polish coat of arms of the powiat from 1676.
- On July 15, 2009, the Cabinet of Ministers of Ukraine approved the draft of the large state emblem of Ukraine. It included an image of a small coat of arms – a trident – in the center, held by supporters – a Ruthenian lion and the Cossack with musket.
Lviv
1990

Lviv Oblast
2001

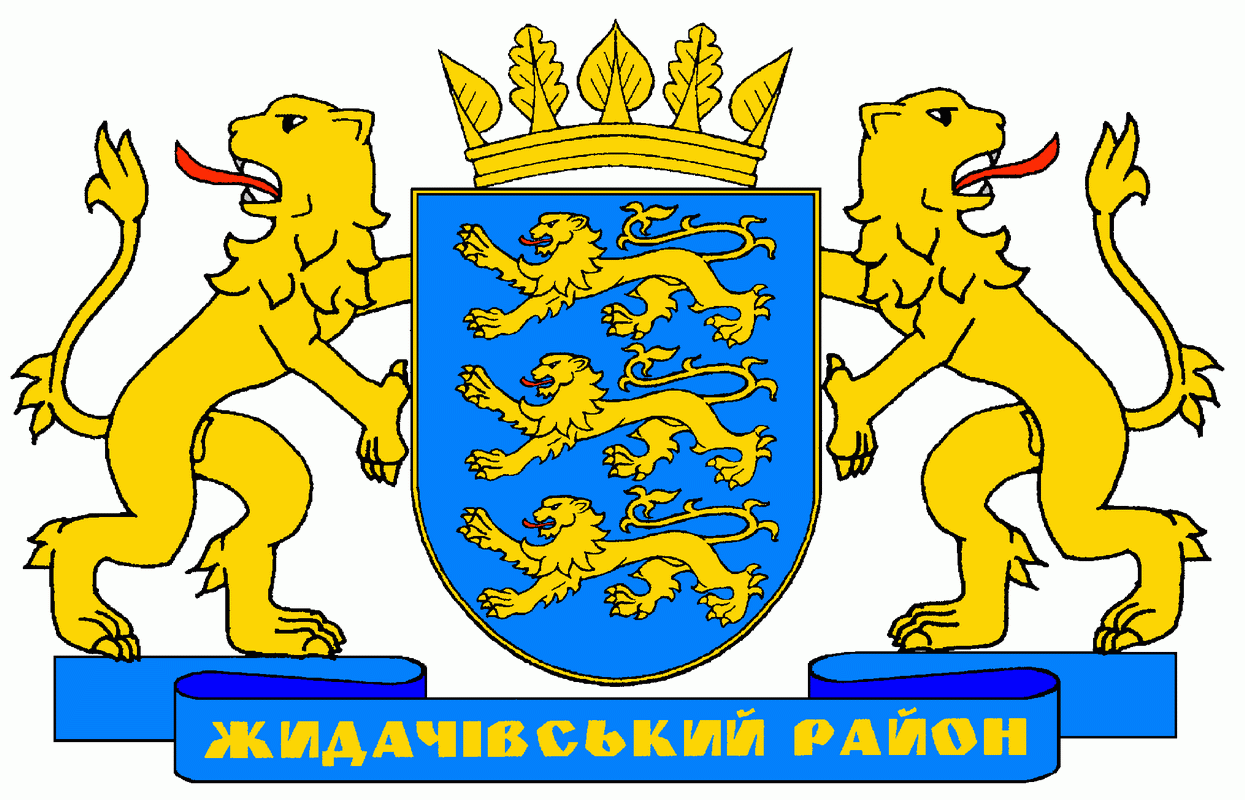
Zhydachiv Raion
2003

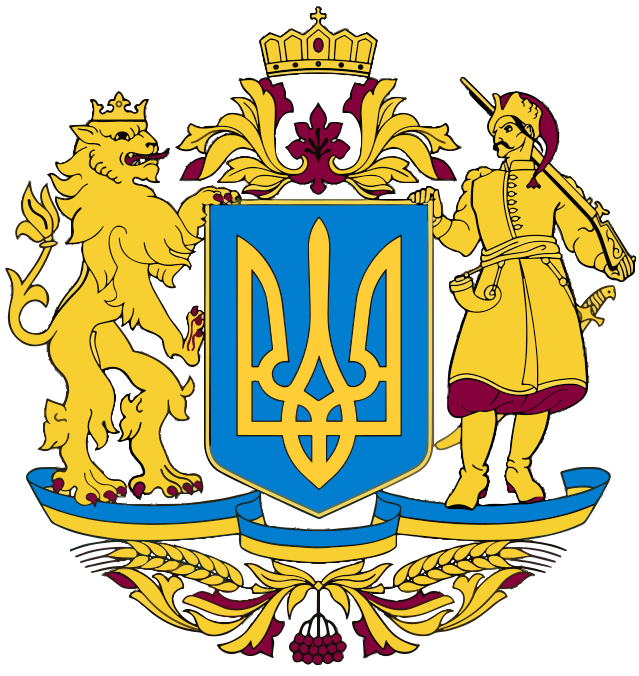
Ukraine
2007, project

== Gallery ==
Lwów Voivodeship
(1928)

Subcarpathian Voivodeship (2000)

24th Mechanized Brigade
Ukraine

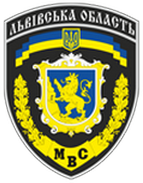
BPOP "Lviv"
Ukraine

== See also ==
- Coat of arms of Ukraine
- Heraldry of León
- Lion of Judah

== Sources ==
- Дашкевич Я. Геральдичне зображення Лева в період Галицько-Волинської держави (перша половина XІV ст.) // Знак. Вісник Українського геральдичного товариства. Ч. 16. Львів, 1998. С. 6–8.
- Гайке, В.Д. Українська Дивізія «Галичина». Історія формування і бойових дій у 1943–1945 роках / за заг. ред. В Кубійовича; пер. Р. Колісник. Тернопіль: Мандрівець, 2012.
- Головна Руська Рада. 1848–1851: протоколи засідань і книга кореспонденції / Ін-т Історії Церкви Укр. Католиц. Ун-ту, Центр. держ. іст. архів України; упоряд. У. Кришталович та І. Сварник; за ред. О. Турія. Львів, 2002.
- Гречило, А. Герб Львова: генеза, традиції, відродження // Історія Львова. Т. 1 (1256–1772). Львів, 2006, С. 38–44.
- Климкевич, Р. Золотий лев Романовичів. // Шлях, Ч. 25. Філядельфія, 1963.
- Климкевич, Р. Найвищі відзнаки Західно-Української Народної Республіки // Український історик. 1967. № 3–4, C. 109–123.
- Климкевич, Р. Руський лев в емблемах міста Ченстохови і князя Володислава Опольського. // Український історик. 1972. № 3–4, C. 92–96.
- Конституційні акти України. 1917–1920. Невідомі конституції України. Київ: Філософська і соціологічна думка, 1992.
- Лаппо-Данилевский, А. Печати последних галичско-владимирских князей и их советников / / Болеслав-Юрий II Тройденович, князь Малой Руси: Сборник материалов и исследований. Санкт-Петербург, 1907. С. 211–310.
- Наукові записки / Львівський історичний музей. Львів, 1995. Вип. 4–5.
- Однороженко, О. Родові, династичні та територіальні знаки в литовсько-руській князівській геральдиці XIV – першої половини XVІI століть // Записки Наукового товариства імені Шевченка. Том ССLXXI: Праці Комісії спеціальних (допоміжних) історичних дисциплін. Львів, 2018. С. 366–453.
- Сова, А. До історії прапора товариства «Сокіл–Батько» у Львові // Знак, № 29. 2003.
- Barwiński, В. Pieczęcie książąt halicko-włodzimierskich z pierwszej polowy XIV wieku // Wiadomosci numizmatyczno-archeologiczne. 1909. Nr 6. S. 99–104; Nr 7. S. 127–130.
