= Koza Wielka =

- Village
- Location within Poland
- Coordinates: 51°17′N 17°46′E
- Country: Poland
- Voivodeship: Greater Poland
- County: Kępno
- Gmina: Perzów

Koza Wielka [ˈkɔza ˈvjɛlka] is a village in the administrative district of Gmina Perzów, within Kępno County, Greater Poland Voivodeship, in west-central Poland.
