= Różyczka, Greater Poland Voivodeship =

Różyczka
- Village
- Location within Poland
- Coordinates: 51°11′02″N 17°56′52″E
- Country: Poland
- Voivodeship: Greater Poland
- County: Kępno
- Gmina: Trzcinica

Różyczka [ruˈʐɨt͡ʂka] is a village in the administrative district of Gmina Trzcinica, within Kępno County, Greater Poland Voivodeship, in west-central Poland.
