= Kuźnica Trzcińska =

- Village
- Location within Poland
- Coordinates: 51°9′N 18°2′E
- Country: Poland
- Voivodeship: Greater Poland
- County: Kępno
- Gmina: Trzcinica
- Population: 226

Kuźnica Trzcińska (Polish pronunciation: [kuʑˈɲit͡sa ˈtʂt͡ɕij̃ska]) is a village in the administrative district of Gmina Trzcinica, within Kępno County, Greater Poland Voivodeship, in west-central Poland.
