= Ignacówka Trzecia =

- Village
- Location within Poland
- Coordinates: 51°8′33″N 18°3′12″E
- Country: Poland
- Voivodeship: Greater Poland
- County: Kępno
- Gmina: Trzcinica

Ignacówka Trzecia [iɡnaˈt͡sufka ˈtʂɛt͡ɕa] is a village in the administrative district of Gmina Trzcinica, within Kępno County, Greater Poland Voivodeship, in west-central Poland.
