= Aniołka Pierwsza =

- Village
- Location within Poland
- Coordinates: 51°8′12″N 17°59′59″E
- Country: Poland
- Voivodeship: Greater Poland
- County: Kępno
- Gmina: Trzcinica

Aniołka Pierwsza [aˈɲɔu̯ka ˈpjɛrfʂa] is a village in the administrative district of Gmina Trzcinica, within Kępno County, Greater Poland Voivodeship, in west-central Poland.
