= Chojęcin =

- Village
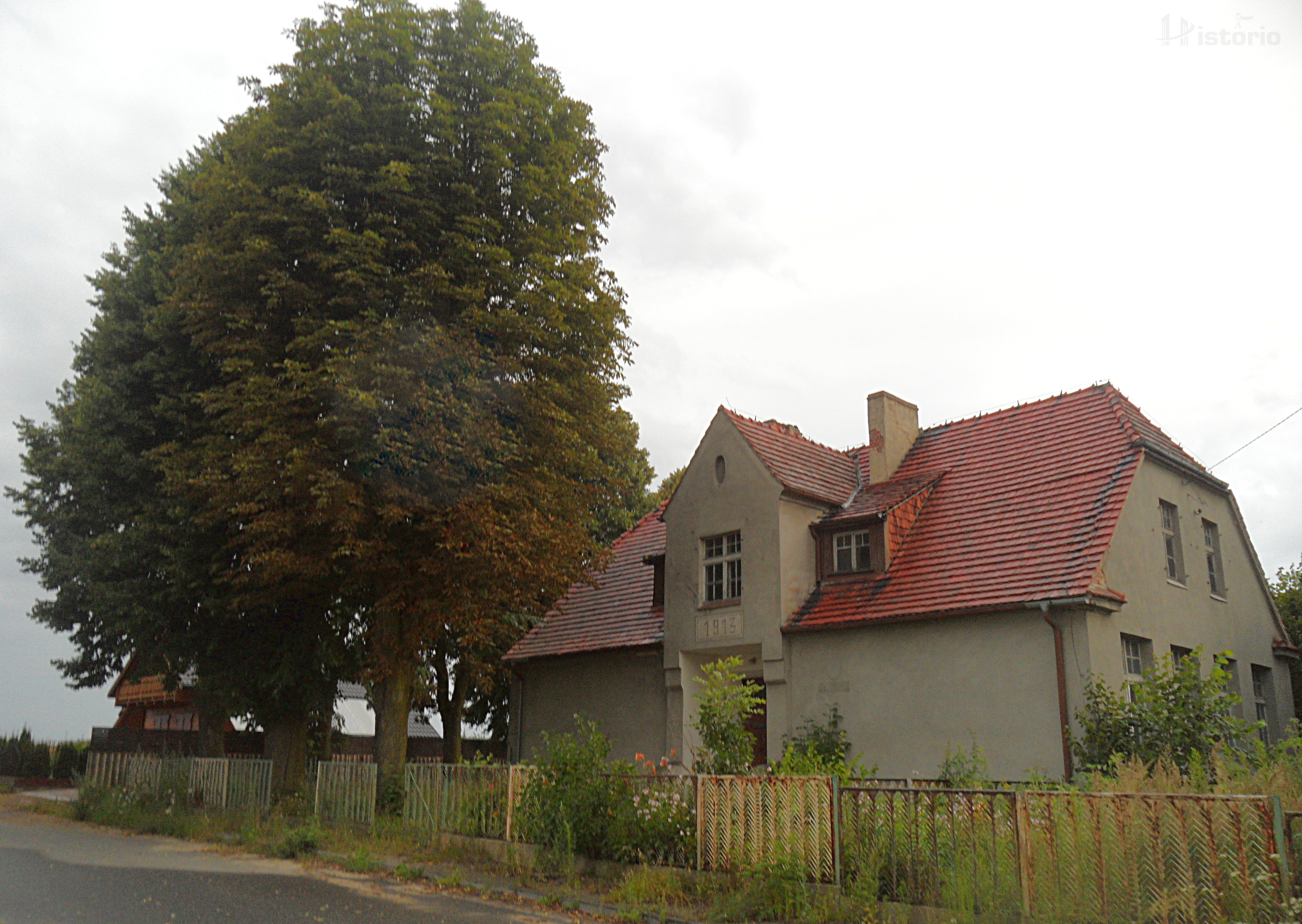

- Location within Poland
- Coordinates: 51°16′N 17°57′E
- Country: Poland
- Voivodeship: Greater Poland
- County: Kępno
- Gmina: Bralin

Population
  - Total: 510
- Time zone: UTC+1 (CET)
  - Summer (DST): UTC+2 (CEST)
- Vehicle registration: PKE

Chojęcin [xɔˈjɛnt͡ɕin] is a village in the administrative district of Gmina Bralin, within Kępno County, Greater Poland Voivodeship, in west-central Poland.

== History ==
Following the joint German-Soviet invasion of Poland, which started World War II in September 1939, it was occupied by Nazi Germany until 1945. In 1939, the Germans carried out the first expulsions of Poles, who were deported in freight trains to Mińsk Mazowiecki in the more-eastern part of German-occupied Poland.
