= Nowa Wieś Książęca =

- Village
- Location within Poland
- Coordinates: 51°14′10″N 17°51′44″E
- Country: Poland
- Voivodeship: Greater Poland
- County: Kępno
- Gmina: Bralin

Nowa Wieś Książęca [ˈnɔva ˈvjɛɕ kɕɔ̃ˈʐɛnt͡sa] is a village in the administrative district of Gmina Bralin, within Kępno County, Greater Poland Voivodeship, in west-central Poland.
