= Gola, Kępno County =

Gola
- Village
- Location within Poland
- Coordinates: 51°17′N 17°51′E
- Country: Poland
- Voivodeship: Greater Poland
- County: Kępno
- Gmina: Bralin

Gola [ˈɡɔla] is a village in the administrative district of Gmina Bralin, within Kępno County, Greater Poland Voivodeship, in west-central Poland.
