= Dzierżążnik =

Dzierżążnik may refer to the following places:

- Dzierżążnik, Greater Poland Voivodeship (west-central Poland)
- Dzierżążnik, Pomeranian Voivodeship (north Poland)
- Dzierżążnik, Warmian-Masurian Voivodeship (north Poland)
