= Szalonka =

- Village
- Location within Poland
- Coordinates: 51°13′N 18°7′E
- Country: Poland
- Voivodeship: Greater Poland
- County: Kępno
- Gmina: Łęka Opatowska

Szalonka [ʂaˈlɔnka] is a village in the administrative district of Gmina Łęka Opatowska, within Kępno County, Greater Poland Voivodeship, in west-central Poland.
