= Zbyczyna =

- Village
- Location within Poland
- Coordinates: 51°13′N 17°49′E
- Country: Poland
- Voivodeship: Greater Poland
- County: Kępno
- Gmina: Perzów

Zbyczyna [zbɨˈt͡ʂɨna] is a village in the administrative district of Gmina Perzów, within Kępno County, Greater Poland Voivodeship, in west-central Poland.
