= Tabor Wielki =

- Village
- Location within Poland
- Coordinates: 51°17′N 17°52′E
- Country: Poland
- Voivodeship: Greater Poland
- County: Kępno
- Gmina: Bralin

Tabor Wielki (Polish pronunciation: [ˈtabɔr ˈvjɛlkʲi]) is a village in the administrative district of Gmina Bralin, within Kępno County, Greater Poland Voivodeship, in west-central Poland.

The village was founded in 1749 as Friedrichs-Tabor (Frederick′s Tábor) by Czech Protestant exiles.
