= Klasak =

- Village
- Location within Poland
- Coordinates: 51°11′22″N 18°08′51″E
- Country: Poland
- Voivodeship: Greater Poland
- County: Kępno
- Gmina: Łęka Opatowska

Klasak [ˈklasak] is a village in the administrative district of Gmina Łęka Opatowska, within Kępno County, Greater Poland Voivodeship, in west-central Poland.
