= Nowa Wieś, Gmina Trzcinica =

Nowa Wieś
- Settlement
- Location within Poland
- Coordinates: 51°12′45″N 18°1′59″E
- Country: Poland
- Voivodeship: Greater Poland
- County: Kępno
- Gmina: Trzcinica
- Population: 100

Nowa Wieś [ˈnɔva ˈvjɛɕ] is a settlement in the administrative district of Gmina Trzcinica, within Kępno County, Greater Poland Voivodeship, in west-central Poland.
