= Jadwiga Szeptycka =

Polish archeologist, ethnographer, and writer (1883–1939)

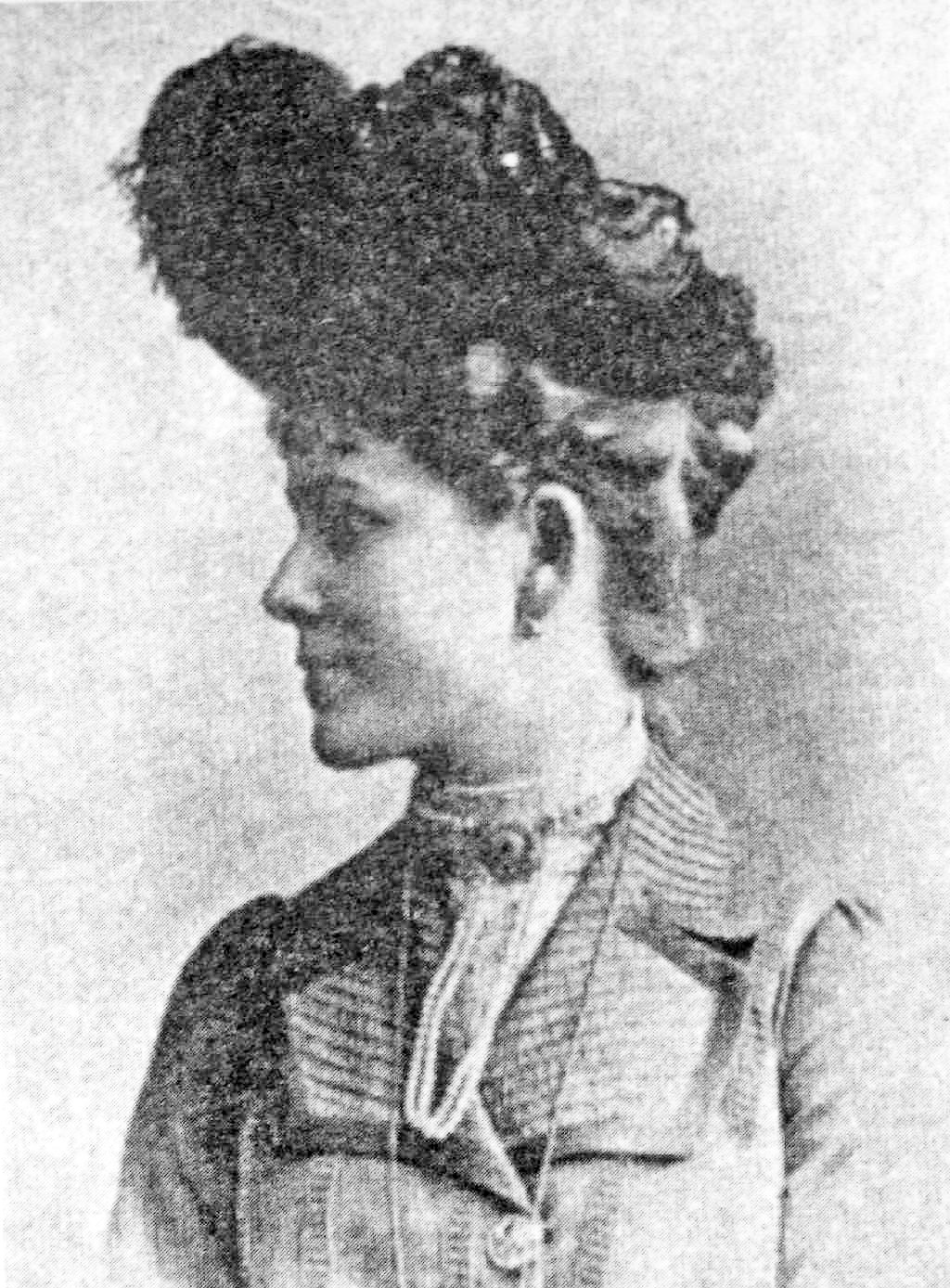
- Born: Jadzia Szembekówna; 16 March 1883; Siemianice, Poland
- Died: 27 September 1939 (aged 56); Prylbychi, Poland
- Other name: Inka Szeptycka
- Occupations: Archaeologist; ethnographer
- Spouse: Leon Szeptycki
- Children: 8
- Parents: Piotr Szembek (father); Maria Fredrów (mother)

Jadwiga Szeptycka (16 March 1883 – 27 September 1939) was a Polish published archeologist and ethnographer, writer and social activist. She was murdered by Soviet NKVD agents at her home in Poland after it was invaded by Soviet forces at the beginning of the Second World War.

== Life and work ==
Jadwiga Beatryksa Maria Szeptycka, known as Inka to her friends, was born in 1883 as Jadzia Szembekówna, on the family estate of Siemianice in the Kępiński poviat. She was the daughter of the landowner Count Piotr Szembek and Maria née Fredrów (daughter of Jan Aleksander and granddaughter of Aleksander Fredro). Inka received a thorough home education. As a teenager, while collaborating with her sister, Zofia, she organized the Association of Polish Children and a secret school, for which Inka taught Polish history and language. The school operated for several years (1898–1904) in Siemianice and nearby towns.

=== Archeologist ===
Working with her sister Zofia in 1897, Inka began archaeological research in a cemetery from the Roman period in her native village. Scientific supervision over these works was performed by the curator of the Poznań Society of Friends of Sciences, Bolesław Erzepki. The results of the research were published in the Report on archaeological searches carried out in recent years in Siemianice (Kępiński poviat) ("Roczniki PTPN" 1902).

=== Ethnographer ===
In addition to archeology, Inka was interested in the folk culture of Greater Poland, then called Eastern Galicia, and later called Eastern Lesser Poland. She collected folk songs (sheet music and texts) and recorded rituals, customs and information about ornamentation and architecture. She kept in touch with Seweryn Udziela and, with his help, published Contributions to the Ethnography of Wielkopolska (MAAE 8, 1906). This paper, together with her sister's publication Further Contributions to the Ethnography of Greater Poland (MAAE 12, 1912), are together considered to be a significant collection of materials on the folk culture of this region.

In October 1902, she married Leon Szeptycki, landowner and grandson of Aleksander Fredro. Because her fiancé was technically her cousin, the marriage had to receive a papal dispensation before it could proceed.

The wedding took place in the church in Siemianice. Inka made sure that the costumes of the groomsmen and bridesmaids (the first in the horse retinue) were sewn in accordance with the local folk tradition, and local songs sounded at the wedding.

She then moved to her husband's estate, Przyłbice near Jaworów where she raised two sons and six daughters. Meantime, she also continued her ethnographic research, which she discussed in an article entitled Contribution to the ethnography of the Jaworowski poviat presented at the meeting of the Ethnographic Commission of PAU in 1934.

=== Other interests ===
An active writer, Inka wrote and published poems, novels, histories and translations.

Inka remained active in the Catholic Church throughout her life and in 1926 she published a booklet explaining the Byzantine Rite Divine Liturgy to followers of the Roman Rite.

She continued her dedication to the people living in the nearby rural lands.

At the palace garden in Przyłbice, she established a nursery of fruit trees, which were then distributed among the rural population. Together with her husband, she founded and maintained orphanages in Przyłbice and Bruchnal, and supported local folk schools, both Ukrainian and Polish.

=== Murder ===
With the outbreak of World War II, Inka and her husband established an emergency hospital in their manor house for local refugees and wounded soldiers.

In 1939, with Polish borders breached by German and Soviet troops, she and her husband carefully moved their eight children to safety, but they remained on the estate. On 27 September, officers of the Soviet Union's NKVD arrived at their home and led Leon away to be shot, but Inka requested to join him. Both were murdered, but all of their children survived.

== Selected works ==
- Szeptycka, J. (1902) Report on archaeological searches carried out in recent years in Siemianice (Kępiński poviat) ("Roczniki PTPN").
- Szeptycka, J. (1906) Contributions to the Ethnography of Wielkopolska (MAAE 8,)
- Szeptycka, J. (1928). Report on explorations in Tarnowica, in the district of Yavorov (Lviv province) in the municipality of Bruchnal (owned by Count Leon Szeptycki). Przegląd Archeologiczny, 3(3), 213-215.
- Szeptycka, J. (1934). Contribution to the ethnography of the Jaworowski poviat (presented at the meeting of the Ethnographic Commission of PAU)
