= Granice, Gmina Trzcinica =

Granice
- Village
- Location within Poland
- Coordinates: 51°12′N 18°7′E
- Country: Poland
- Voivodeship: Greater Poland
- County: Kępno
- Gmina: Trzcinica

Granice [ɡraˈnit͡sɛ] is a village in the administrative district of Gmina Trzcinica, within Kępno County, Greater Poland Voivodeship, in west-central Poland.
