= Opatowiec, Greater Poland Voivodeship =

Opatowiec
- Village
- Location within Poland
- Coordinates: 51°14′N 18°6′E
- Country: Poland
- Voivodeship: Greater Poland
- County: Kępno
- Gmina: Łęka Opatowska

Opatowiec [ɔpaˈtɔvjɛt͡s] is a village in the administrative district of Gmina Łęka Opatowska, within Kępno County, Greater Poland Voivodeship, in west-central Poland.
