= Gosławski =

Goslawski or Gosławski (feminine: Gosławska; plural: Gosławscy) is a Polish-language surname. The surname means "someone from Gosław". It is a Polish noble surname associated with several coats-of-arms. The Russified form is Goslavsky (feminine: Goslavskaya). Notable people with this name include:

- Anna Gosławska-Lipińska (1915–1975), Polish artist
- Evgeny Goslavsky (1861–1917), Russian writer, playwright and poet
- Józef Gosławski (architect) (1865–1904), Polish architect
- Józef Gosławski (sculptor) (1908–1963), Polish sculptor and medallic artist
- Sofya Goslavskaya (1890–1979), Russian actress
- Wanda Gosławska (1922–2020), Polish artist
