= Domasłów =

- Village
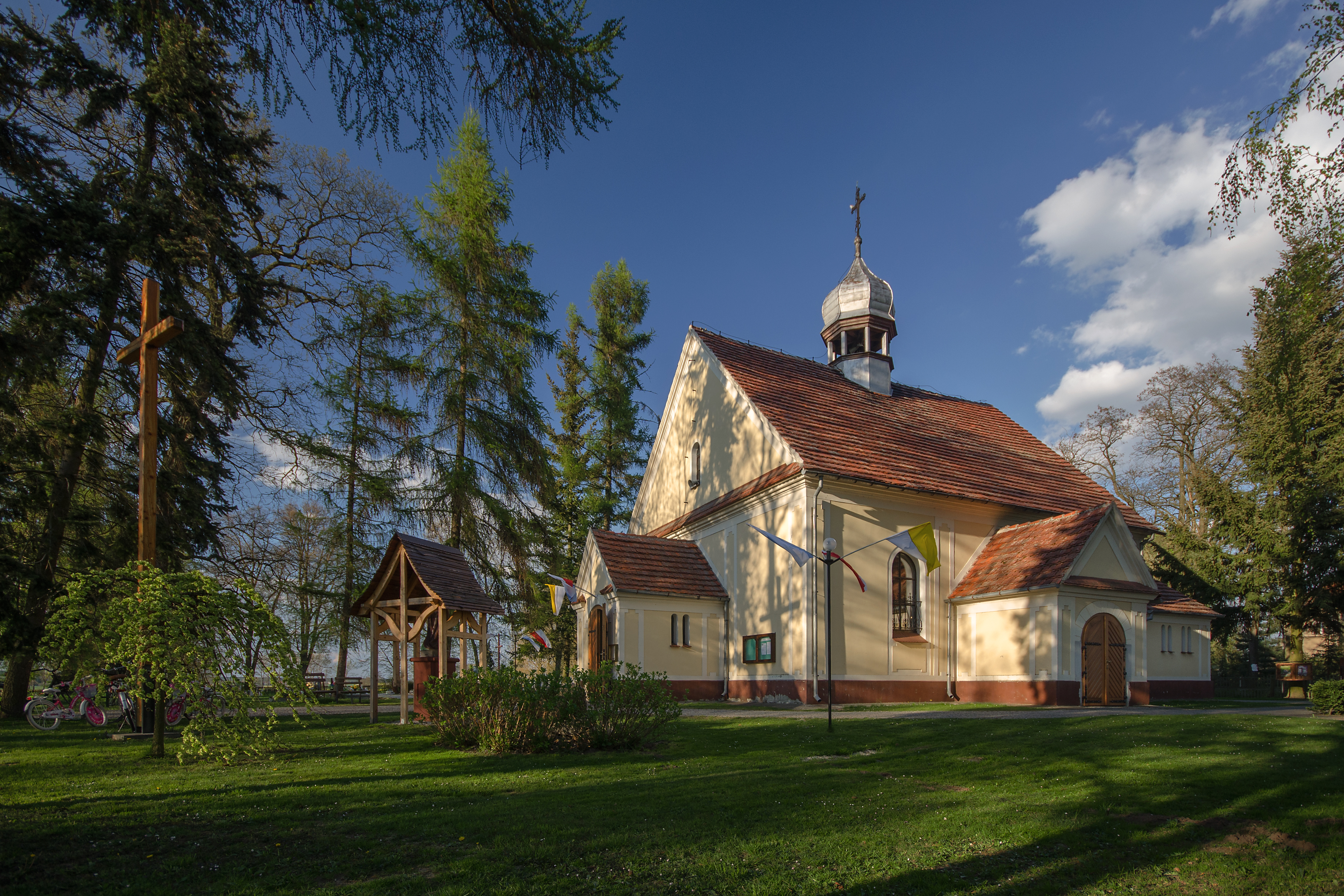
- Saint Giles church in Domasłów

- Location within Poland
- Coordinates: 51°15′N 17°47′E
- Country: Poland
- Voivodeship: Greater Poland
- County: Kępno
- Gmina: Perzów
- Time zone: UTC+1 (CET)
  - Summer (DST): UTC+2 (CEST)
- Vehicle registration: PKE

Domasłów [dɔˈmaswuf] is a village in the administrative district of Gmina Perzów, within Kępno County, Greater Poland Voivodeship, in south-central Poland.

During World War II, the German occupying administration operated a forced labour subcamp of the Stalag XXI-A prisoner-of-war camp in the village.
