= Aniołka-Parcele =

- Settlement
- Location within Poland
- Coordinates: 51°8′54″N 17°58′41″E
- Country: Poland
- Voivodeship: Greater Poland
- County: Kępno
- Gmina: Trzcinica

Aniołka-Parcele [aˈɲɔu̯ka parˈt͡sɛlɛ] is a settlement in the administrative district of Gmina Trzcinica, within Kępno County, Greater Poland Voivodeship in west-central Poland.
