= Rockoff =

Rockoff is a German surname. Notable people with the surname include:

- Al Rockoff (born 1946), American photojournalist
- Dylan Rockoff (born 1994), American singer-songwriter
- Jonah Rockoff, American education economist

== See also ==
- Rakoff
