= Teklin, Greater Poland Voivodeship =

Teklin
- Village
- Location within Poland
- Coordinates: 51°07′57″N 18°01′23″E
- Country: Poland
- Voivodeship: Greater Poland
- County: Kępno
- Gmina: Trzcinica

Teklin [ˈtɛklin] is a village in the administrative district of Gmina Trzcinica, within Kępno County, Greater Poland Voivodeship, in west-central Poland.
