= Chudoba =

Chudoba may refer to:

- Anna Chudoba, Polish-born model
- Chudoba, Greater Poland Voivodeship, a village in west-central Poland
- Chudoba, Gmina Byczyna, a village in Opole Voivodeship (south-west Poland)
- Chudoba, Gmina Lasowice Wielkie (German Kudoba), another village in Opole Voivodeship
