= Słupia pod Bralinem =

- Village
- Location within Poland
- Coordinates: 51°17′36″N 17°47′32″E
- Country: Poland
- Voivodeship: Greater Poland
- County: Kępno
- Gmina: Perzów

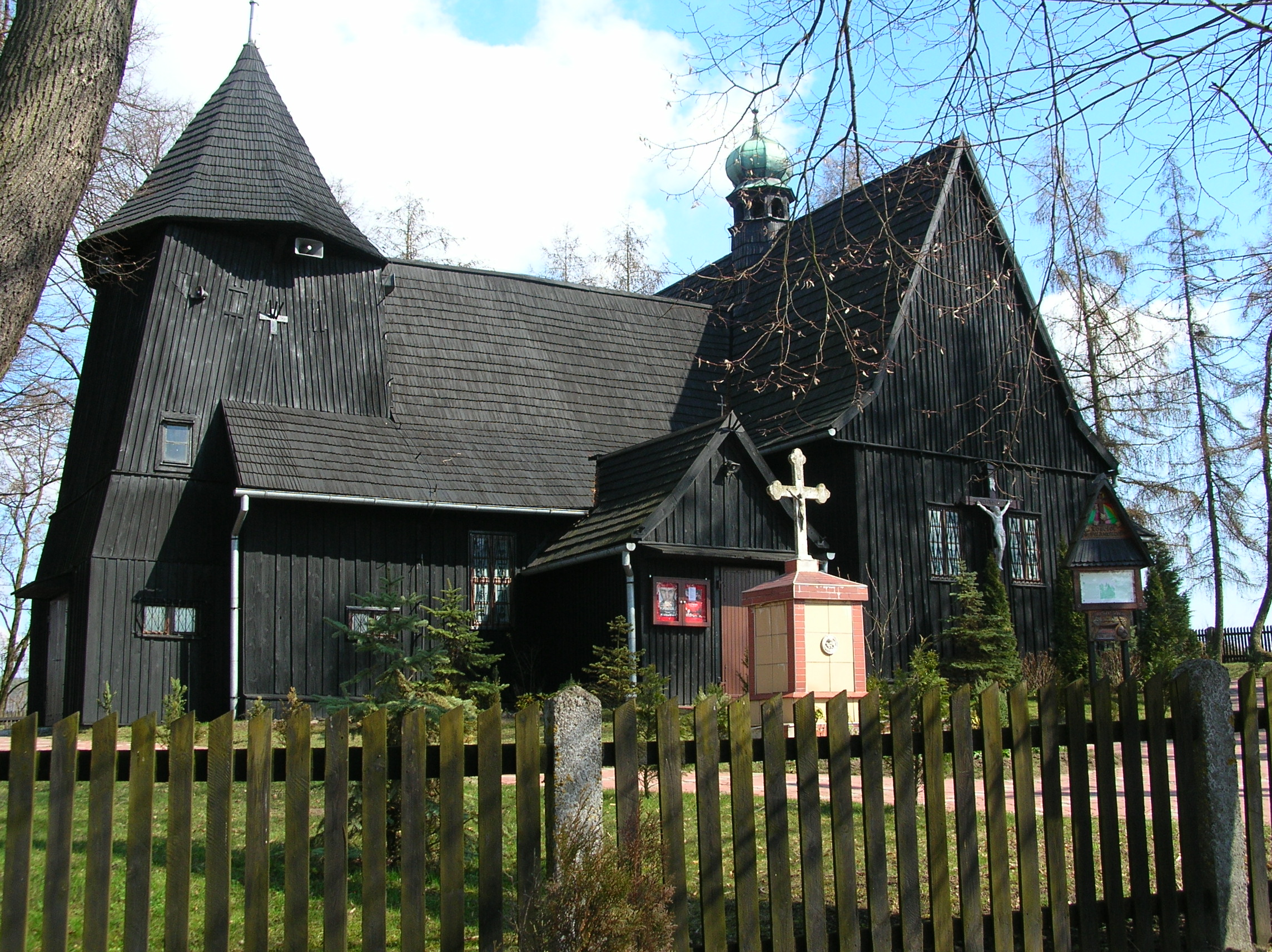
St. Andrew's wooden church in Słupia pod Bralinem

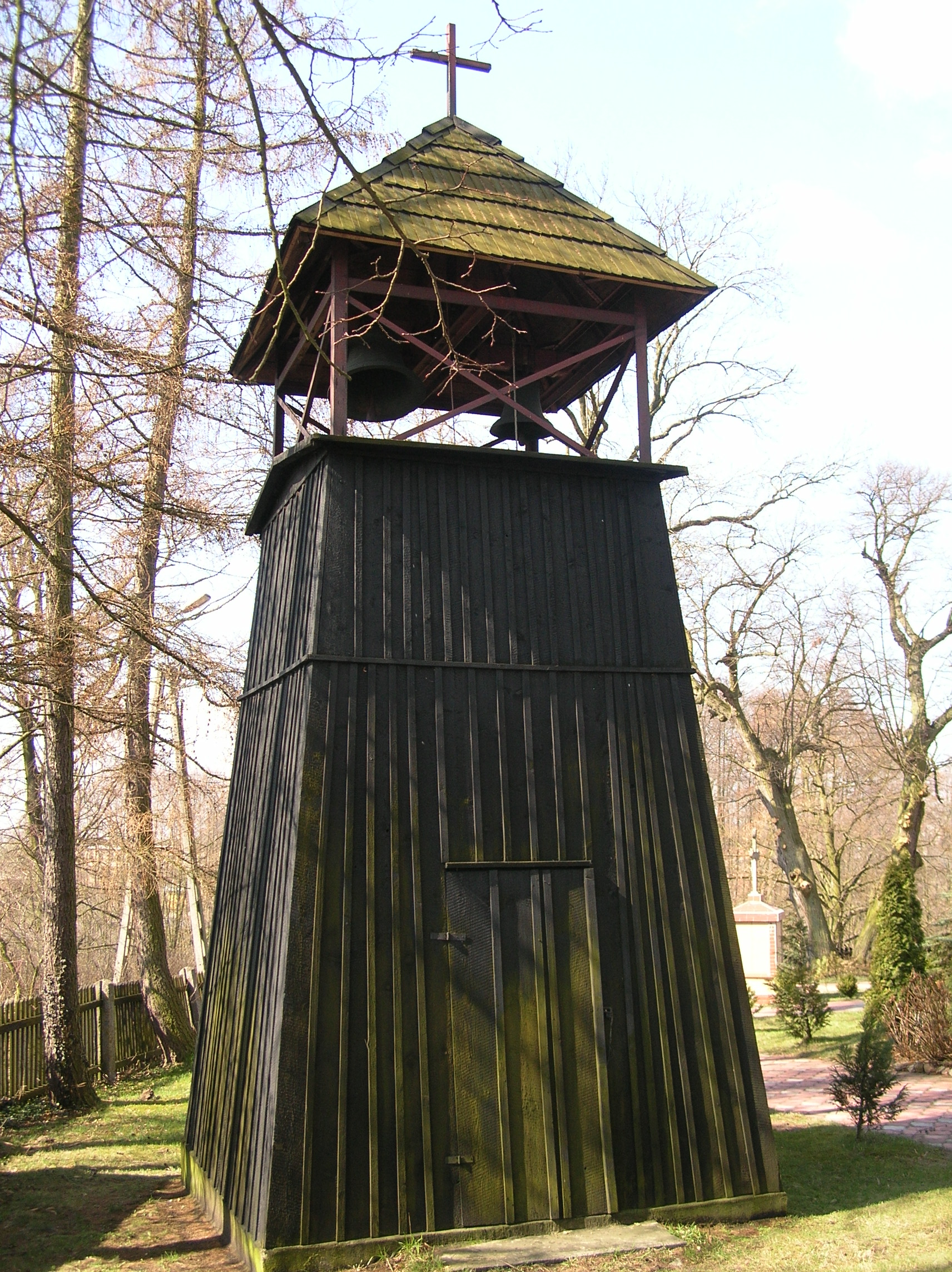
Wooden tower bell near St. Andrew's church in Słupia pod Bralinem

Słupia pod Bralinem [ˈswupja ˈpɔt braˈlinɛm] is a village in the administrative district of Gmina Perzów, within Kępno County, Greater Poland Voivodeship, in west-central Poland.
