= Tabor Mały =

- Village
- Location within Poland
- Coordinates: 51°18′N 17°53′E
- Country: Poland
- Voivodeship: Greater Poland
- County: Kępno
- Gmina: Bralin

Tabor Mały [ˈtabɔr ˈmawɨ] is a village in the administrative district of Gmina Bralin, within Kępno County, Greater Poland Voivodeship, in west-central Poland.
