= Siemionka =

- Settlement
- Location within Poland
- Coordinates: 51°10′9″N 17°59′7″E
- Country: Poland
- Voivodeship: Greater Poland
- County: Kępno
- Gmina: Trzcinica

Siemionka [ɕɛˈmjɔnka] is a settlement in the administrative district of Gmina Trzcinica, within Kępno County, Greater Poland Voivodeship, in west-central Poland.
