= Rakov =

Rakov may refer to:

- Rakov (surname)
- Rakaŭ, a village in Belarus known in Russian as Rakov
- Rakov (Přerov District), a village in the Czech Republic

== See also ==
- Rakoff
- Rakow (disambiguation)
