= Borek, Kępno County =

Borek
- Village
- Location within Poland
- Coordinates: 51°11′N 18°3′E
- Country: Poland
- Voivodeship: Greater Poland
- County: Kępno
- Gmina: Trzcinica

Borek [ˈbɔrɛk] is a village in the administrative district of Gmina Trzcinica, within Kępno County, Greater Poland Voivodeship, in west-central Poland.
