= Nosale =

- Village
- Location within Poland
- Coordinates: 51°15′N 17°55′E
- Country: Poland
- Voivodeship: Greater Poland
- County: Kępno
- Gmina: Bralin
- Population: 200

Nosale [nɔˈsalɛ] is a village in the administrative district of Gmina Bralin, within Kępno County, Greater Poland Voivodeship, in west-central Poland.
