= Wodziczna, Greater Poland Voivodeship =

Wodziczna
- Village
- Location within Poland
- Coordinates: 51°8′53″N 18°1′23″E
- Country: Poland
- Voivodeship: Greater Poland
- County: Kępno
- Gmina: Trzcinica
- Time zone: UTC+1 (CET)
  - Summer (DST): UTC+2 (CEST)
- Vehicle registration: PKE

Wodziczna [vɔˈd͡ʑit͡ʂna] is a village in the administrative district of Gmina Trzcinica, within Kępno County, Greater Poland Voivodeship, in west-central Poland.

Wodziczna was a private town, administratively located in the Wieluń County in the Sieradz Voivodeship in the Greater Poland Province of the Kingdom of Poland.
