= Stogniew, Greater Poland Voivodeship =

Stogniew
- Village
- Location within Poland
- Coordinates: 51°12′23″N 18°03′55″E
- Country: Poland
- Voivodeship: Greater Poland
- County: Kępno
- Gmina: Łęka Opatowska

Stogniew [ˈstɔɡɲɛf] is a village in the administrative district of Gmina Łęka Opatowska, within Kępno County, Greater Poland Voivodeship, in west-central Poland.
