= Kwasielina =

- Village
- Location within Poland
- Coordinates: 51°09′03″N 18°02′43″E
- Country: Poland
- Voivodeship: Greater Poland
- County: Kępno
- Gmina: Trzcinica

Kwasielina [kfaɕɛˈlina] is a village in the administrative district of Gmina Trzcinica, within Kępno County, Greater Poland Voivodeship, in west-central Poland.
