= Ignacówka Pierwsza =

- Village
- Location within Poland
- Coordinates: 51°8′N 18°0′E
- Country: Poland
- Voivodeship: Greater Poland
- County: Kępno
- Gmina: Trzcinica

Ignacówka Pierwsza [iɡnaˈt͡sufka ˈpjɛrfʂa] is a village in the administrative district of Gmina Trzcinica, within Kępno County, Greater Poland Voivodeship, in west-central Poland.
