= Smardze =

- Village
- Location within Poland
- Coordinates: 51°11′N 17°59′E
- Country: Poland
- Voivodeship: Greater Poland
- County: Kępno
- Gmina: Trzcinica
- Population (approx.): 400

Smardze [ˈsmard͡zɛ] is a village in the administrative district of Gmina Trzcinica, within Kępno County, Greater Poland Voivodeship, in west-central Poland.

The village has an approximate population of 400
