= Piaski, Kępno County =

Piaski
- Village
- Location within Poland
- Coordinates: 51°14′N 18°6′E
- Country: Poland
- Voivodeship: Greater Poland
- County: Kępno
- Gmina: Łęka Opatowska
- Time zone: UTC+1 (CET)
  - Summer (DST): UTC+2 (CEST)
- Postal code: 63-645
- Vehicle registration: PKE

Piaski (Polish pronunciation: [ˈpjaskʲi]) is a village in the administrative district of Gmina Łęka Opatowska, within Kępno County, Greater Poland Voivodeship, in west-central Poland.
