= Rakov (surname) =

Rakov (feminine: Rakova) is a Slavic surname. Notable people with the surname include:

- Maxim Rakov (born 1986), Kazakhstani judoka
- Nikolai Rakov (1908-1990), Soviet composer
- Vadim Rakov (born 2005), Russian footballer
- Vasily Rakov (1909–1996), Soviet pilot
- Viktor Rakov (born 1962), Soviet and Russian film and theater actor
- Zapryan Rakov (born 1962), Bulgarian footballer

== See also ==
- Rakova
- Marina Rakova Case
- Rakoff
- Rakow (disambiguation)
