= Laski, Kępno County =

Laski
- Village
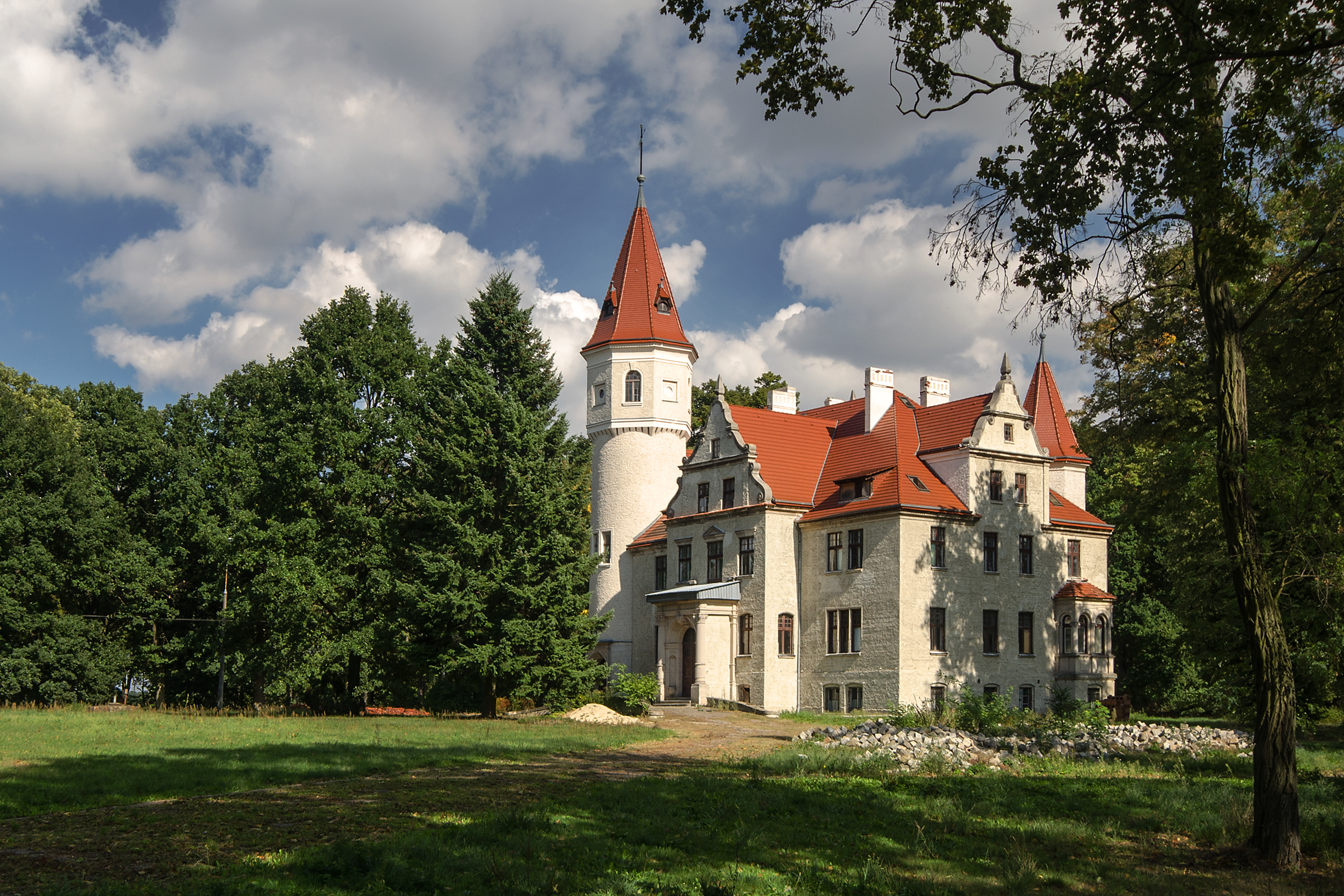
- Laski, Kępno County

- Location within Poland
- Coordinates: 51°11′38″N 18°01′31″E
- Country: Poland
- Voivodeship: Greater Poland
- County: Kępno
- Gmina: Trzcinica
- Population: 1,400

Laski (Polish pronunciation: [ˈlaskʲi]) is a village in the administrative district of Gmina Trzcinica, within Kępno County, Greater Poland Voivodeship, in west-central Poland.
