= Piotrówka =

Piotrówka may refer to:

- Polish name for the Petrůvka River, mainly in the Czech Republic
- Piotrówka, Subcarpathian Voivodeship (south-east Poland)
- Piotrówka, Greater Poland Voivodeship (west-central Poland)
- Piotrówka, Opole Voivodeship (south-west Poland)
- Piotrówka, Warmian-Masurian Voivodeship (north Poland)
