= Brzezie, Kępno County =

Brzezie
- Village
- Location within Poland
- Coordinates: 51°17′27″N 17°48′47″E
- Country: Poland
- Voivodeship: Greater Poland
- County: Kępno
- Gmina: Perzów

Brzezie [ˈbʐɛʑɛ] is a village in the administrative district of Gmina Perzów, within Kępno County, Greater Poland Voivodeship, in west-central Poland.
