= Dzierżążnik, Greater Poland Voivodeship =

Dzierżążnik
- Village
- Location within Poland
- Coordinates: 51°09′09″N 18°00′47″E
- Country: Poland
- Voivodeship: Greater Poland
- County: Kępno
- Gmina: Trzcinica

Dzierżążnik [d͡ʑɛrˈʐɔ̃ʐnik] is a village in the administrative district of Gmina Trzcinica, within Kępno County, Greater Poland Voivodeship, in west-central Poland.
