= Gmina Perzów =

Gmina Perzów Perzów Commune
- Gmina
- Flag Coat of arms

- Coordinates (Perzów): 51°17′N 17°49′E
- Country: Poland
- Voivodeship: Greater Poland
- County: Kępno
- Seat: Perzów

Area
  - Total: 75.46 km^{2} (29.14 sq mi)

Population (2006)
  - Total: 3,925
  - Density: 52.01/km^{2} (134.7/sq mi)
- Website: http://www.perzow.republika.pl

Gmina Perzów is a rural gmina (administrative district) in Kępno County, Greater Poland Voivodeship, in west-central Poland. Its seat is the village of Perzów, which lies approximately 12 kilometres (7 mi) west of Kępno and 139 km (86 mi) south-east of the regional capital Poznań.

The gmina covers an area of 75.46 square kilometres (29.1 sq mi), and as of 2006 its total population is 3,925.

== Villages ==
Gmina Perzów contains the villages and settlements of Brzezie, Domasłów, Koza Wielka, Miechów, Perzów, Słupia pod Bralinem, Trębaczów, Turkowy and Zbyczyna.

== Neighbouring gminas ==
Gmina Perzów is bordered by the gminas of Bralin, Dziadowa Kłoda, Kobyla Góra, Namysłów, Rychtal and Syców.
