= Gosław =

Gosław may refer to the following places:

- Gosław, Opole Voivodeship (south-west Poland)
- Gosław, Gryfice County in West Pomeranian Voivodeship (north-west Poland)
- Gosław, Koszalin County in West Pomeranian Voivodeship (north-west Poland)
