= Proślice =

- Village
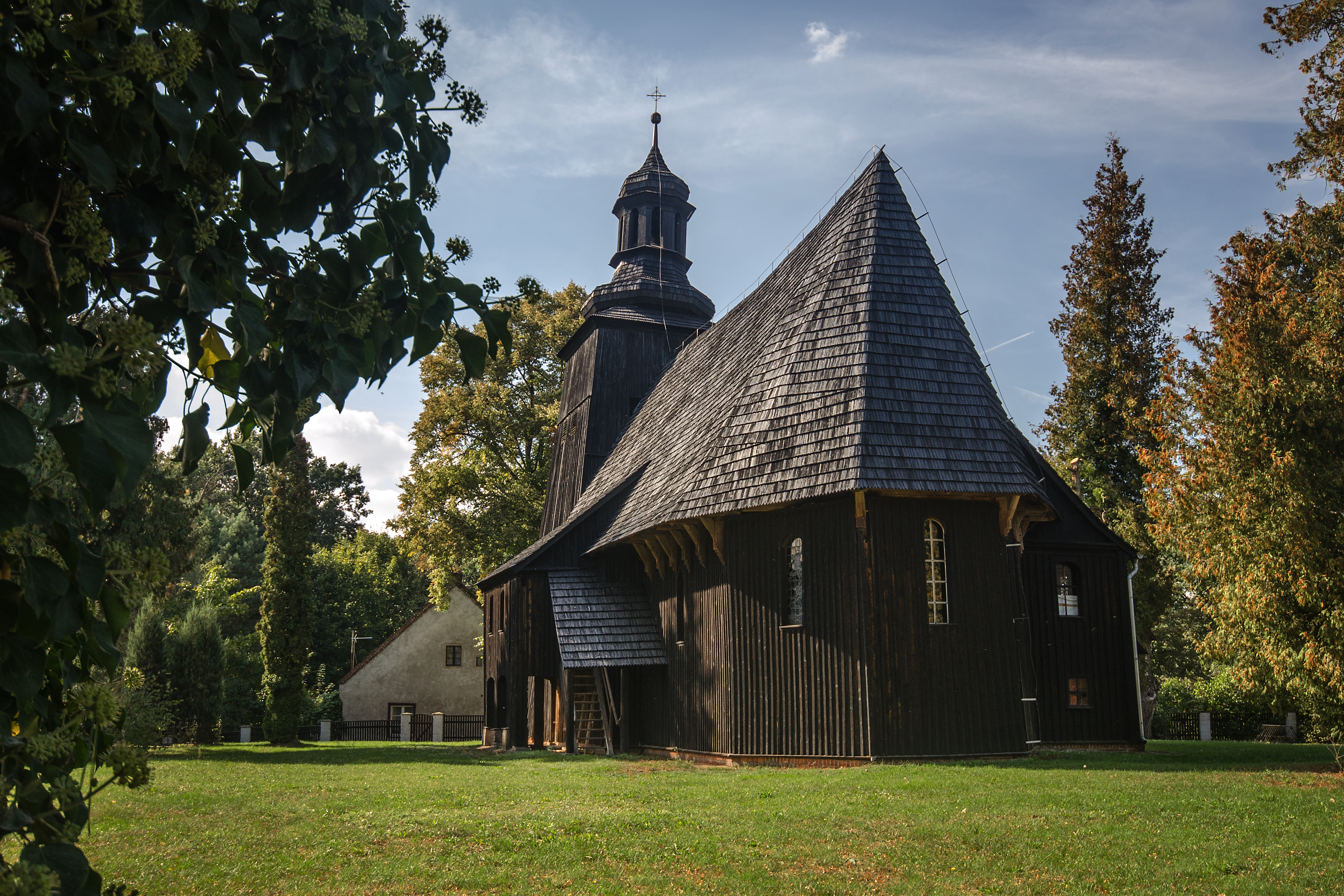
- Catholic church

- Location within Poland
- Coordinates: 51°6′N 18°7′E
- Country: Poland
- Voivodeship: Opole
- County: Kluczbork
- Gmina: Byczyna

Proślice [prɔˈɕlit͡sɛ] is a village in the administrative district of Gmina Byczyna, within Kluczbork County, Opole Voivodeship, in south-western Poland.
