= Nasale, Opole Voivodeship =

Nasale
- Village
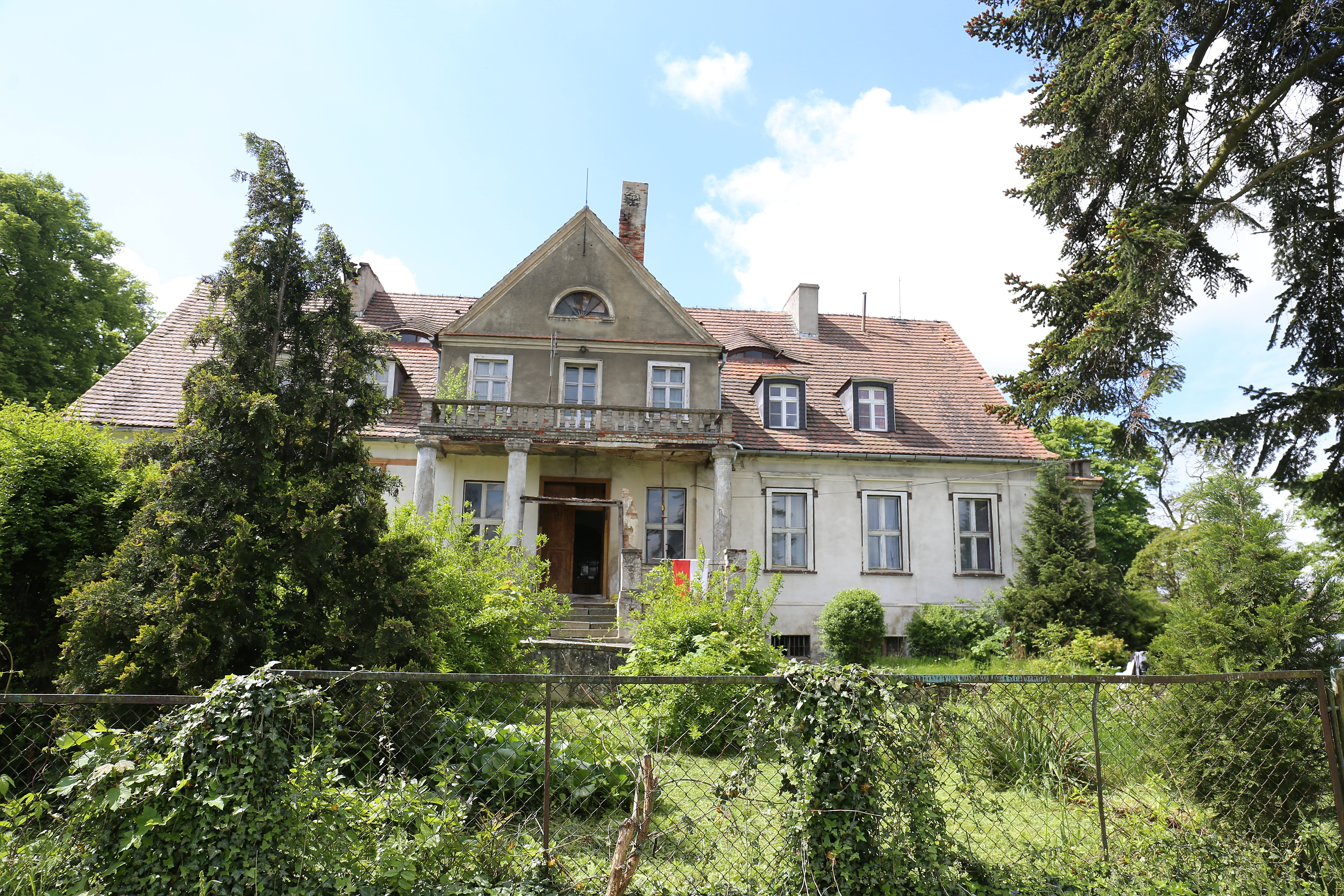

- Location within Poland
- Coordinates: 51°5′N 18°19′E
- Country: Poland
- Voivodeship: Opole
- County: Kluczbork
- Gmina: Byczyna

Nasale [naˈsalɛ] is a village in the administrative district of Gmina Byczyna, within Kluczbork County, Opole Voivodeship, in south-western Poland.
