= Kochłowice, Opole Voivodeship =

Kochłowice
- Village
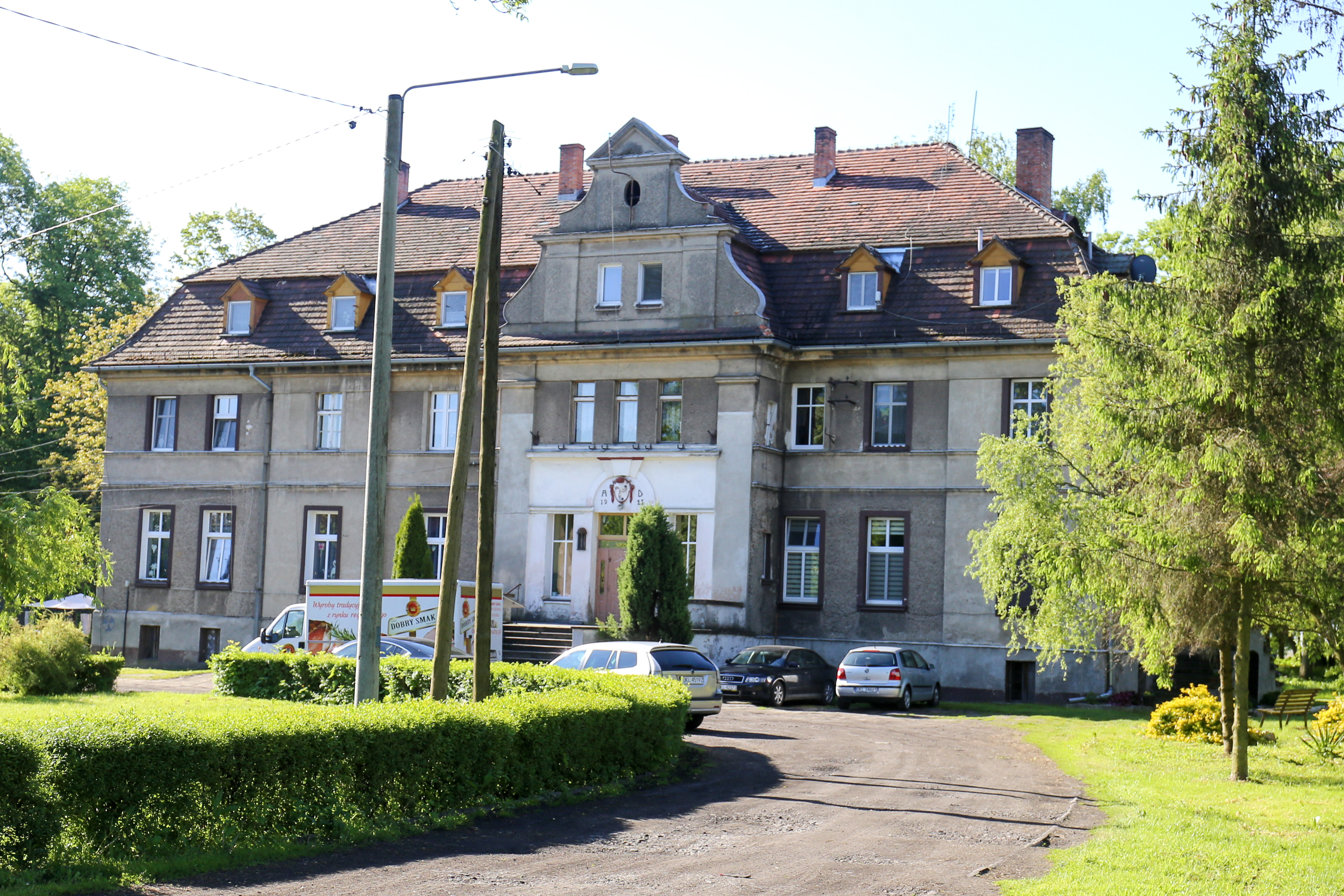
- Palace

- Location within Poland
- Coordinates: 51°5′N 18°11′E
- Country: Poland
- Voivodeship: Opole
- County: Kluczbork
- Gmina: Byczyna

Kochłowice [kɔxwɔˈvit͡sɛ] is a village in the administrative district of Gmina Byczyna, within Kluczbork County, Opole Voivodeship, in south-western Poland.

== Notable residents ==
- Andreas von Aulock (1893–1968), German military officer
