= Biskupice, Kluczbork County =

Biskupice
- Village
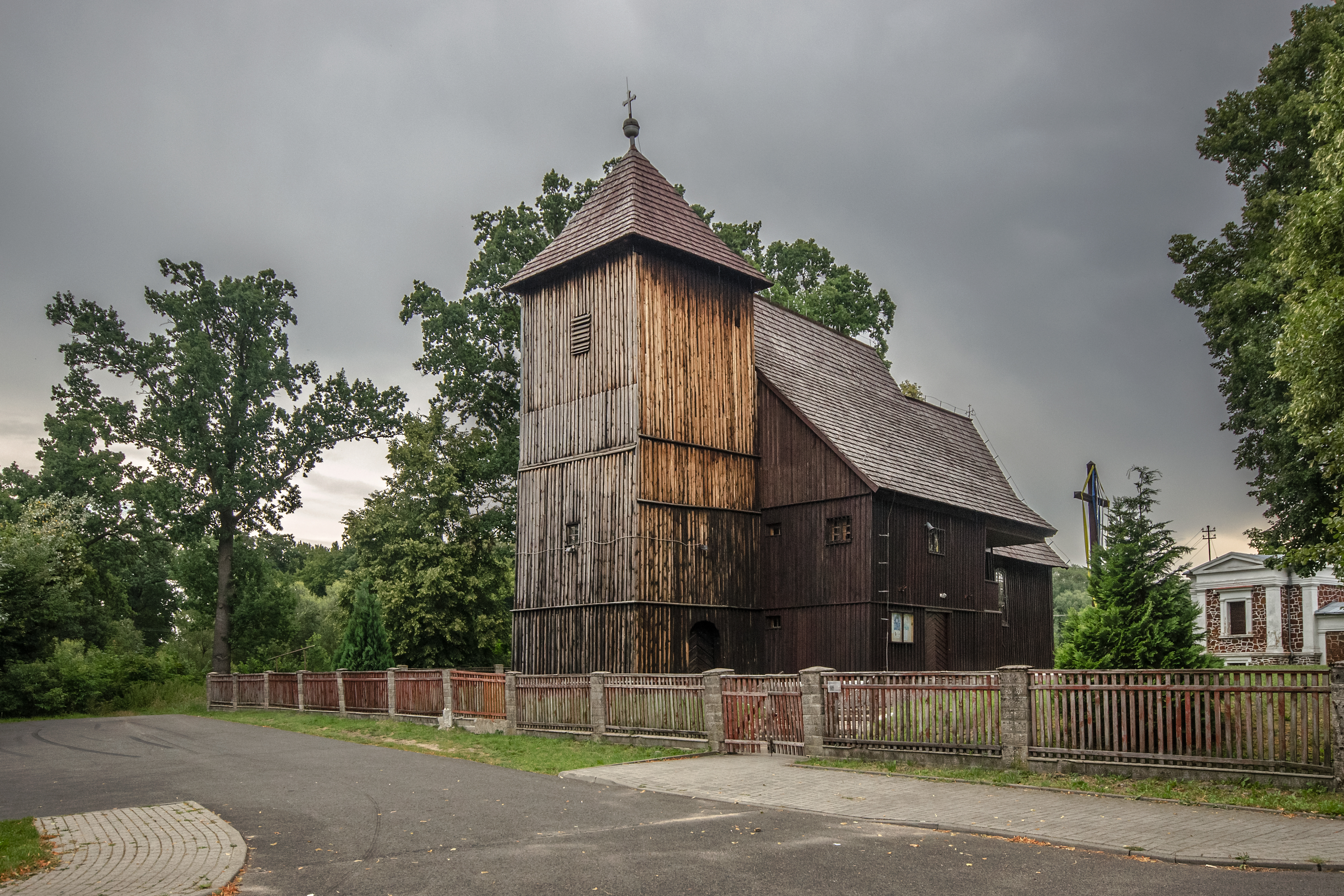
- Catholic church

- Location within Poland
- Coordinates: 51°5′N 18°12′E
- Country: Poland
- Voivodeship: Opole
- County: Kluczbork
- Gmina: Byczyna
- Elevation: 186 m (610 ft)
- Population: 660

Biskupice [biskuˈpit͡sɛ] is a village in the administrative district of Gmina Byczyna, within Kluczbork County, Opole Voivodeship, in south-western Poland.
