= Polanowice, Opole Voivodeship =

Polanowice
- Village
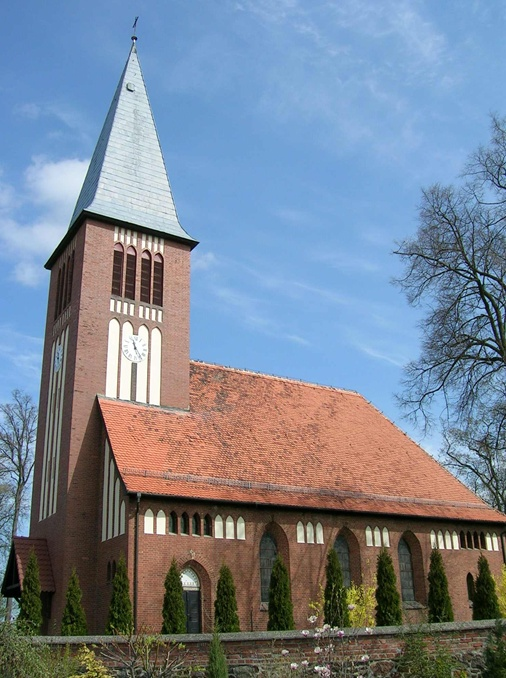
- Catholic church

- Location within Poland
- Coordinates: 51°6′N 18°11′E
- Country: Poland
- Voivodeship: Opole
- County: Kluczbork
- Gmina: Byczyna
- Population (approx.): 500

Polanowice [pɔlanɔˈvit͡sɛ] is a village in the administrative district of Gmina Byczyna, within Kluczbork County, Opole Voivodeship, in south-western Poland.
