= Dobiercice =

- Village
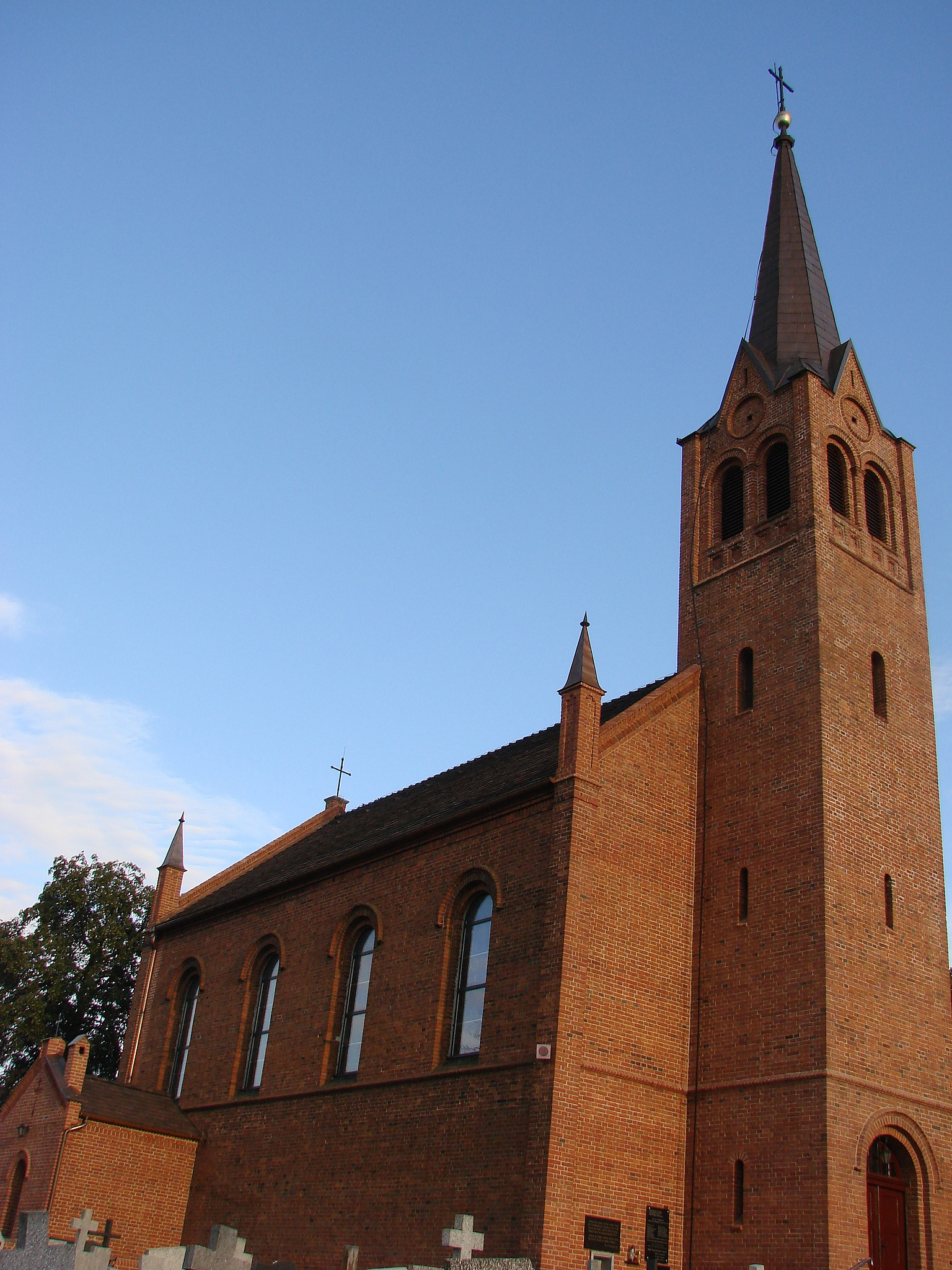
- Church of St. Jana z Dukla from 1861 in Dobiercice, Byczyna

- Flag Coat of arms

- Location within Poland
- Coordinates: 51°04′14″N 18°15′08″E
- Country: Poland
- Voivodeship: Opole
- County: Kluczbork
- Gmina: Byczyna

Dobiercice [dɔbjɛrˈt͡ɕit͡sɛ] is a village in the administrative district of Gmina Byczyna, within Kluczbork County, Opole Voivodeship, in south-western Poland.
