= Perzów =

- Village
- Location within Poland
- Coordinates: 51°17′N 17°49′E
- Country: Poland
- Voivodeship: Greater Poland
- County: Kępno
- Gmina: Perzów

Perzów [ˈpɛʐuf] is a village in Kępno County, Greater Poland Voivodeship, in west-central Poland. It is the seat of the gmina (administrative district) called Gmina Perzów.
