= Ciecierzyn, Opole Voivodeship =

Ciecierzyn
- Village
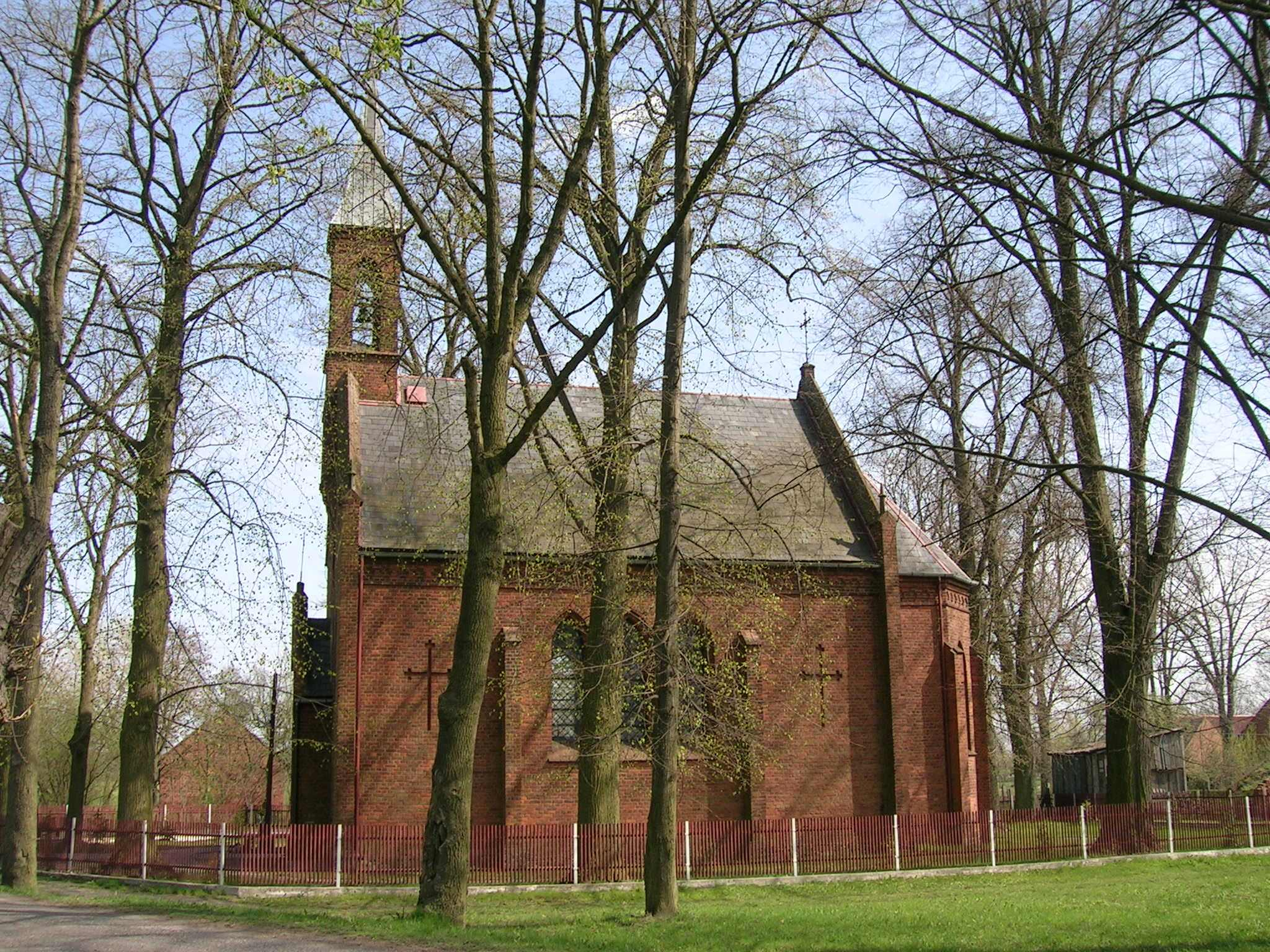
- Catholic church

- Location within Poland
- Coordinates: 51°08′17″N 18°09′40″E
- Country: Poland
- Voivodeship: Opole
- County: Kluczbork
- Gmina: Byczyna

Ciecierzyn [t͡ɕɛˈt͡ɕɛʐɨn] is a village in the administrative district of Gmina Byczyna, within Kluczbork County, Opole Voivodeship, in south-western Poland.
