= Sarnów, Opole Voivodeship =

Sarnów
- Village
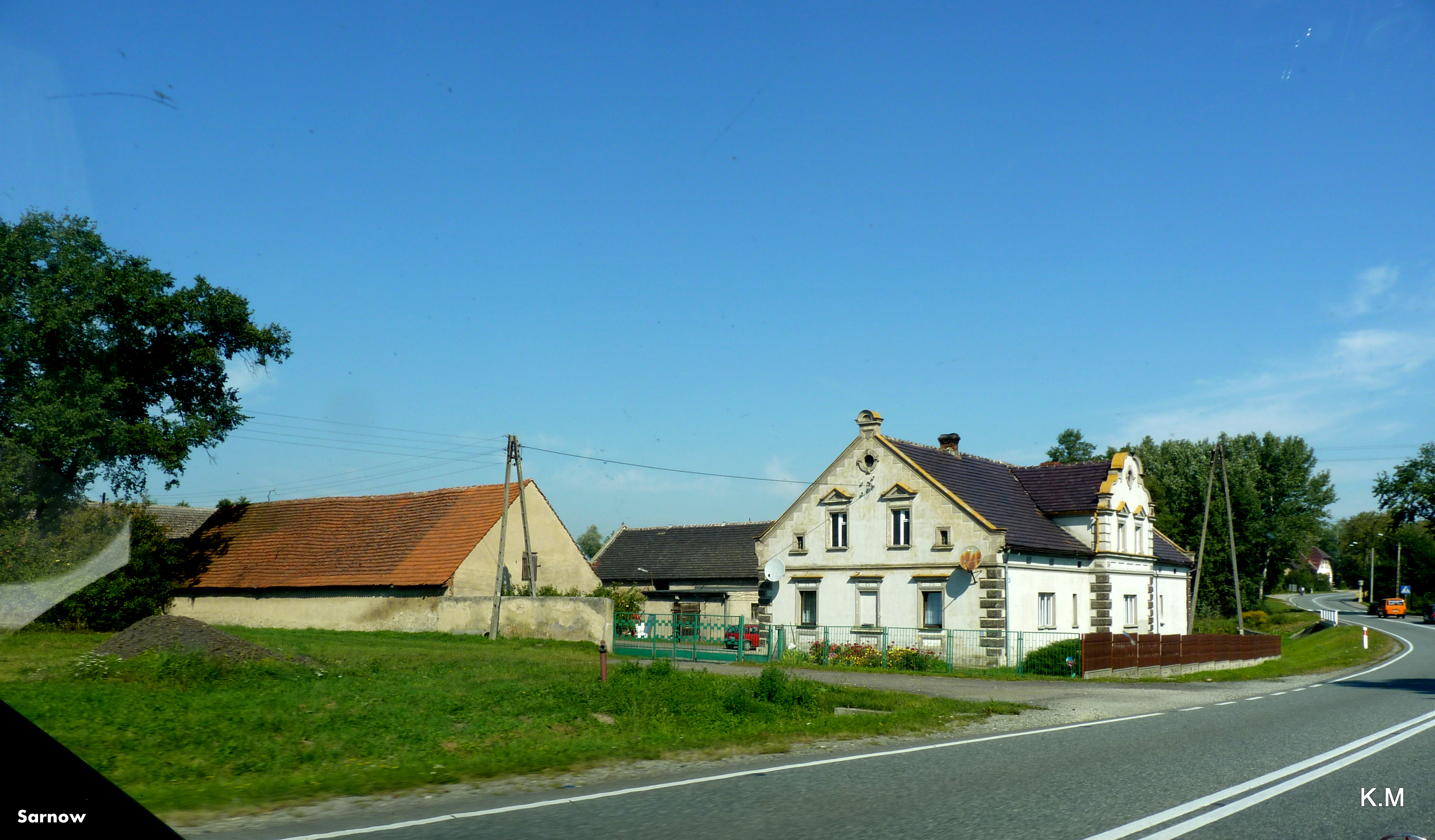

- Location within Poland
- Coordinates: 51°03′51″N 18°12′03″E
- Country: Poland
- Voivodeship: Opole
- County: Kluczbork
- Gmina: Byczyna
- Time zone: UTC+1 (CET)
  - Summer (DST): UTC+2 (CEST)

Sarnów [ˈsarnuf] is a village in the administrative district of Gmina Byczyna, within Kluczbork County, Opole Voivodeship, in southern Poland.
