= Gołkowice, Opole Voivodeship =

Gołkowice
- Village
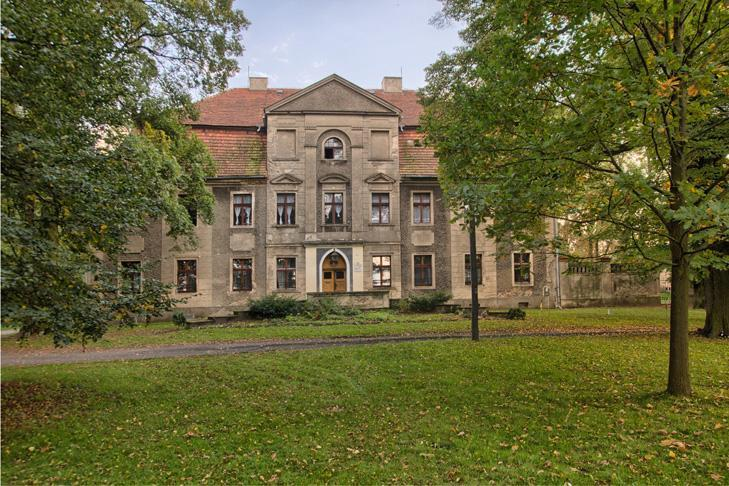
- Palace

- Location within Poland
- Coordinates: 51°8′N 18°11′E
- Country: Poland
- Voivodeship: Opole
- County: Kluczbork
- Gmina: Byczyna
- Population: 140

Gołkowice [ɡɔu̯kɔˈvit͡sɛ] is a village in the administrative district of Gmina Byczyna, within Kluczbork County, Opole Voivodeship, in south-western Poland.
