= Kostów =

- Village
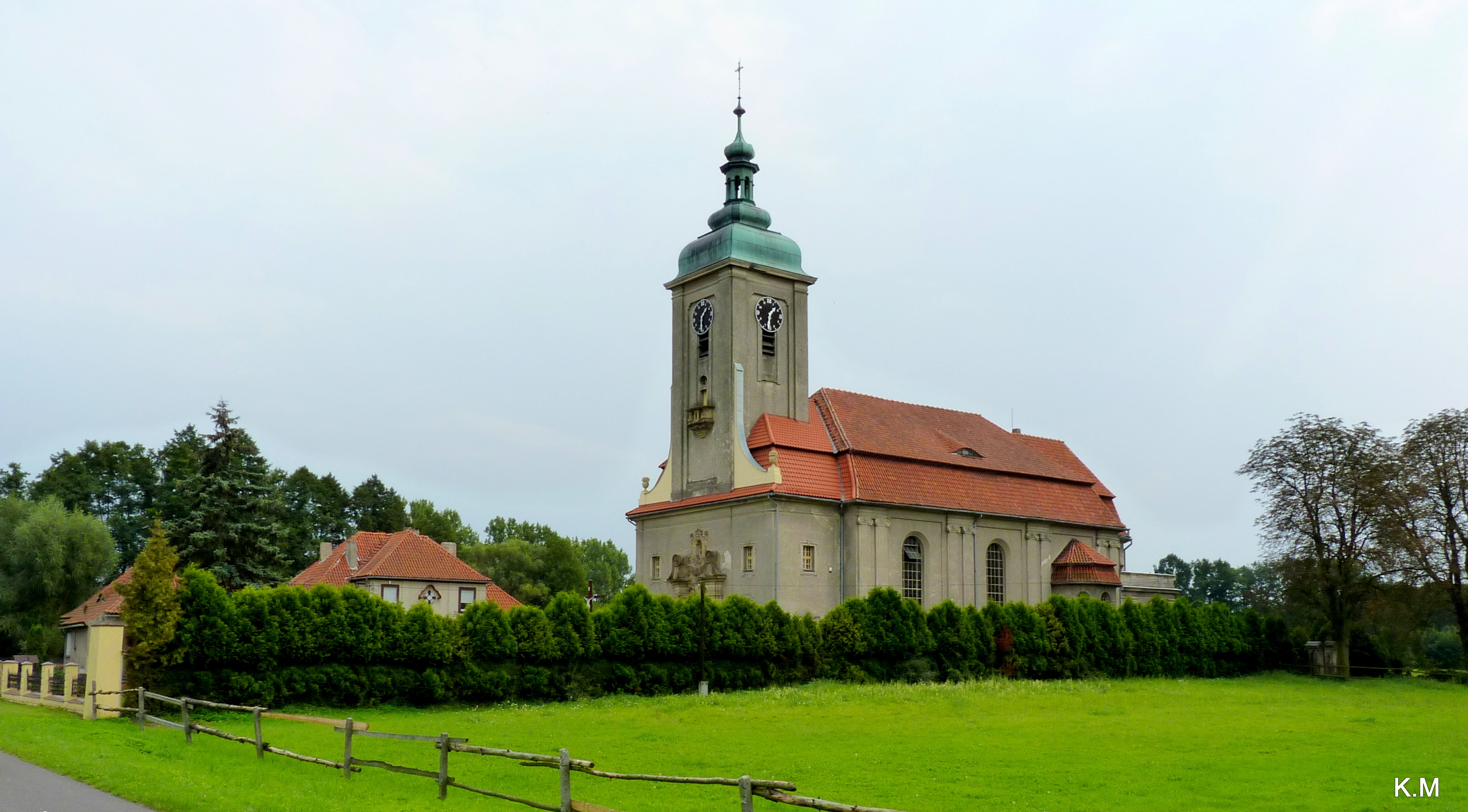
- Catholic church

- Location within Poland
- Coordinates: 51°10′N 18°9′E
- Country: Poland
- Voivodeship: Opole
- County: Kluczbork
- Gmina: Byczyna
- Population: 415

Kostów [ˈkɔstuf] is a village in the administrative district of Gmina Byczyna, within Kluczbork County, Opole Voivodeship, in south-western Poland.
