= Roszkowice, Kluczbork County =

Roszkowice
- Village
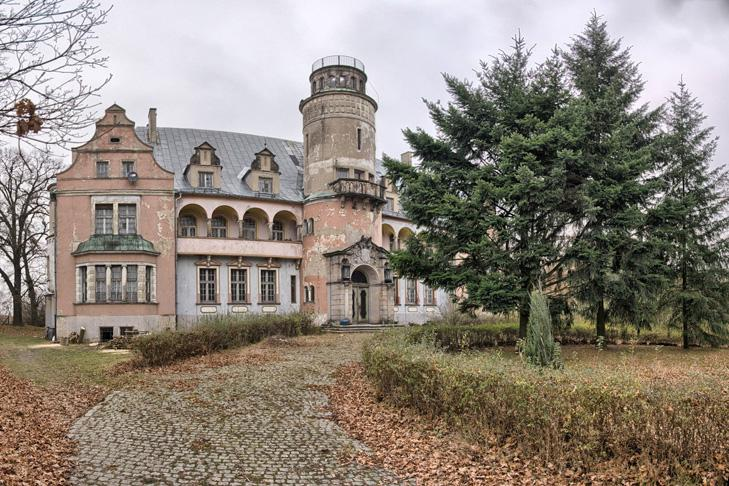
- Palace

- Location within Poland
- Coordinates: 51°7′N 18°16′E
- Country: Poland
- Voivodeship: Opole
- County: Kluczbork
- Gmina: Byczyna

Roszkowice [rɔʂkɔˈvit͡sɛ] is a village in the administrative district of Gmina Byczyna, within Kluczbork County, Opole Voivodeship, in south-western Poland.
