= Pszczonki =

- Village
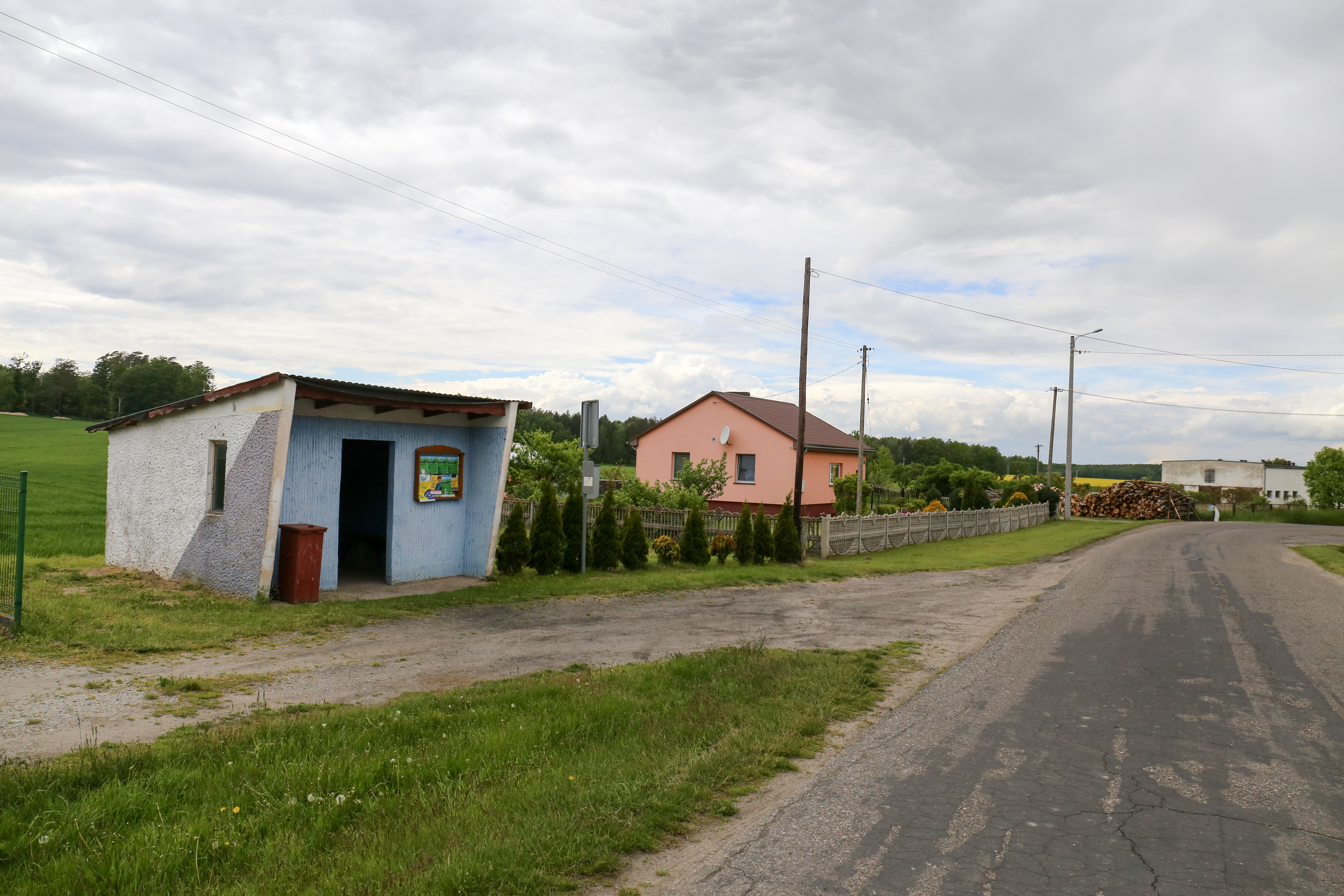

- Location within Poland
- Coordinates: 51°03′31″N 18°17′21″E
- Country: Poland
- Voivodeship: Opole
- County: Kluczbork
- Gmina: Byczyna
- Website: www.pszczonki.ovh.org

Pszczonki [ˈpʂt͡ʂɔnki] is a village in the administrative district of Gmina Byczyna, within Kluczbork County, Opole Voivodeship, in south-western Poland.
