= Raków, Greater Poland Voivodeship =

Raków
- Village
- Location within Poland
- Coordinates: 51°12′N 18°6′E
- Country: Poland
- Voivodeship: Greater Poland
- County: Kępno
- Gmina: Łęka Opatowska
- Time zone: UTC+1 (CET)
  - Summer (DST): UTC+2 (CEST)
- Vehicle registration: PKE

Raków [ˈrakuf] is a village in the administrative district of Gmina Łęka Opatowska, within Kępno County, Greater Poland Voivodeship, in west-central Poland.

== History ==
In 1360, the village was granted by Bishop of Wrocław Przecław of Pogorzela to canon of Poznań Stefan Gromassy. Later on, it was a private village of Polish nobility, including the Rakowski and Siemiański families.

Following the joint German-Soviet invasion of Poland, which started World War II in September 1939, the village was occupied by Germany until 1945. In September 1941, the German gendarmerie carried out expulsions of Poles, who were deported to a temporary transit camp in nearby Opatów, while their houses were handed over to new German colonists as part of the Lebensraum policy. The Poles were soon enslaved as forced labour and either sent to Germany or to German colonists in the county.
