= Borek, Kluczbork County =

Borek
- Village
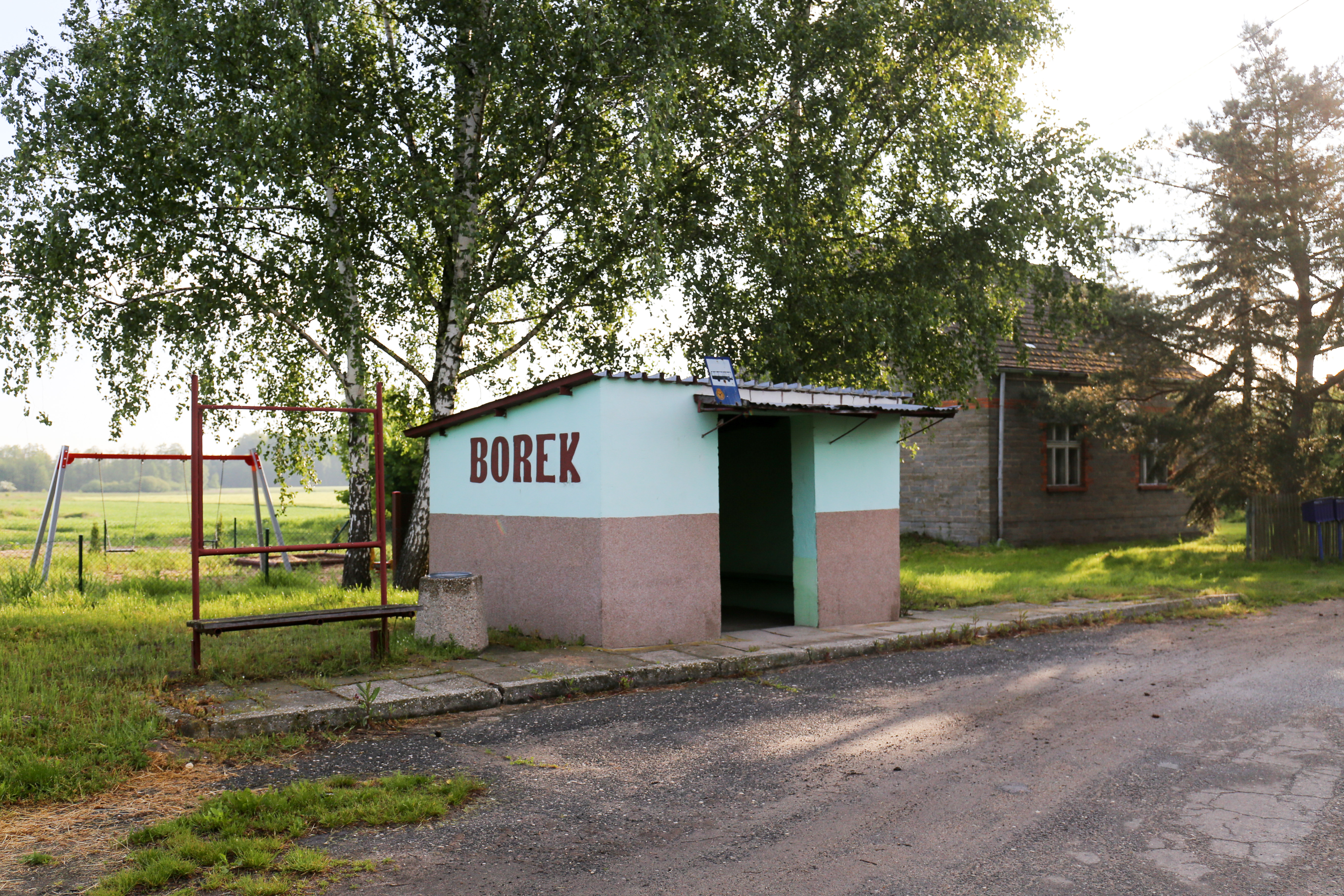
- The village's bus stop

- Location within Poland
- Coordinates: 51°08′20″N 18°16′29″E
- Country: Poland
- Voivodeship: Opole
- County: Kluczbork
- Gmina: Byczyna

Borek [ˈbɔrɛk] is a village in the administrative district of Gmina Byczyna, within Kluczbork County, Opole Voivodeship, in south-western Poland.
