= Sierosławice, Opole Voivodeship =

Sierosławice
- Village
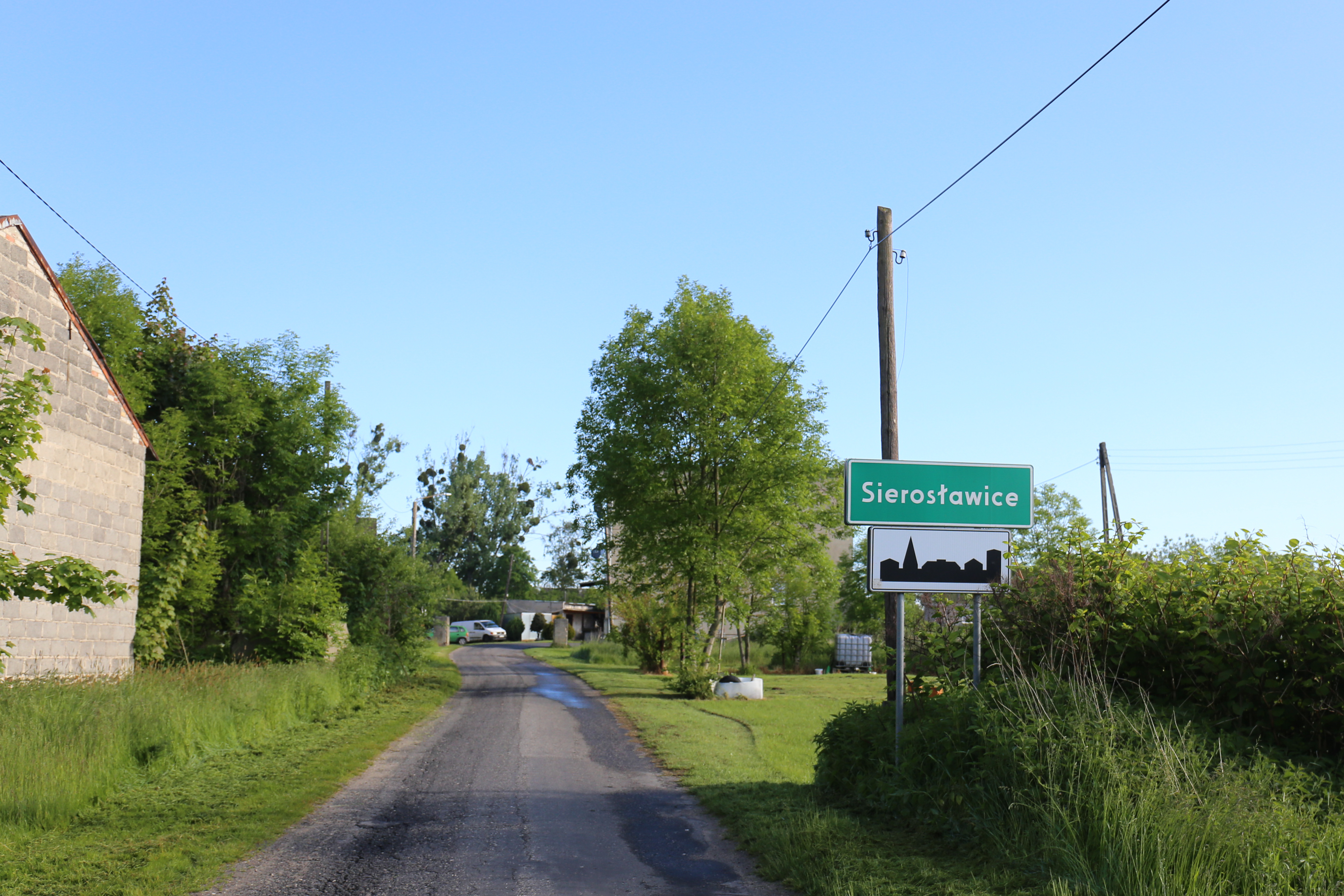

- Location within Poland
- Coordinates: 51°07′23″N 18°17′33″E
- Country: Poland
- Voivodeship: Opole
- County: Kluczbork
- Gmina: Byczyna

Sierosławice [ɕɛrɔswaˈvit͡sɛ] is a village in the administrative district of Gmina Byczyna, within Kluczbork County, Opole Voivodeship, in south-western Poland.
