= Wojsławice, Opole Voivodeship =

Wojsławice
- Village
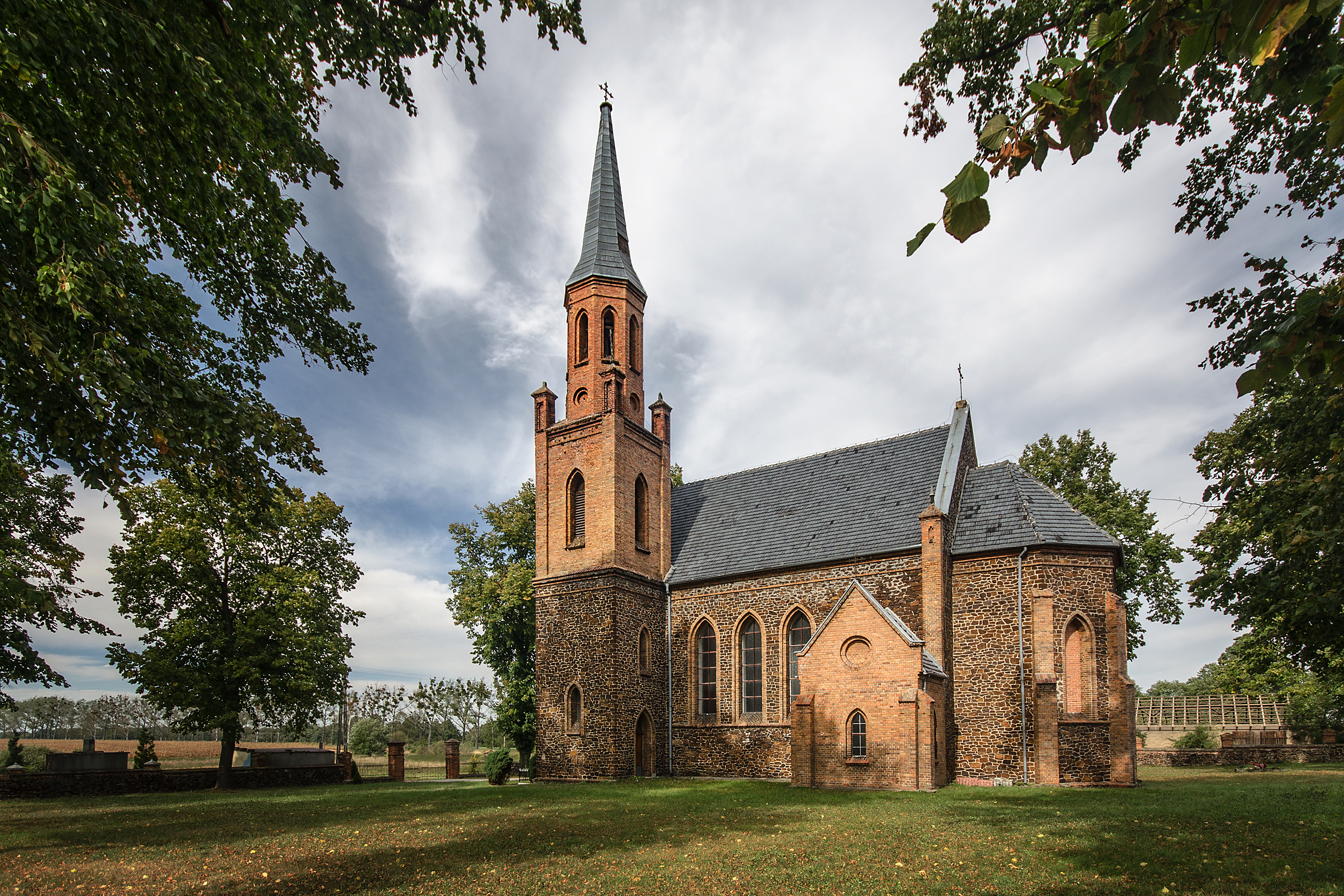

- Location within Poland
- Coordinates: 51°06′24″N 18°18′29″E
- Country: Poland
- Voivodeship: Opole
- County: Kluczbork
- Gmina: Byczyna

Wojsławice [vɔi̯swaˈvit͡sɛ] is a village in the administrative district of Gmina Byczyna, within Kluczbork County, Opole Voivodeship, in south-western Poland.
