= Siemianice, Greater Poland Voivodeship =

Siemianice
- Village
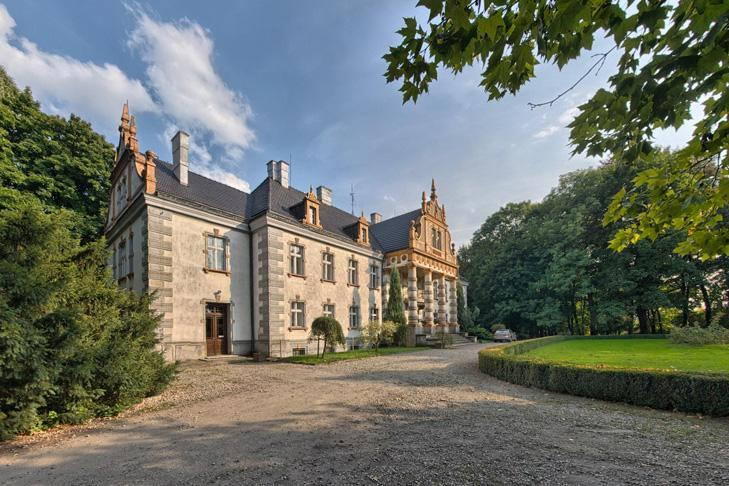

- Location within Poland
- Coordinates: 51°10′46″N 18°08′32″E
- Country: Poland
- Voivodeship: Greater Poland
- County: Kępno
- Gmina: Łęka Opatowska
- Population (approx.): 768
- Website: http://www.leka-opatowska.pl/index.php?pid=82

Siemianice [ɕɛmjaˈnit͡sɛ] is a village in the administrative district of Gmina Łęka Opatowska, within Kępno County, Greater Poland Voivodeship, in west-central Poland.

The village has an approximate population of 768.
