= Łęka Opatowska =

- Village
- Location within Poland
- Coordinates: 51°13′N 18°6′E
- Country: Poland
- Voivodeship: Greater Poland
- County: Kępno
- Gmina: Łęka Opatowska

Łęka Opatowska ([ˈwɛnka ɔpaˈtɔfska]) (German: Lenka) is a village in Kępno County, Greater Poland Voivodeship, in west-central Poland. It is the seat of the gmina (administrative district) called Gmina Łęka Opatowska.
