= Trzcinica, Kępno County =

Trzcinica
- Village
- Location within Poland
- Coordinates: 51°10′2″N 18°0′17″E
- Country: Poland
- Voivodeship: Greater Poland
- County: Kępno
- Gmina: Trzcinica

Trzcinica [tʂt͡ɕiˈnit͡sa] is a village in Kępno County, Greater Poland Voivodeship, in west-central Poland. It is the seat of the gmina (administrative district) called Gmina Trzcinica.
