= Bralin, Greater Poland Voivodeship =

Bralin
- Village
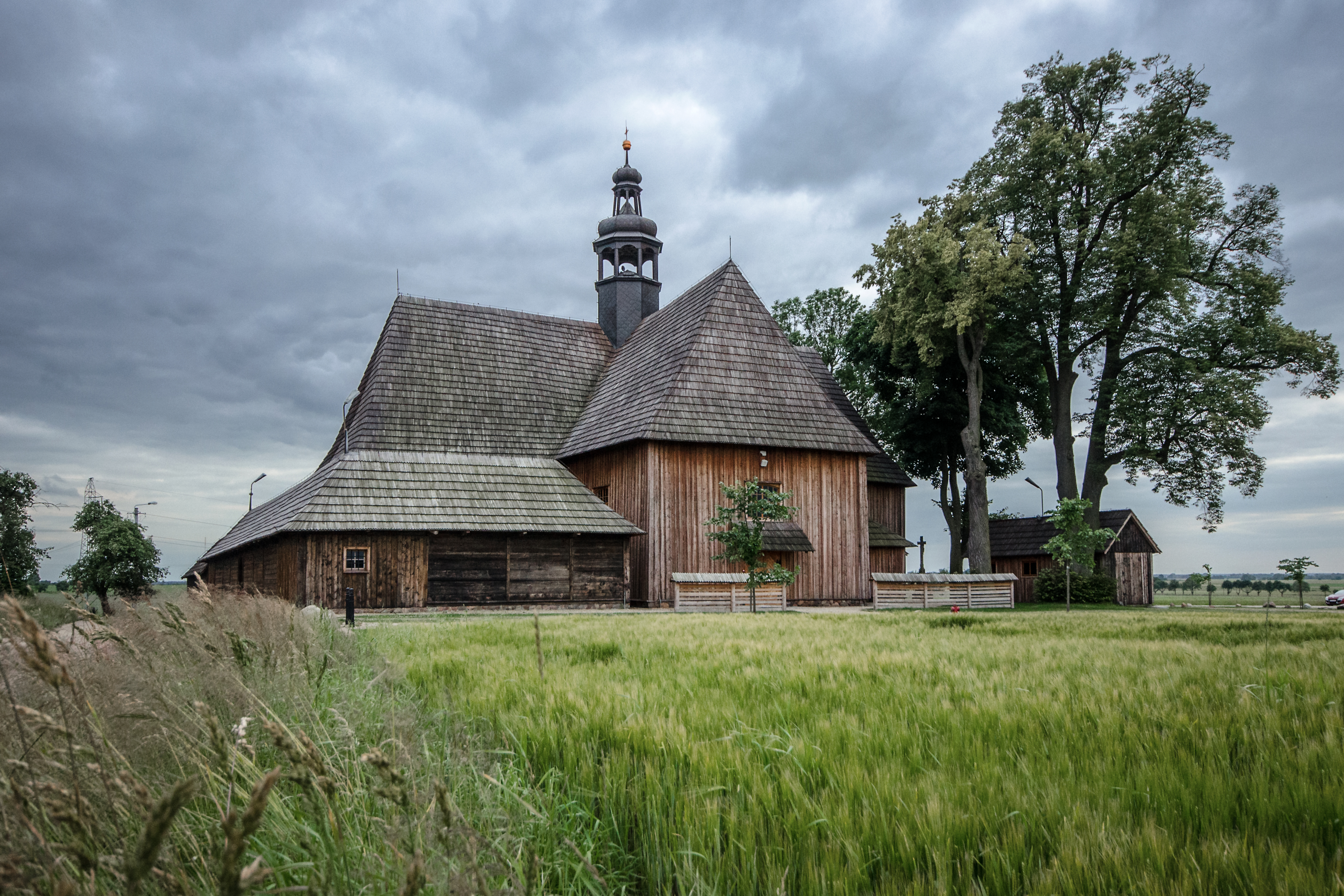
- Church of the Nativity of the Virgin Mary Na Pólku

- Location within Poland
- Coordinates: 51°17′N 17°54′E
- Country: Poland
- Voivodeship: Greater Poland
- County: Kępno
- Gmina: Bralin

Population
  - Total: 2,500
- Time zone: UTC+1 (CET)
  - Summer (DST): UTC+2 (CEST)
- Vehicle registration: PKE
- Website: http://www.bralin.iap.pl

Bralin [ˈbralin] is a village in Kępno County, Greater Poland Voivodeship, in south-central Poland. It is the seat of the gmina (administrative district) called Gmina Bralin.

== History ==
Following the joint German-Soviet invasion of Poland, which started World War II in September 1939, it was occupied by Nazi Germany until 1945, and the Polish population was persecuted. In 1939, the occupiers murdered the local sołtys (head of administration). In 1939, the Germans carried out the first expulsions of Poles, who were deported in freight trains to Mińsk Mazowiecki in the more-eastern part of German-occupied Poland. The occupiers established and operated a forced labour subcamp of the Stalag XXI-A prisoner-of-war camp in the village.
