= Piotrówka, Greater Poland Voivodeship =

Piotrówka
- Village
- Location within Poland
- Coordinates: 51°10′19″N 17°56′16″E
- Country: Poland
- Voivodeship: Greater Poland
- County: Kępno
- Gmina: Trzcinica
- Population: 390

Piotrówka [pjɔˈtrufka] is a village in the administrative district of Gmina Trzcinica, within Kępno County, Greater Poland Voivodeship, in west-central Poland.
