= Janówka, Opole Voivodeship =

Janówka
- Village
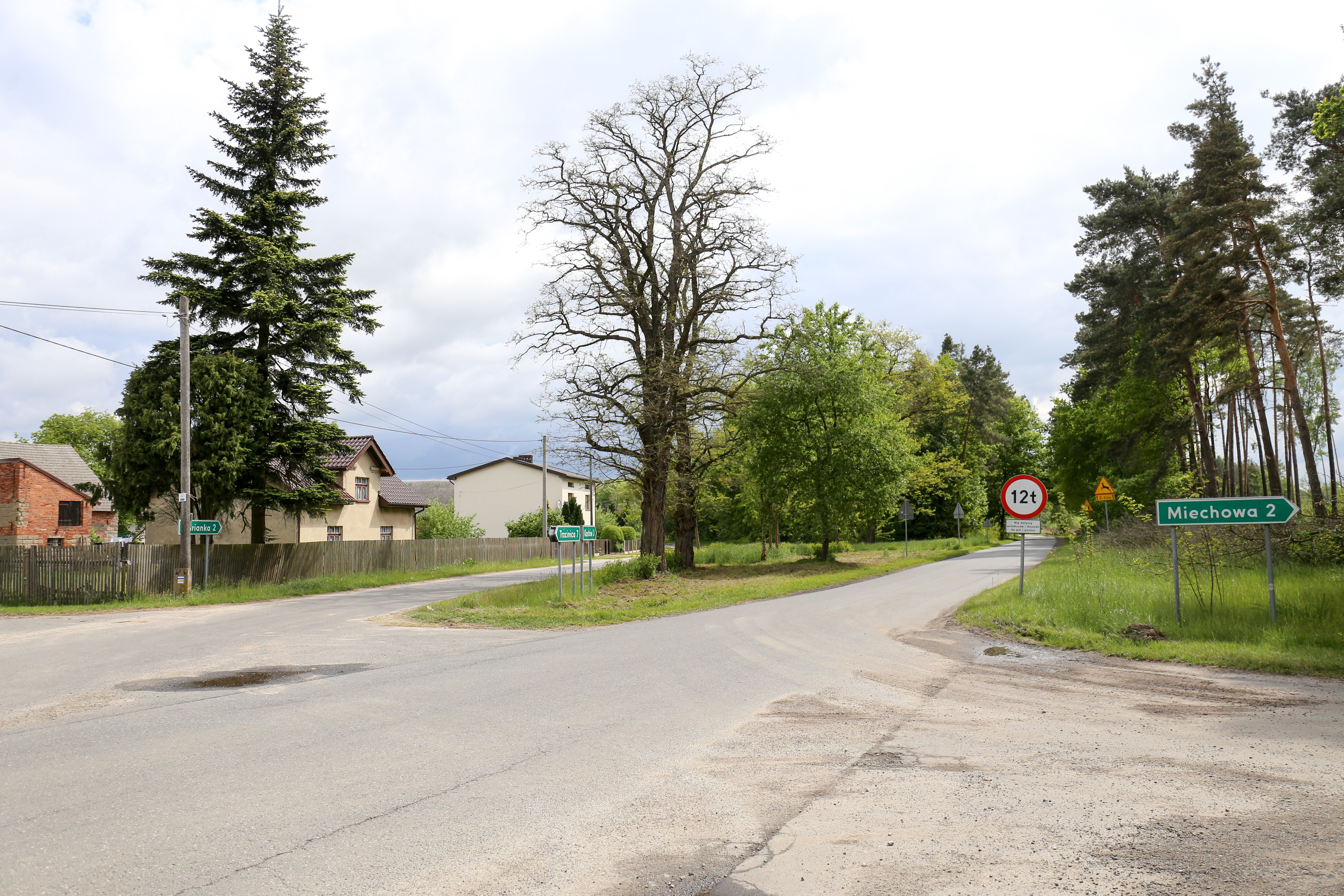

- Location within Poland
- Coordinates: 51°9′N 18°4′E
- Country: Poland
- Voivodeship: Opole
- County: Kluczbork
- Gmina: Byczyna
- Population: 250

Janówka [jaˈnufka] is a village in the administrative district of Gmina Byczyna, within Kluczbork County, Opole Voivodeship, in south-western Poland.
