= Gmina Bralin =

Gmina Bralin Bralin Commune
- Gmina
- Flag Coat of arms

- Coordinates (Bralin): 51°17′N 17°54′E
- Country: Poland
- Voivodeship: Greater Poland
- County: Kępno
- Seat: Bralin

Area
  - Total: 85.16 km^{2} (32.88 sq mi)

Population (2006)
  - Total: 5,644
  - Density: 66.28/km^{2} (171.7/sq mi)
- Website: http://www.bralin.pl

Gmina Bralin is a rural gmina (administrative district) in Kępno County, Greater Poland Voivodeship, in west-central Poland. Its seat is the village of Bralin, which lies approximately 6 kilometres (4 mi) west of Kępno and 142 km (88 mi) south-east of the regional capital Poznań.

The gmina covers an area of 85.16 square kilometres (32.9 sq mi), and as of 2006 its total population is 5,644.

== Villages ==
Gmina Bralin contains the villages and settlements of Bralin, Chojęcin, Czermin, Działosze, Gola, Mnichowice, Nosale, Nowa Wieś Książęca, Tabor Mały, Tabor Wielki and Weronikopole.

== Neighbouring gminas ==
Gmina Bralin is bordered by the gminas of Baranów, Kępno, Kobyla Góra, Perzów and Rychtal.
