= Jaśkowice, Kluczbork County =

Jaśkowice
- Village
- Location within Poland
- Coordinates: 51°07′37″N 18°12′54″E
- Country: Poland
- Voivodeship: Opole
- County: Kluczbork
- Gmina: Byczyna

Jaśkowice [jaɕkɔˈvit͡sɛ] is a village in the administrative district of Gmina Byczyna, within Kluczbork County, Opole Voivodeship, in south-western Poland.
