= Jakubowice, Kluczbork County =

Jakubowice
- Village
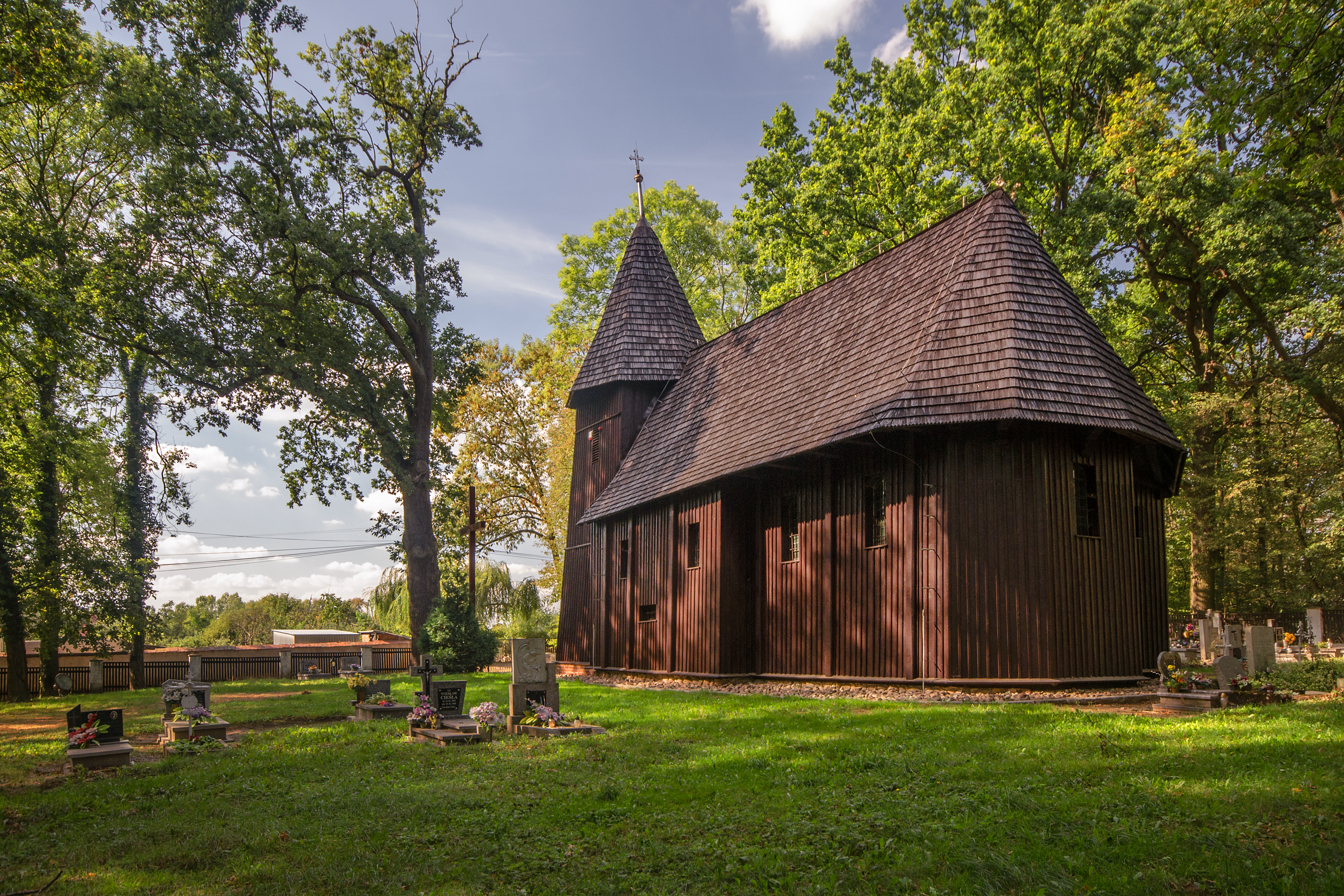
- Virgin Mary Queen of Poland church built in 1585.

- Location within Poland
- Coordinates: 51°5′N 18°7′E
- Country: Poland
- Voivodeship: Opole
- County: Kluczbork
- Gmina: Byczyna

Jakubowice (German Jacobsdorf) [jakubɔˈvit͡sɛ] is a village in the administrative district of Gmina Byczyna, Kluczbork County, Opole Voivodeship, in south-western Poland.
