= Rakow =

Rakow may refer to:

== People ==
- Benzion Rakow (1925–1985), rabbi in London, England
- Bezalel Rakow (1927–2003), rabbi of Gateshead, England
- Ed Rakow (1935–2000), American baseball player
- Edward F. Rakow (1861–1942)
- Mary Rakow, American novelist

== Places ==
=== Poland ===
- Raków, Kielce County, village in Świętokrzyskie Voivodeship, historical centre of Polish Unitarianism
- Raków, Częstochowa, district of Częstochowa
- Raków, Greater Poland Voivodeship, village in Kępno County
- Raków, Łódź Voivodeship, village in Piotrków County
- Raków, Polkowice County, village in Lower Silesian Voivodeship
- Raków, Trzebnica County, village in Lower Silesian Voivodeship
- Raków, Wrocław County, village in Lower Silesian Voivodeship
- Raków, Lubusz Voivodeship, village in Świebodzin County
- Raków, Gostynin County, village in Masovian Voivodeship
- Raków, Warsaw, a neighbourhood in Warsaw, Masovian Voivodeship
- Raków, Opole Voivodeship, village in Głubczyce County
- Raków, Jędrzejów County, village in Świętokrzyskie Voivodeship

=== Belarus ===
- Rakaŭ, urban settlement in Valozhyn Raion, Minsk Region

== Sports ==
- Raków Częstochowa, a football club from Częstochowa, Poland

== See also ==
- Rakov (disambiguation)
