= Gmina Łęka Opatowska =

Gmina Łęka Opatowska Łęka Opatowska Commune
- Gmina
- Flag Coat of arms

- Coordinates (Łęka Opatowska): 51°13′N 18°6′E
- Country: Poland
- Voivodeship: Greater Poland
- County: Kępno
- Seat: Łęka Opatowska

Area
  - Total: 77.54 km^{2} (29.94 sq mi)

Population (2006)
  - Total: 5,219
  - Density: 67.31/km^{2} (174.3/sq mi)
- Website: http://www.leka-opatowska.pl

Gmina Łęka Opatowska is a rural gmina (administrative district) in Kępno County, Greater Poland Voivodeship, in west central Poland. Its seat is the village of Łęka Opatowska, which lies approximately 11 kilometres (7 mi) south-east of Kępno and 155 km (96 mi) south-east of the regional capital Poznań. The Gmina covers an area of 77.54 square kilometres (29.9 sq mi), and as of 2006 its total population was 5,219.

== Villages ==
Gmina Łęka Opatowska contains the villages and settlements of Biadaszki, Klasak, Kuźnica Słupska, Łęka Opatowska, Lipie, Marianka Siemieńska, Opatów, Opatowiec, Piaski, Raków, Siemianice, Stogniew, Szalonka, Trzebień, Wesoła, and Zmyślona Słupska.

== Neighbouring gminas ==
Gmina Łęka Opatowska is bordered by the gminas of Baranów, Bolesławiec, Byczyna, Trzcinica, and Wieruszów.
