= Gmina Byczyna =

Gmina Byczyna Byczyna Commune
- Gmina
- Flag Coat of arms
- Interactive map of Gmina Byczyna
- Coordinates (Byczyna): 51°7′N 18°13′E
- Country: Poland
- Voivodeship: Opole
- County: Kluczbork
- Seat: Byczyna

Area
  - Total: 182.89 km^{2} (70.61 sq mi)

Population (2019-06-30)
  - Total: 9,305
  - Density: 50.88/km^{2} (131.8/sq mi)
  - Urban: 3,582
  - Rural: 5,723
- Website: http://byczyna.pl

Gmina Byczyna is an urban-rural gmina (administrative district) in Kluczbork County, Opole Voivodeship, in south-western Poland. Its seat is the town of Byczyna, which lies approximately 15 kilometres (9 mi) north of Kluczbork and 54 km (34 mi) north of the regional capital Opole.

The gmina covers an area of 182.89 square kilometres (70.6 sq mi), and as of 2019 its total population is 9,305.

== Villages ==
Apart from the town of Byczyna, Gmina Byczyna contains the villages and settlements of Biskupice, Borek, Chudoba, Ciecierzyn, Dobiercice, Gołkowice, Gosław, Jakubowice, Janówka, Jaśkowice, Kochłowice, Kostów, Miechowa, Nasale, Paruszowice, Pogorzałka, Polanowice, Proślice, Pszczonki, Roszkowice, Sarnów, Sierosławice and Wojsławice.

== Neighbouring gminas ==
Gmina Byczyna is bordered by the gminas of Bolesławiec, Gorzów Śląski, Kluczbork, Łęka Opatowska, Łubnice, Trzcinica and Wołczyn.

== Twin towns – sister cities ==
Gmina Byczyna is twinned with:

- Csókakő, Hungary
