= Gmina Trzcinica =

Gmina Trzcinica Trzcinica Commune
- Gmina
- Coat of arms

- Coordinates (Trzcinica): 51°10′2″N 18°0′17″E
- Country: Poland
- Voivodeship: Greater Poland
- County: Kępno
- Seat: Trzcinica

Area
  - Total: 75.14 km^{2} (29.01 sq mi)

Population (2006)
  - Total: 4,703
  - Density: 62.59/km^{2} (162.1/sq mi)

Gmina Trzcinica is a rural gmina (administrative district) in Kępno County, Greater Poland Voivodeship, in west-central Poland. Its seat is the village of Trzcinica, which lies approximately 13 kilometres (8 mi) south of Kępno and 156 km (97 mi) south-east of the regional capital Poznań.

The gmina covers an area of 75.14 square kilometres (29.0 sq mi), and as of 2006 its total population is 4,703.

== Villages ==
Gmina Trzcinica contains the villages and settlements of Aniołka Druga, Aniołka Pierwsza, Aniołka-Parcele, Borek, Dzierżążnik, Granice, Ignacówka Druga, Ignacówka Pierwsza, Ignacówka Trzecia, Jelenia Głowa, Kuźnica Trzcińska, Kwasielina, Laski, Laski-Tartak, Nowa Wieś, Piotrówka, Pomiany, Różyczka, Siemionka, Smardze, Teklin, Trzcinica and Wodziczna.

== Neighbouring gminas ==
Gmina Trzcinica is bordered by the gminas of Baranów, Byczyna, Łęka Opatowska, Rychtal and Wołczyn.
