= Gosław, Opole Voivodeship =

Gosław
- Village
- Location within Poland
- Coordinates: 51°4′58″N 18°16′47″E
- Country: Poland
- Voivodeship: Opole
- County: Kluczbork
- Gmina: Byczyna

Gosław [ˈɡɔswaf] is a village in the administrative district of Gmina Byczyna, within Kluczbork County, Opole Voivodeship, in south-western Poland.
