= Chudoba, Gmina Byczyna =

Chudoba
- Village
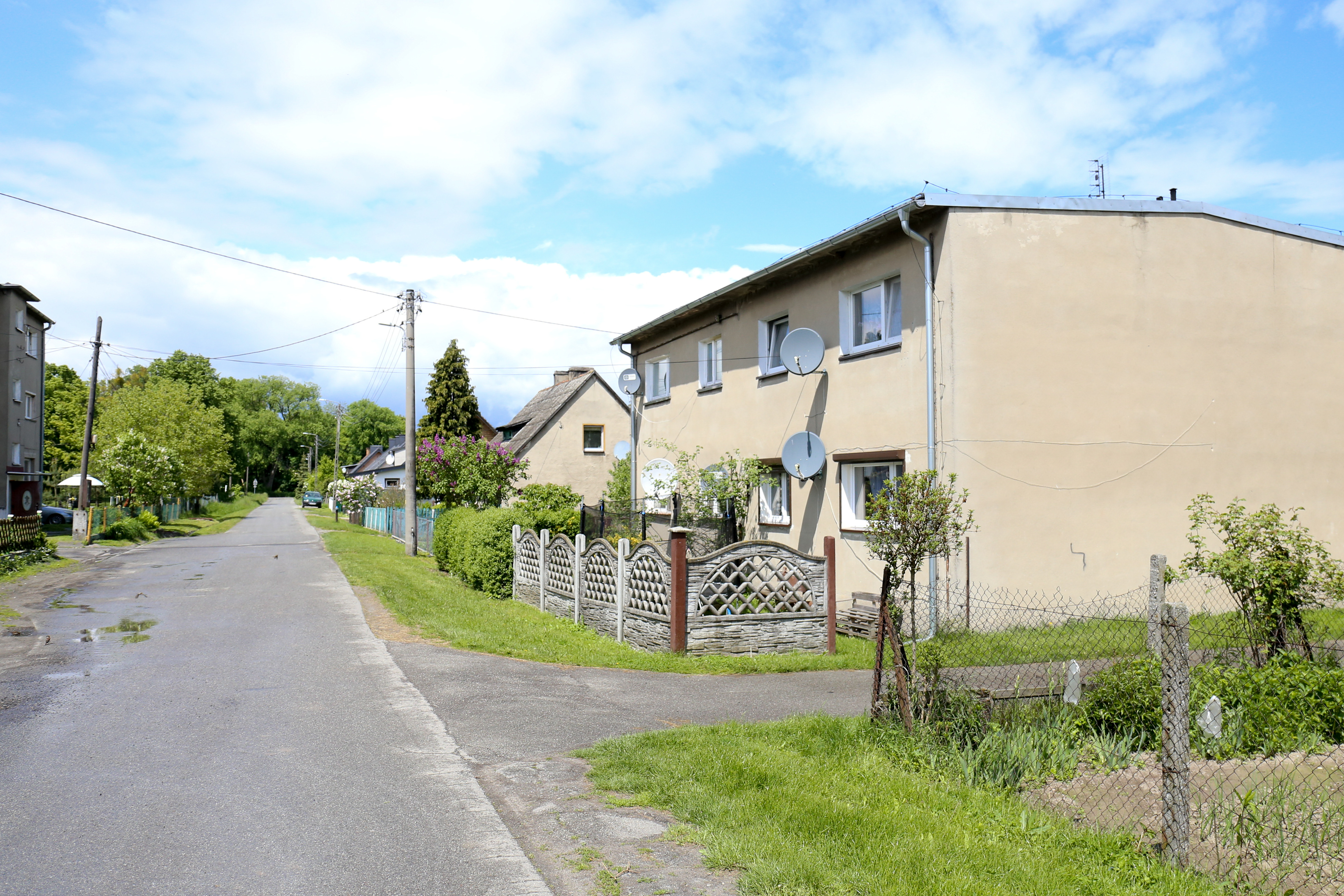

- Location within Poland
- Coordinates: 51°3′N 18°13′E
- Country: Poland
- Voivodeship: Opole
- County: Kluczbork
- Gmina: Byczyna
- Population: 132

Chudoba [xuˈdɔba] is a village in the administrative district of Gmina Byczyna, within Kluczbork County, Opole Voivodeship, in south-western Poland.
