= Rakoff =

Rakoff is a surname a transliteration variant of the Russian surname Rakov. Notable people with the surname include:

- Alvin Rakoff (born 1927), Canadian television, stage and film director
- David Rakoff (1964–2012), Canadian-born American writer
- Jed S. Rakoff (born 1943), American judge
- Joanna Rakoff (born 1972), American journalist, poet, critic and novelist
- Simon Rakoff (born 1960), Canadian comedian
- Todd Rakoff (born 1946), American legal scholar
