= Kępno County =

Kępno Powiat kępiński
- County
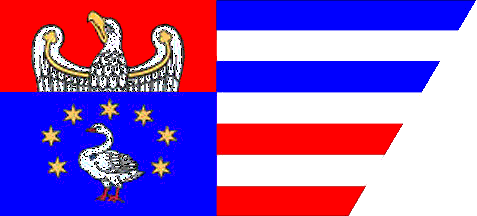
- Flag Coat of arms

- Location within the voivodeship
- Coordinates (Kępno): 51°17′N 17°59′E
- County: Poland
- Voivodeship: Greater Poland
- Seat: Kępno
- Gminas: Total 7: Gmina Baranów; Gmina Bralin; Gmina Kępno; Gmina Łęka Opatowska; Gmina Perzów; Gmina Rychtal; Gmina Trzcinica

Area
  - Total: 608.39 km^{2} (234.90 sq mi)

Population (2006)
  - Total: 55,335
  - Density: 90.953/km^{2} (235.57/sq mi)
  - Urban: 14,710
  - Rural: 40,625
- Car plates: PKE
- Website: www.kepno.com.pl

Kępno County (Polish: powiat kępiński) is a unit of territorial administration and local government (powiat) in Greater Poland Voivodeship, west-central Poland. It came into being on January 1, 1999, as a result of the Polish local government reforms passed in 1998. Its administrative seat and only town is Kępno, which lies 144 kilometres (89 mi) south-east of the regional capital Poznań.

The county covers an area of 608.39 square kilometres (234.9 sq mi). As of 2006 its total population is 55,335, out of which the population of Kępno is 14,710 and the rural population is 40,625.

== Neighbouring counties ==
Kępno County is bordered by Ostrzeszów County to the north, Wieruszów County to the east, Kluczbork County to the south, Namysłów County to the south-west and Oleśnica County to the west.

== Administrative divisions ==
The county is subdivided into seven gminas (one urban-rural and six rural). These are listed in the following table, in descending order of population.

Gmina	Type	Area (km^{2})	Population (2006)	Seat
Gmina Kępno	urban-rural	124.0	24,308	Kępno
Gmina Baranów	rural	74.3	7,495	Baranów
Gmina Bralin	rural	85.2	5,644	Bralin
Gmina Łęka Opatowska	rural	77.5	5,219	Łęka Opatowska
Gmina Trzcinica	rural	75.1	4,703	Trzcinica
Gmina Rychtal	rural	96.8	4,041	Rychtal
Gmina Perzów	rural	75.5	3,925	Perzów
