= Kujakowice =

Kujakowice may refer to the following neighbouring villages in Gmina Kluczbork in south-western Poland:

- Kujakowice Górne ("upper Kujakowice")
- Kujakowice Dolne ("lower Kujakowice")
