= Ligota Dolna =

Ligota Dolna may refer to the following villages in Poland:

- Ligota Dolna, Kluczbork County
- Ligota Dolna, Strzelce County
