= Maciejów, Opole Voivodeship =

Maciejów
- Village
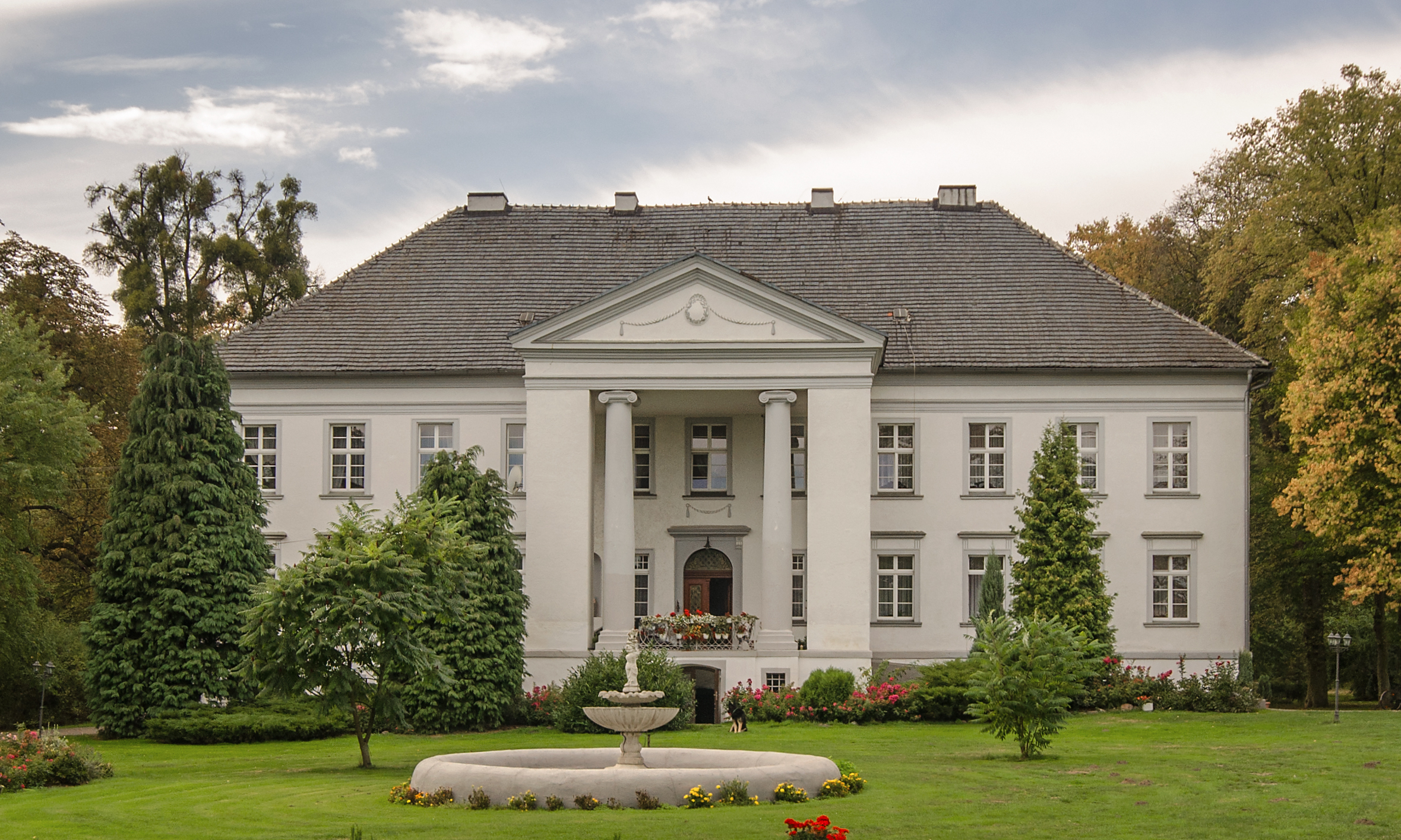
- Maciejów Palace

- Location within Poland
- Coordinates: 51°1′56″N 18°16′47″E
- Country: Poland
- Voivodeship: Opole
- County: Kluczbork
- Gmina: Kluczbork

Population
  - Total: 180
- Time zone: UTC+1 (CET)
  - Summer (DST): UTC+2 (CEST)
- Vehicle registration: OKL
- Website: www.maciejow.kluczbork.pl

Maciejów [maˈt͡ɕɛjuf] is a village in the administrative district of Gmina Kluczbork, within Kluczbork County, Opole Voivodeship, in southern Poland.
