= Przybkowice =

- Village
- Location within Poland
- Coordinates: 51°00′11″N 18°19′45″E
- Country: Poland
- Voivodeship: Opole
- County: Kluczbork
- Gmina: Kluczbork
- Time zone: UTC+1 (CET)
  - Summer (DST): UTC+2 (CEST)
- Vehicle registration: OKL

Przybkowice [pʂɨpkɔˈvit͡sɛ] is a village in the administrative district of Gmina Kluczbork, within Kluczbork County, Opole Voivodeship, in southern Poland.
