= Kluczbork =

Town in Opole Voivodeship, Poland

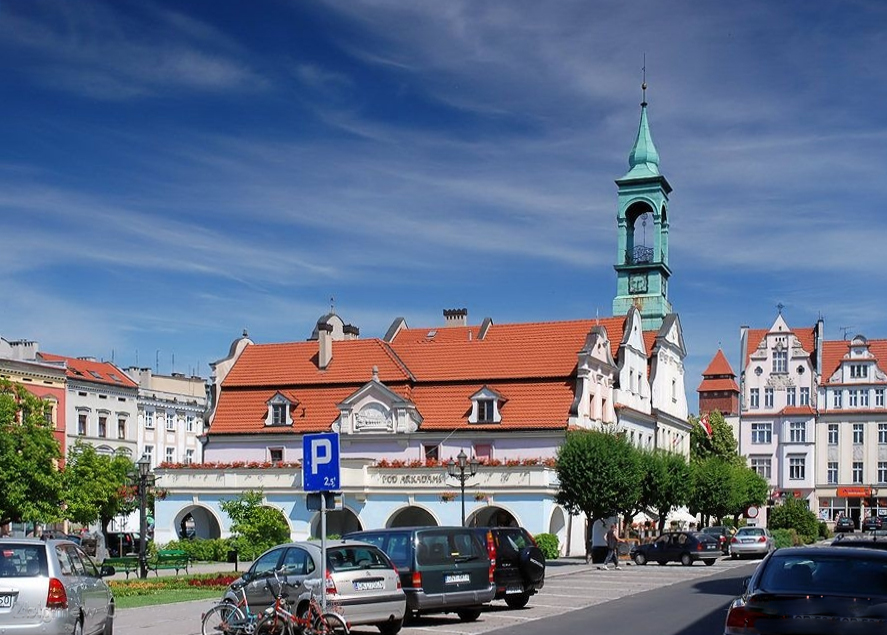
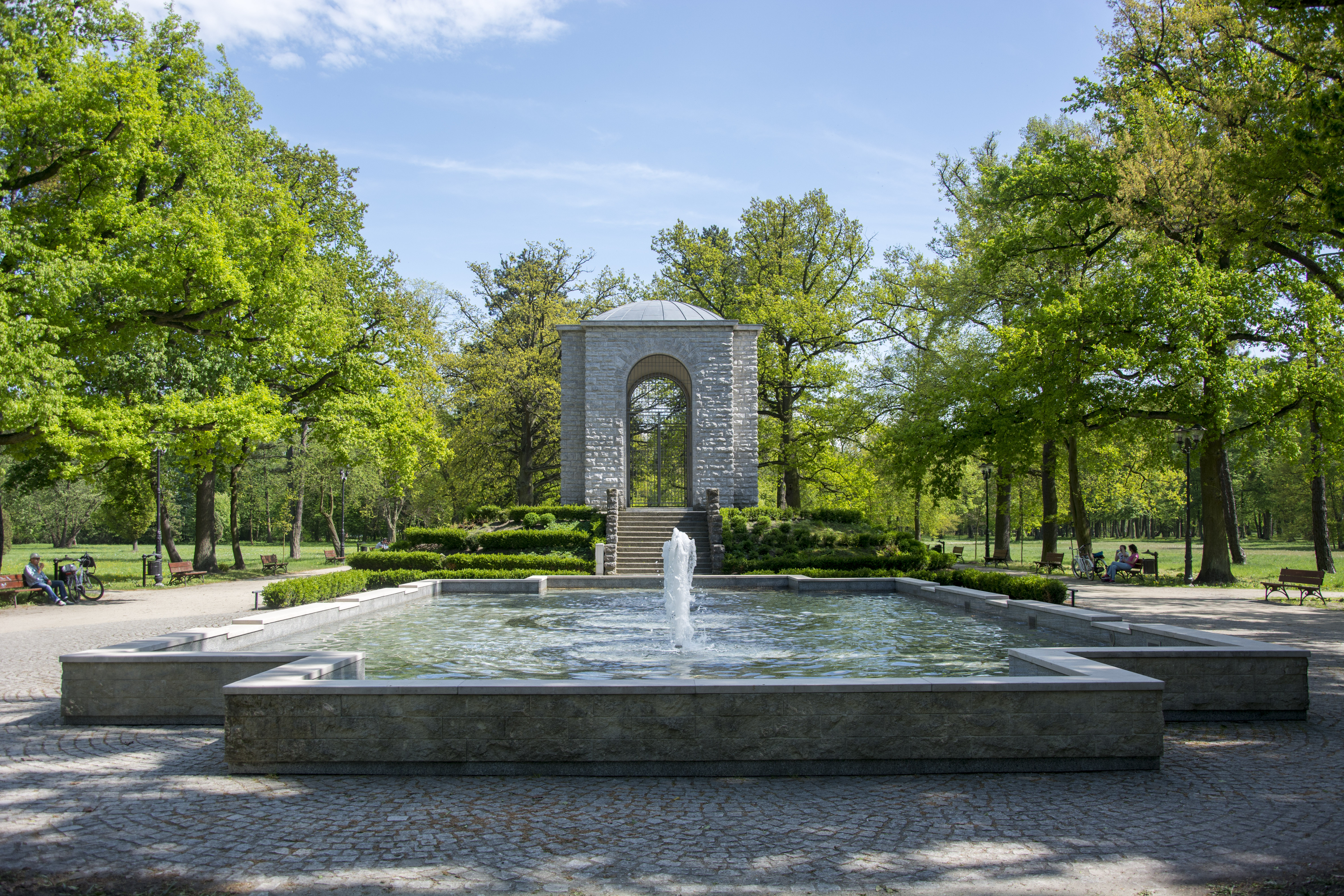
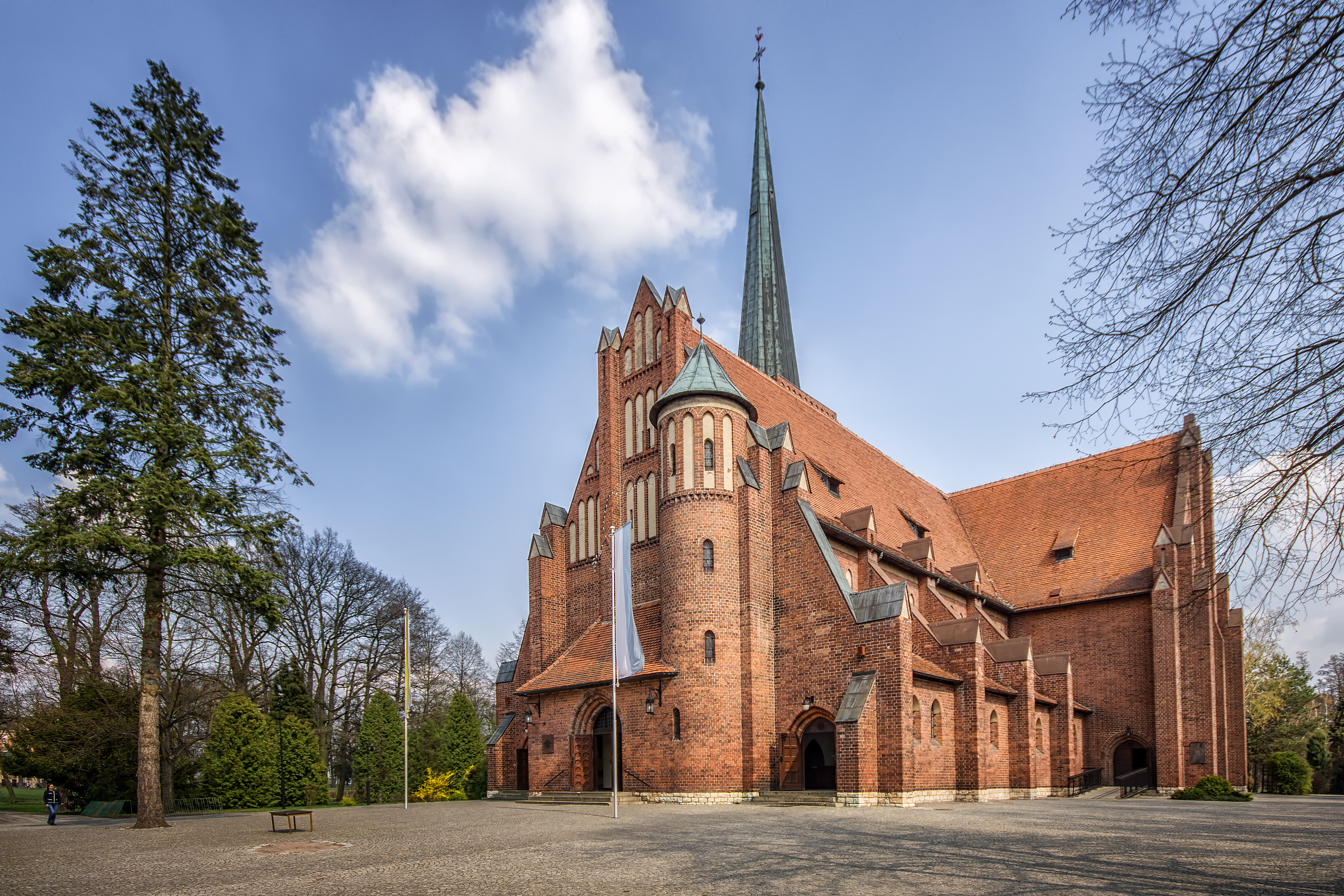
- Kluczbork Town Hall City Park Our Lady Help of Christians Church

- Flag Coat of arms

- Location within Poland
- Coordinates: 50°59′N 18°13′E
- Country: Poland
- Voivodeship: Opole
- County: Kluczbork
- Gmina: Kluczbork
- Established: 13th century
- Town rights: 1252

Government
  - Mayor: Jarosław Kielar (OKS)

Area
  - Total: 12.35 km^{2} (4.77 sq mi)
- Elevation: 190 m (620 ft)

Population (2019-06-30)
  - Total: 23,554
  - Density: 1,952.3/km^{2} (5,056/sq mi)
- Time zone: UTC+1 (CET)
  - Summer (DST): UTC+2 (CEST)
- Postal code: 46–200, 46–203
- Area code: +48 77
- Car plates: OKL
- Website: https://www.kluczbork.eu

Kluczbork [ˈklud͡ʐbɔrk] (German: Kreuzburg O.S., Silesian: Kluczborek) is a town in southern Poland with 23,554 inhabitants as of 2019, situated in the Opole Voivodeship. It is the capital of Kluczbork County and an important railroad junction, where the major rail line from Katowice splits into two directions – westwards to Wrocław and northwards to Poznań. It is also connected with Fosowskie.

== History ==
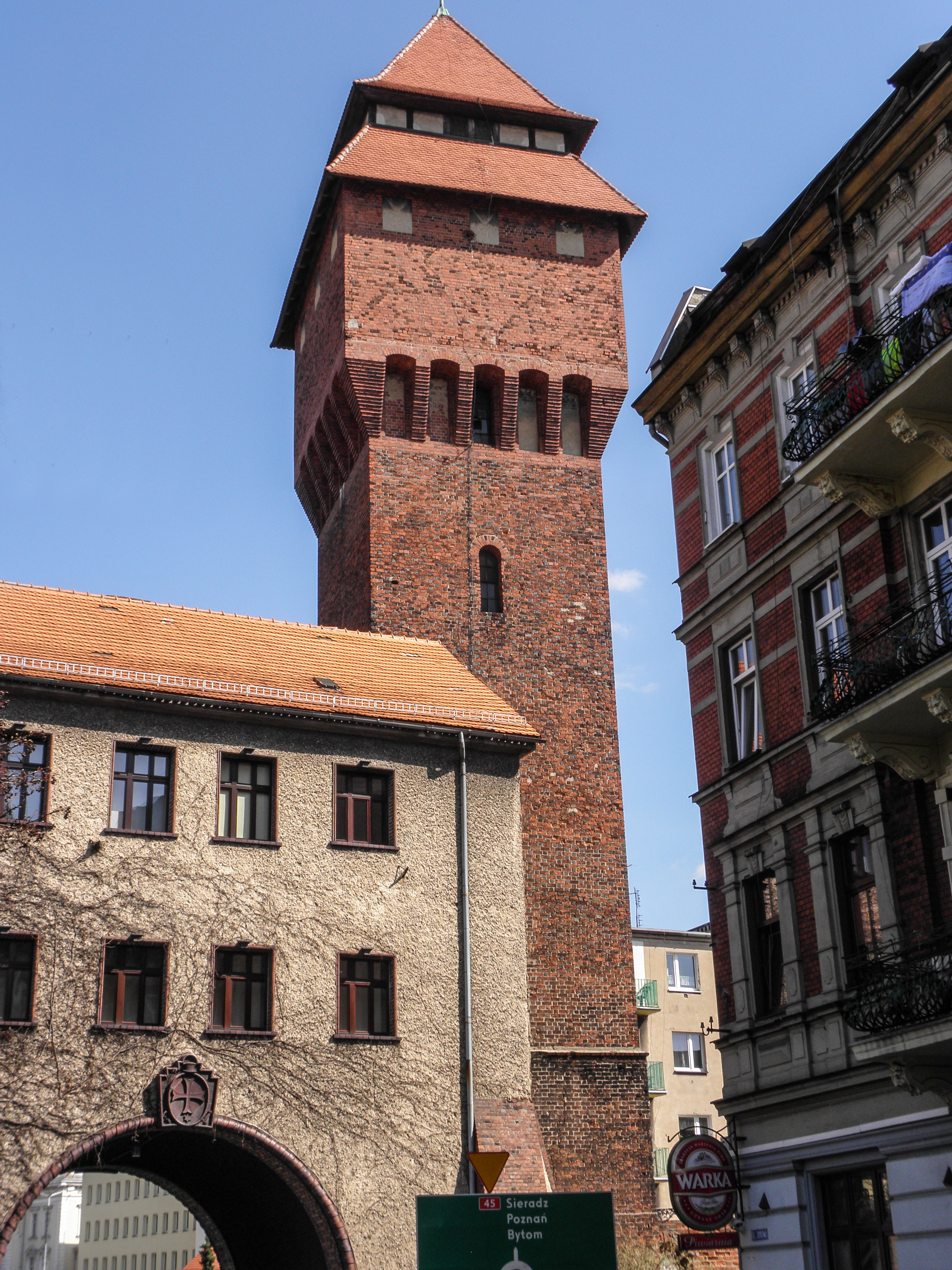
Kraków Gate Tower

Archaeologists have determined that a settlement existed at the location of present-day Kluczbork by 1000–800 BCE. The Germanic Sciri and Bastarnae settled in the vicinity, and were followed c. 100 BCE by Celts and various Germanic tribes, including Silingi and Vandals. The latter left Silesia c. 400 and West Slavs came to the region in the 7th century (see Silesians). In the late 10th century the Silesian territory was included in the emerging Polish state by its first historic ruler Mieszko I.

In the 13th century the Knights of the Cross with the Red Star acquired territory in Silesia, including the villages of Młodoszów, Kuniów, and Chocianowice. The Knights built a settlement on 2 November 1252. Named Cruceburg (later spelled Creutzburg, Creuzburg, Kreuzburg), it received Magdeburg rights on 26 February 1253, now accepted as the official date of the town's foundation. The Knights adjudicated in the town until 1274, when it started to be administered by a vogt of local Silesian dukes and juries were introduced. As a result of the dynastic fragmentation of Poland, Kluczbork was part of various Polish duchies ruled by the Piast dynasty: Duchy of Silesia until 1293, Duchy of Głogów until 1312, Duchy of Oleśnica until 1323 and Duchy of Legnica until 1341, when it came under direct rule of the King of Poland, Casimir III the Great. In 1356 it passed to the Czech Crown, and continued to belong to various duchies ruled by the Piast dynasty. From 1536 it was part of the Piast-ruled Duchy of Brzeg until its dissolution in 1675. Afterwards it was incorporated into the Habsburg monarchy, as part of the Habsburg-ruled Czech Kingdom.

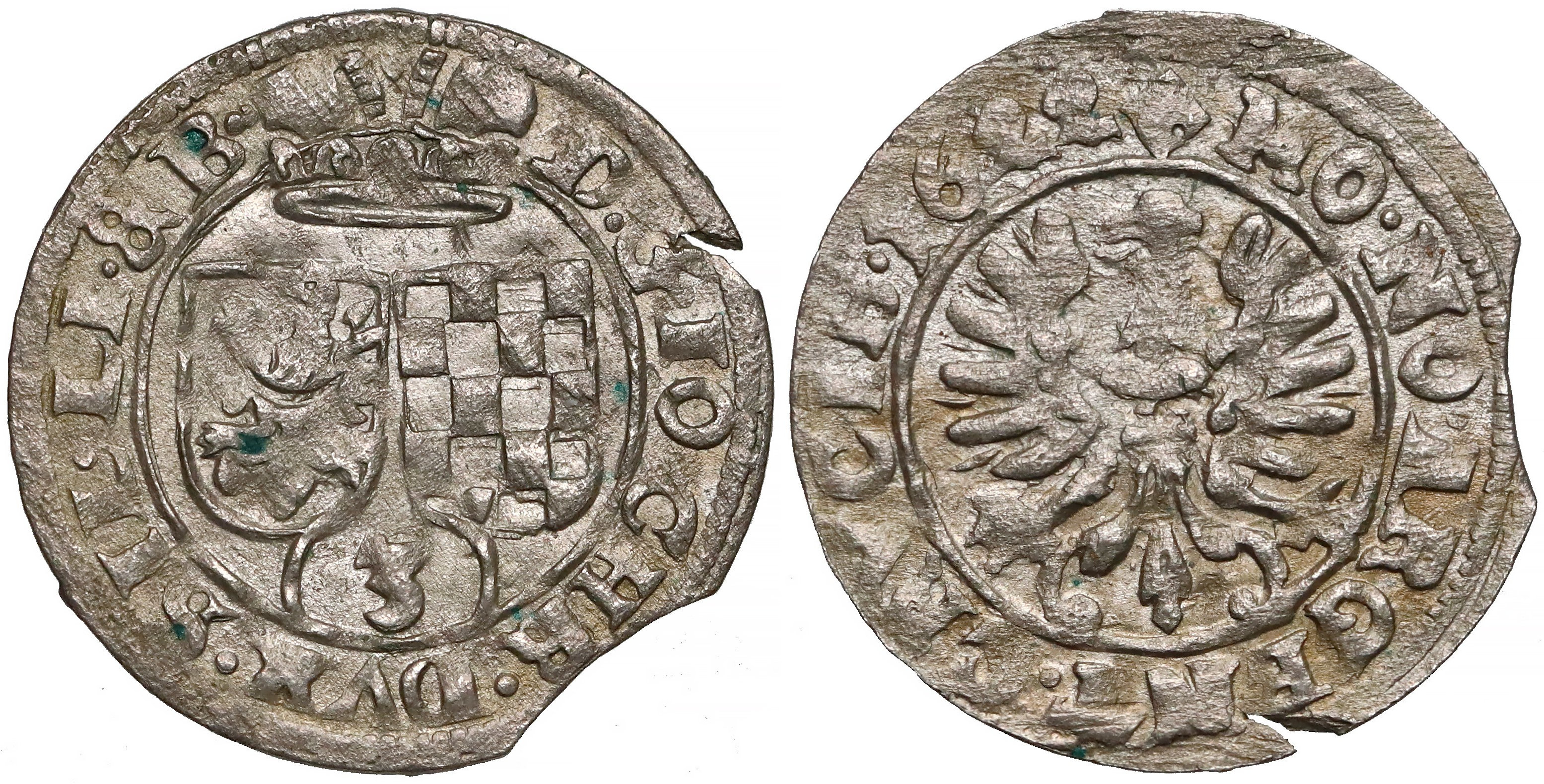
17th-century coin of the Duchy of Brzeg from the local mint

A mint operated in Kluczbork during the reign of Duke Bolesław III the Generous, in the early 14th century. In 1426 Duke Louis II of Brzeg granted Kluczbork privileges of a salt market. For centuries the town was inhabited by a predominantly Polish-speaking populace. The textile industry began to grow in importance in 1553, but suffered a fire in 1569. Another great fire destroyed many houses on 8 December 1562. On 25 January 1588, the day after the Battle of Byczyna, Polish troops under Jan Zamoyski plundered the city. The townspeople accepted the Protestant Reformation in 1656 and converted the local Roman Catholic Church into a Lutheran one. The Polish Brethren settled in the city after 1660, and organized their synods in the city in 1663 and 1668. The town had a population of approximately 1,000 in 1681.

A fire on 23 April 1737 almost completely destroyed the town, leaving only a few houses and the castle unscathed. Several years of rebuilding passed before it reached its previous size.

In the 18th century Kreuzburg was annexed by the Kingdom of Prussia in 1741 during the Silesian Wars and became part of the Prussian Province of Silesia. Under Prussian rule the town and the region saw a large influx of German-speaking settlers.

The town became part of the German Empire upon the unification of Germany in 1871. It had a predominantly German-speaking population of 5,238 in 1875, although it was located in a Polish-dominated district. The population grew to 8,750 by 1895 and 10,236 by 1900.

=== 20th century ===
Following the Treaty of Versailles after World War I, Kreuzburg was involved in the Upper Silesian referendum in 1921. 95.6% (37,957 votes out of 39,703 participants) voted to remain within Weimar Germany instead of joining the Second Polish Republic. It became part of the Province of Upper Silesia; to differentiate between other places named Kreuzburg, it was known as Kreuzburg O.S. (referring to Oberschlesien, or Upper Silesia). By 1939 the town was the seat of Landkreis Kreuzburg O.S. and had 11,693 inhabitants. After the Nazi Party took power in Germany in the 1930s, anti-Polish and anti-Jewish sentiments became more visible. In 1936, the Germans changed the Polish-sounding street names, and in 1938, during the Kristallnacht they burned down the synagogue, built in 1886. Local Polish leader Paweł Widera was arrested in May 1939.

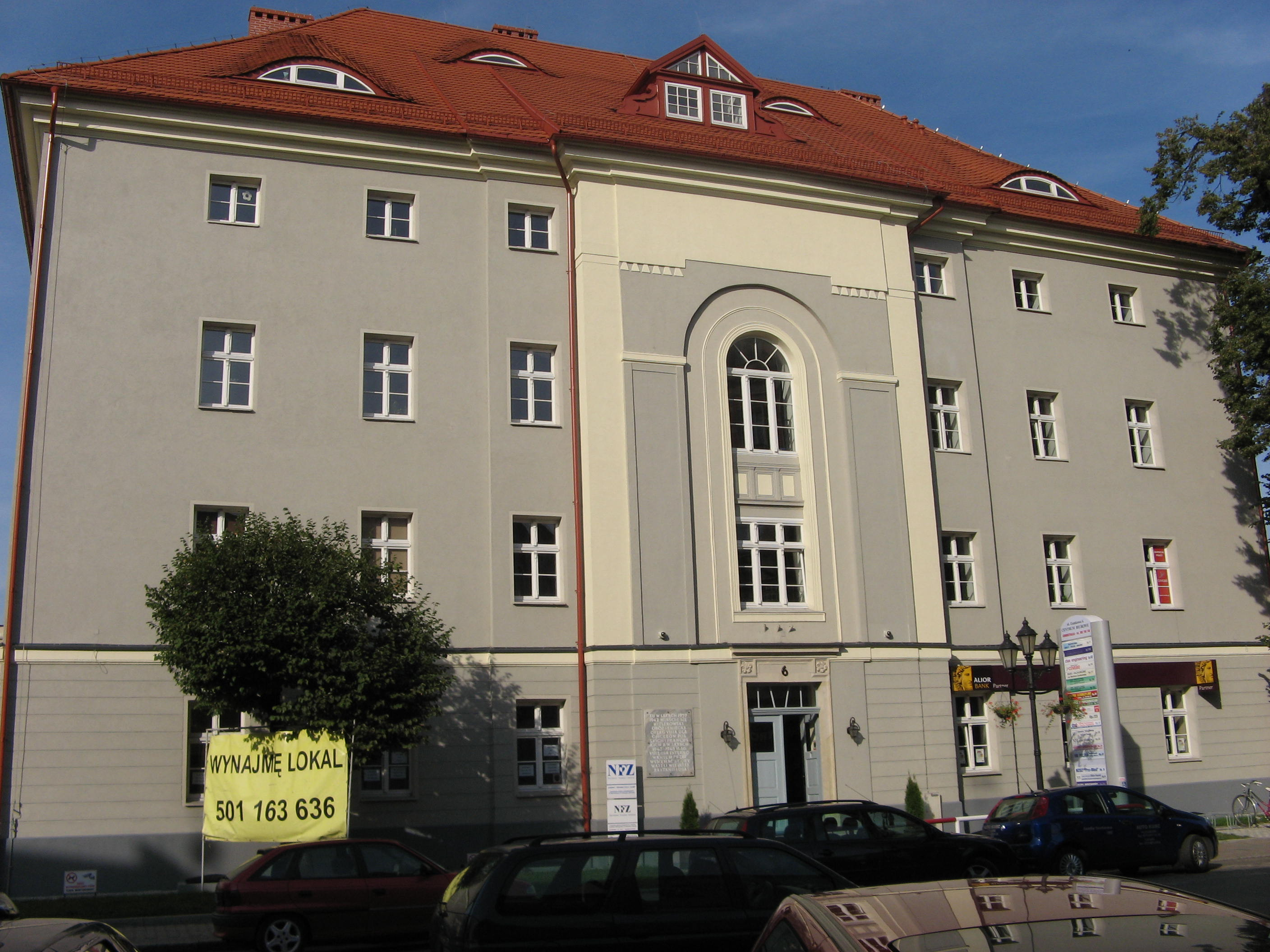
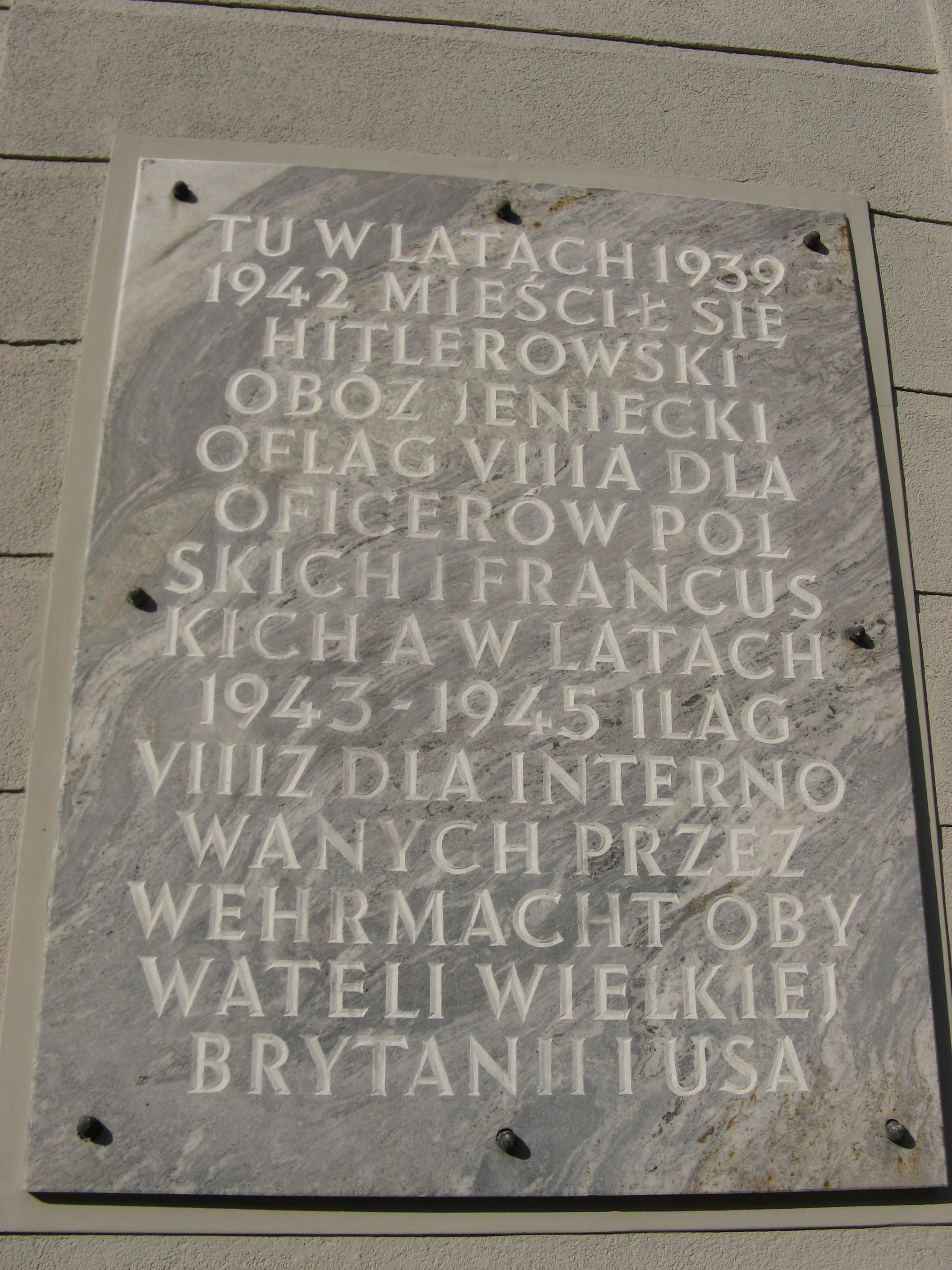
Former German Oflag VIII A POW camp and Ilag VIII/Z camp with a memorial plaque

During World War II, in 1939, the Germans established the Oflag VIII-A prisoner-of-war camp, initially for Polish officers and later also for French prisoners of war. In 1942, the camp was dissolved and the prisoners were transferred to Oflag VIII-F in Moravská Třebová in German-occupied Czechoslovakia. In 1943, the Germans founded the Ilag VIII/Z camp for interned citizens of the United Kingdom and the United States.

In January 1945, as the Soviet forces advanced, the German authorities evacuated the civilian population toward the western parts of occupied Bohemia. That same month, sick prisoners of war from Stalag Luft 7 were moved to Ilag VIII/Z, while the remaining POWs were forced to march westward in harsh winter conditions during the so-called death march.

The town was captured by the Red Army on 20 January 1945. Following Germany’s defeat, Kluczbork was restored to Poland. In July 1945, the new Polish administration issued a decree requiring the remaining Germans to wear clothing marked with the letter “N” on a white background. Soon afterward, the remaining German population was expelled.

Between 1975 and 1998, the town was part of the former Opole Voivodeship. A monument to Jan Dzierżon, a pioneering and internationally renowned Polish apiarist, was unveiled in 1981.

== Economy ==
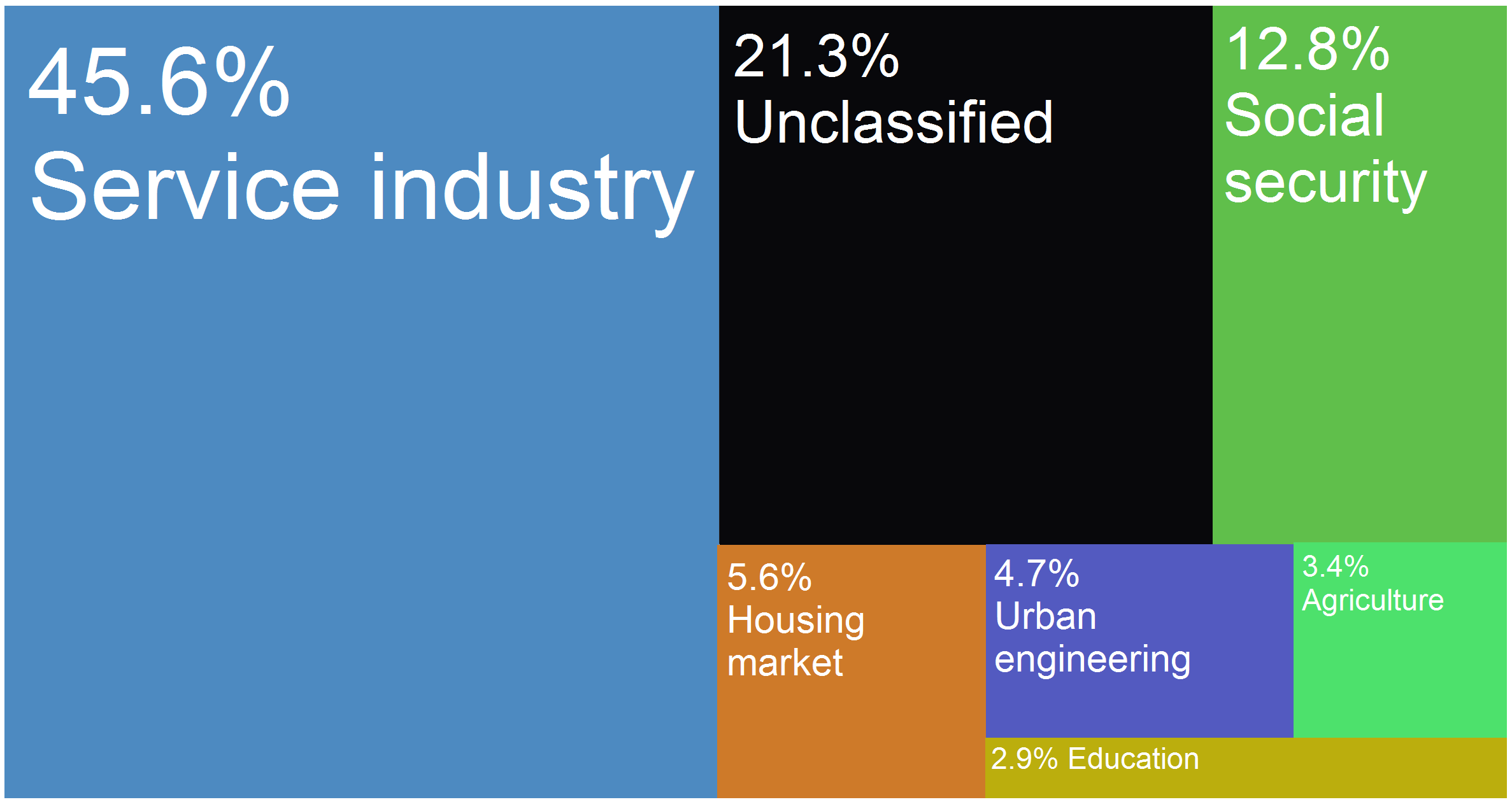
Kluczbork budget income's sources as of 2015.

Kluczbork's economy is dominated by the production of machinery, knitwear and construction material, alongside newly emerging industries, namely: the transport sector, trade, agriculture and the food production sector as well as being the centre for the Kluczbork County's banks and other financial institutions. The Gmina Kluczbork has some 1800 businesses (1300 of which are located within the city's boundaries). The largest factories in Kluczbork are: Fabryka Maszyn i Urządzeń „Famak” (machinery production), PV „Prefabet - Kluczbork” S.A. (concrete materials) and Wagrem sp. z o.o. Kluczbork (weighing scale repairs).

The part of the town of Kluczbork, around Ligota Dolna, is part of the Wałbrzych Special Economic Zone (area of 53939 ha). The current investors in the Wałbrzych Special Economic Zone are: Marcegaglia Poland, Inpol-Krak Tubes Service Center and the German Seppeler Gruppe Ocynkownia Śląsk (galvanisation company).

== Sport ==
MKS Kluczbork is a professional association football club founded in 2003 as a result of a merger of two local clubs.

== Notable people ==
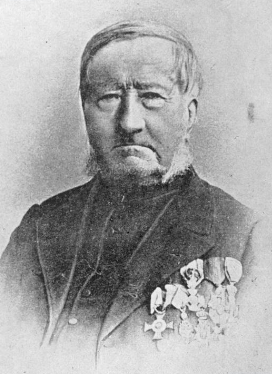
Jan Dzierżon, Polish apiarist and "father of modern apiculture", was born in Łowkowice, Kluczbork County

- Adam Gdacjusz (1615–1688), parish priest in this city
- Samuel Crellius (1660–1747), philosopher and theologian
- Jan Dzierżon (1811–1906), apiarist
- Gustav Freytag (1816–1895), dramatist and novelist
- Walther von Lüttwitz (1859, Bogacica, near this city – 1942)
- Kurt Daluege (1897–1946), Nazi SS police chief executed for war crimes
- Heinz Piontek (1925–2003), author
- Edyta Górniak (born 1972), singer
- Tomasz Garbowski (born 1979), politician
- Wojciech Zaremba (born 1988), computer scientist, businessman; co-founder of OpenAI

== Twin towns – sister cities ==
See twin towns of Gmina Kluczbork.

== Gallery ==
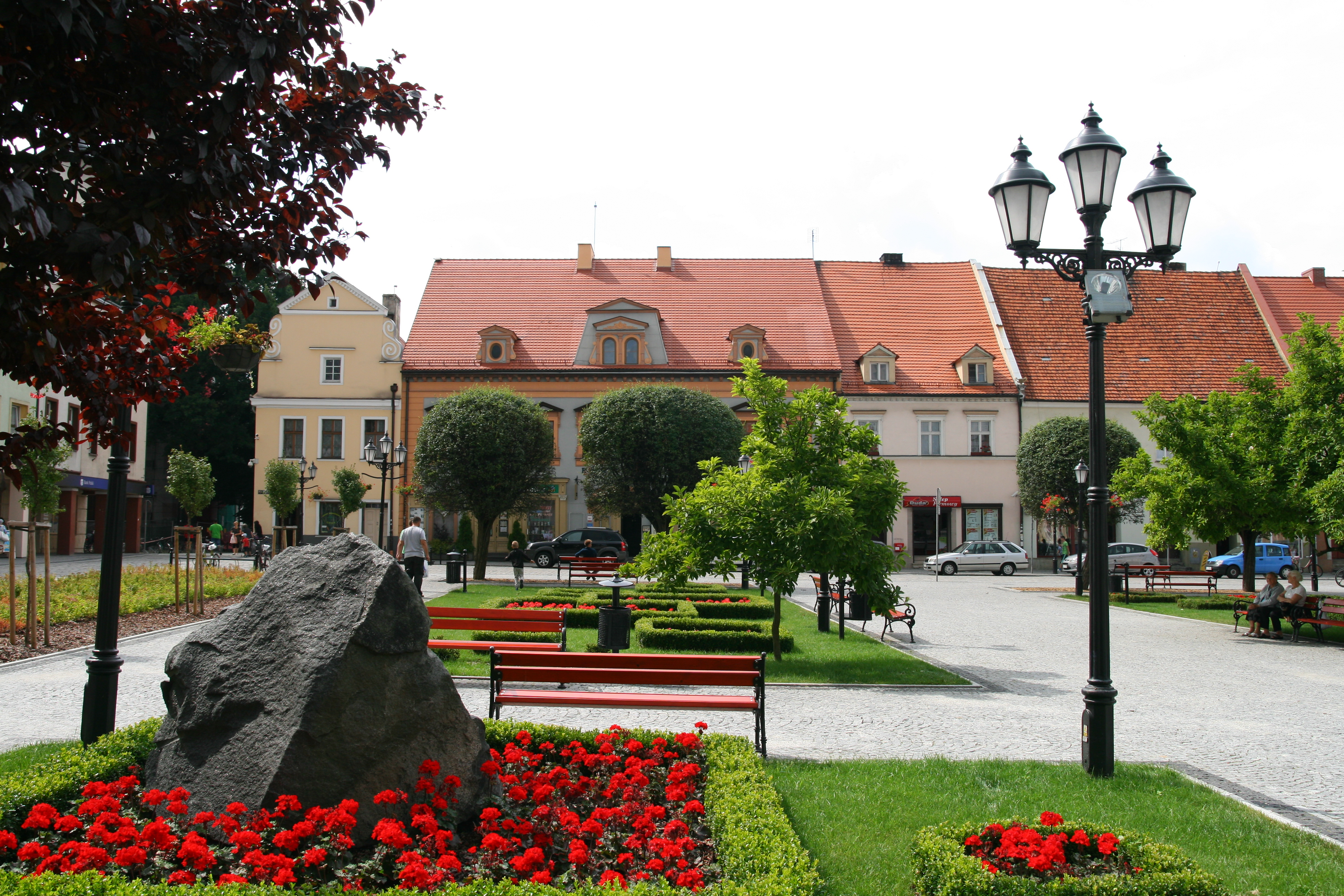
Market Square (Rynek)

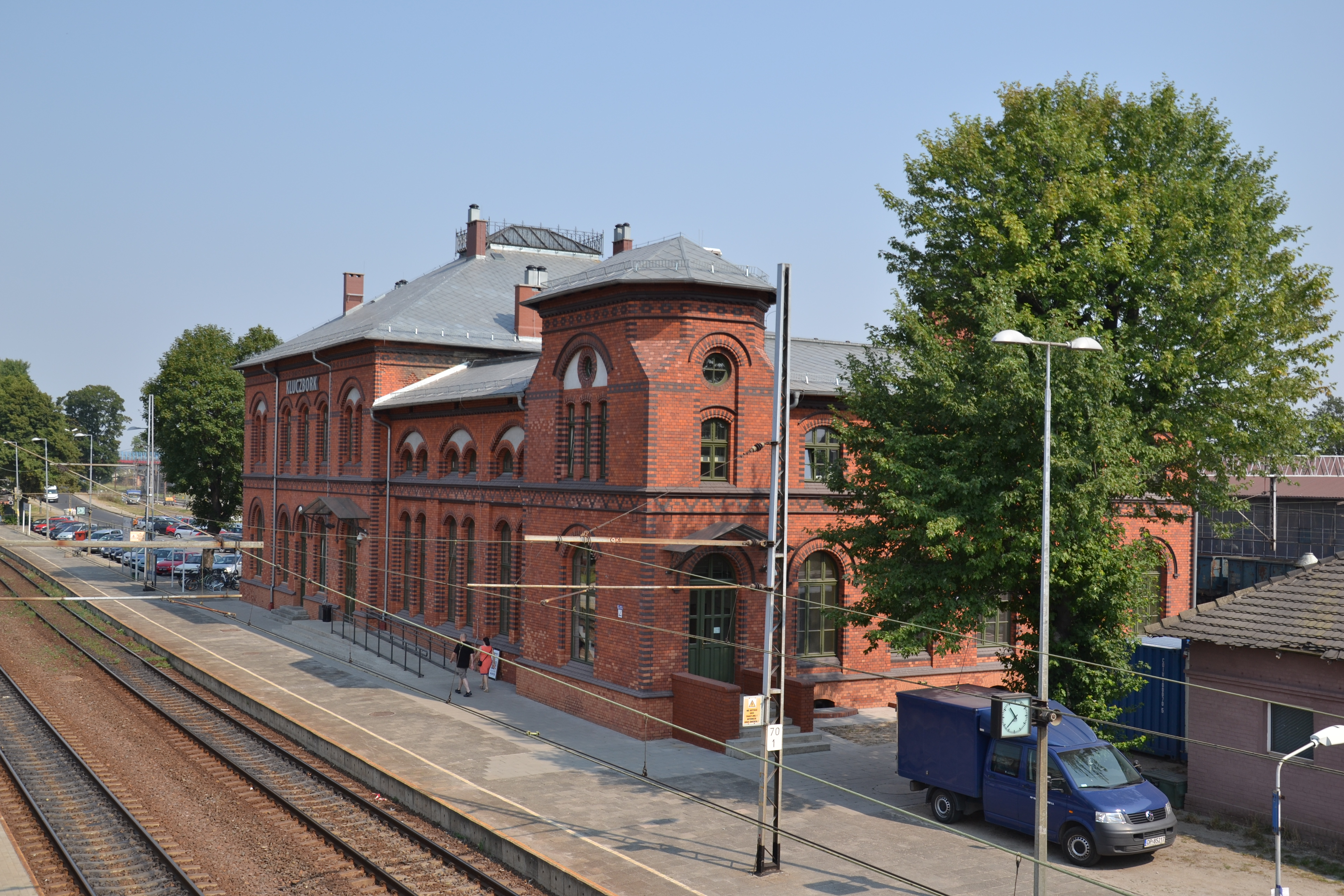
Railway station

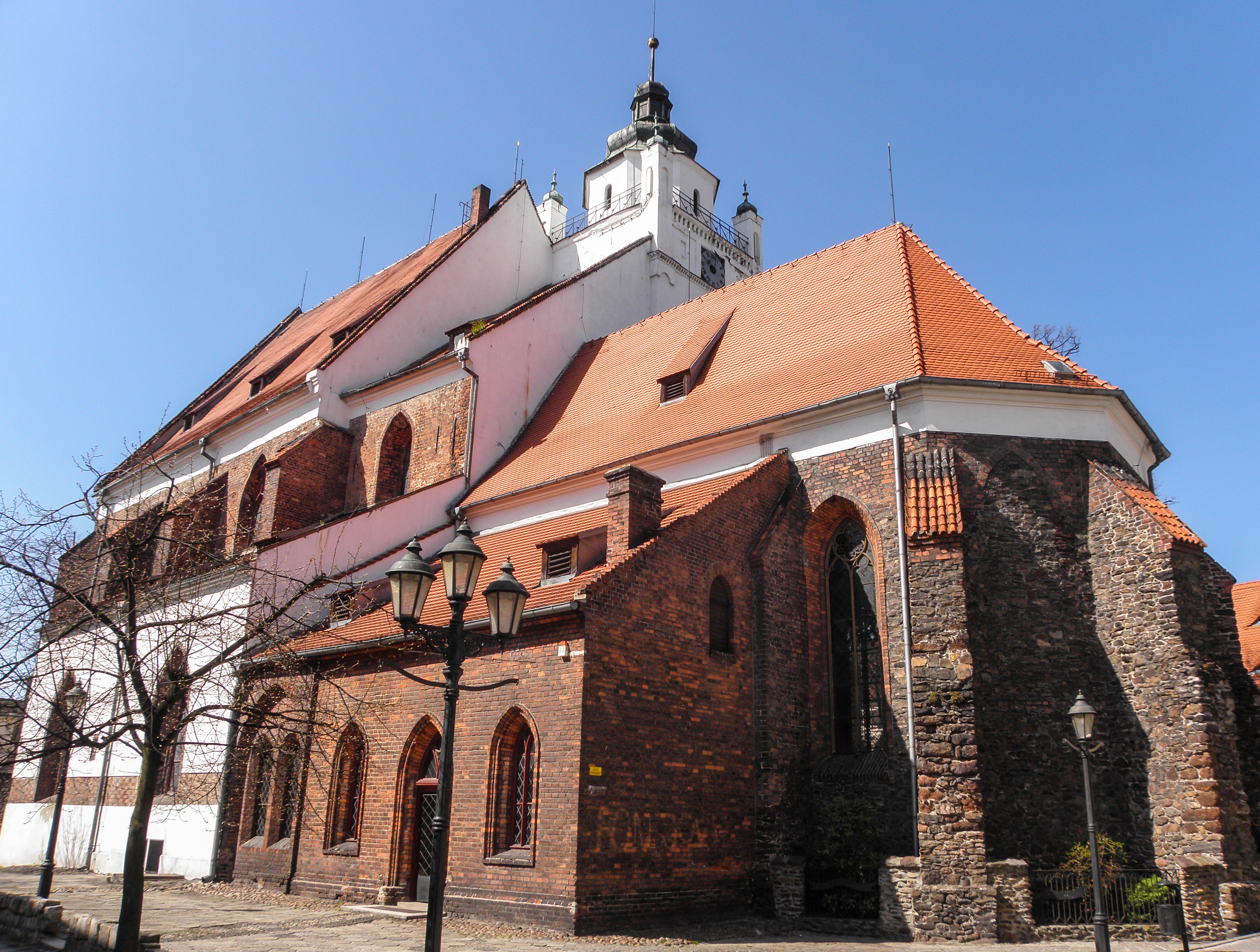
Church of Christ Saviour

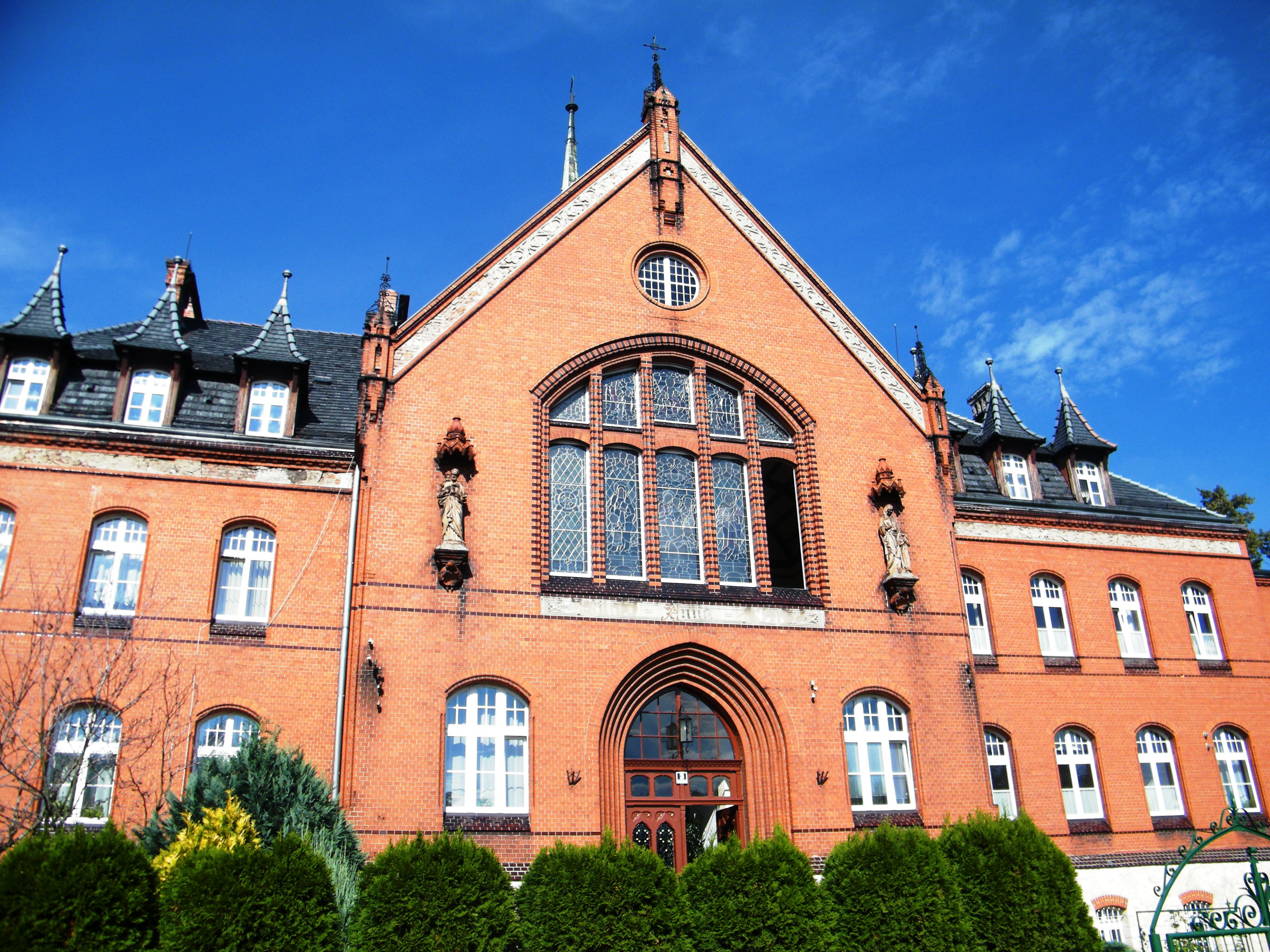
Monastery of the Sisters of Saint Elizabeth

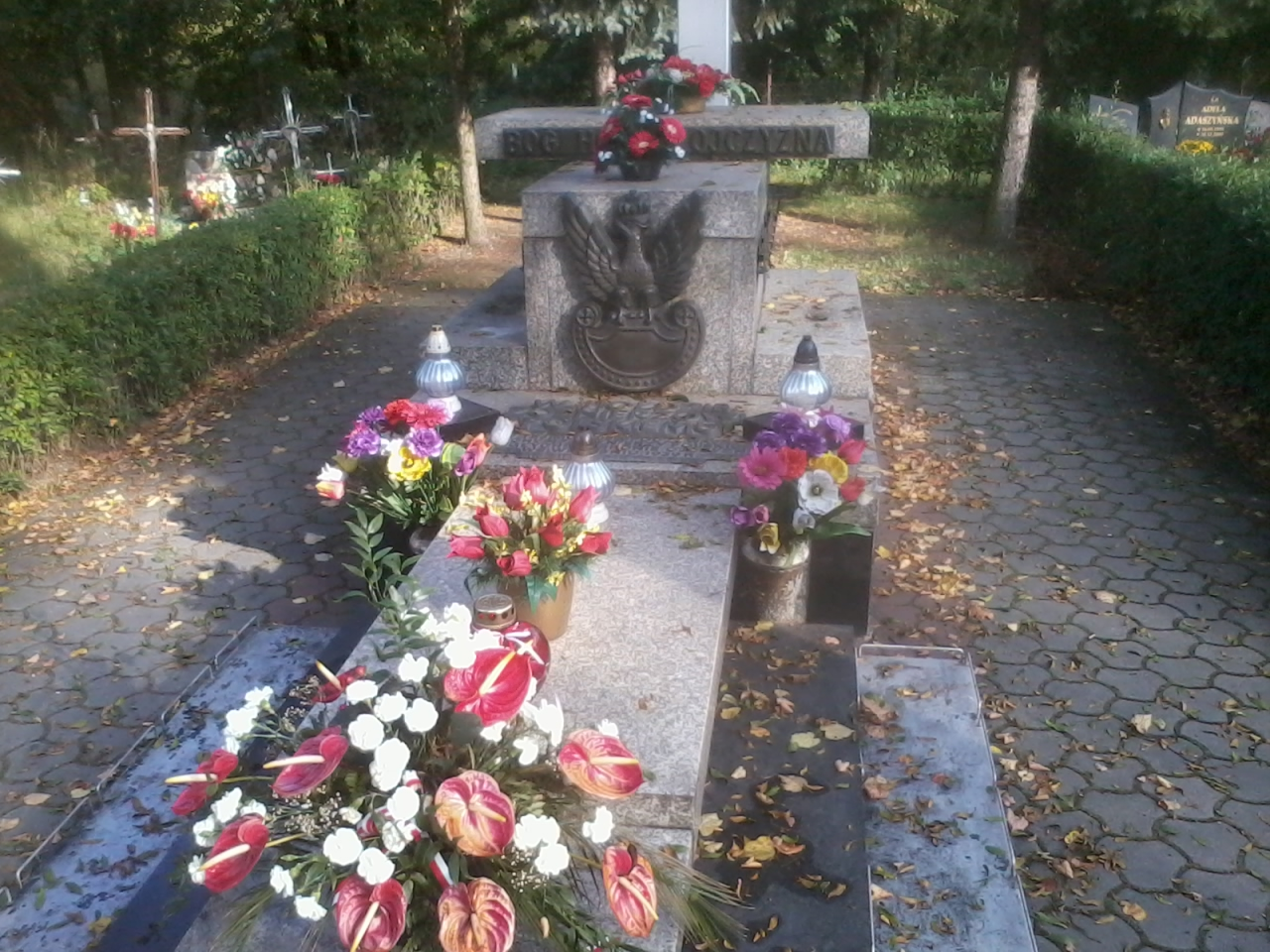
The grave of Polish soldiers killed in World War II in 1939
