= Borkowice =

Borkowice may refer to the following places in Poland:

- Borkowice, Lower Silesian Voivodeship (south-west Poland)
- Borkowice, Masovian Voivodeship (east-central Poland)
- Borkowice, Greater Poland Voivodeship (west-central Poland)
- Borkowice, Brzeg County in Opole Voivodeship (south-west Poland)
- Borkowice, Kluczbork County in Opole Voivodeship (south-west Poland)
- Borkowice, West Pomeranian Voivodeship (north-west Poland)
