= Bogdańczowice =

- Village
- Location within Poland
- Coordinates: 50°58′47″N 18°16′56″E
- Country: Poland
- Voivodeship: Opole
- County: Kluczbork
- Gmina: Kluczbork

Bogdańczowice [bɔɡdaɲt͡ʂɔˈvit͡sɛ] is a village in the administrative district of Gmina Kluczbork, within Kluczbork County, Opole Voivodeship, in south-western Poland.
