= Bogacka Szklarnia =

- Village
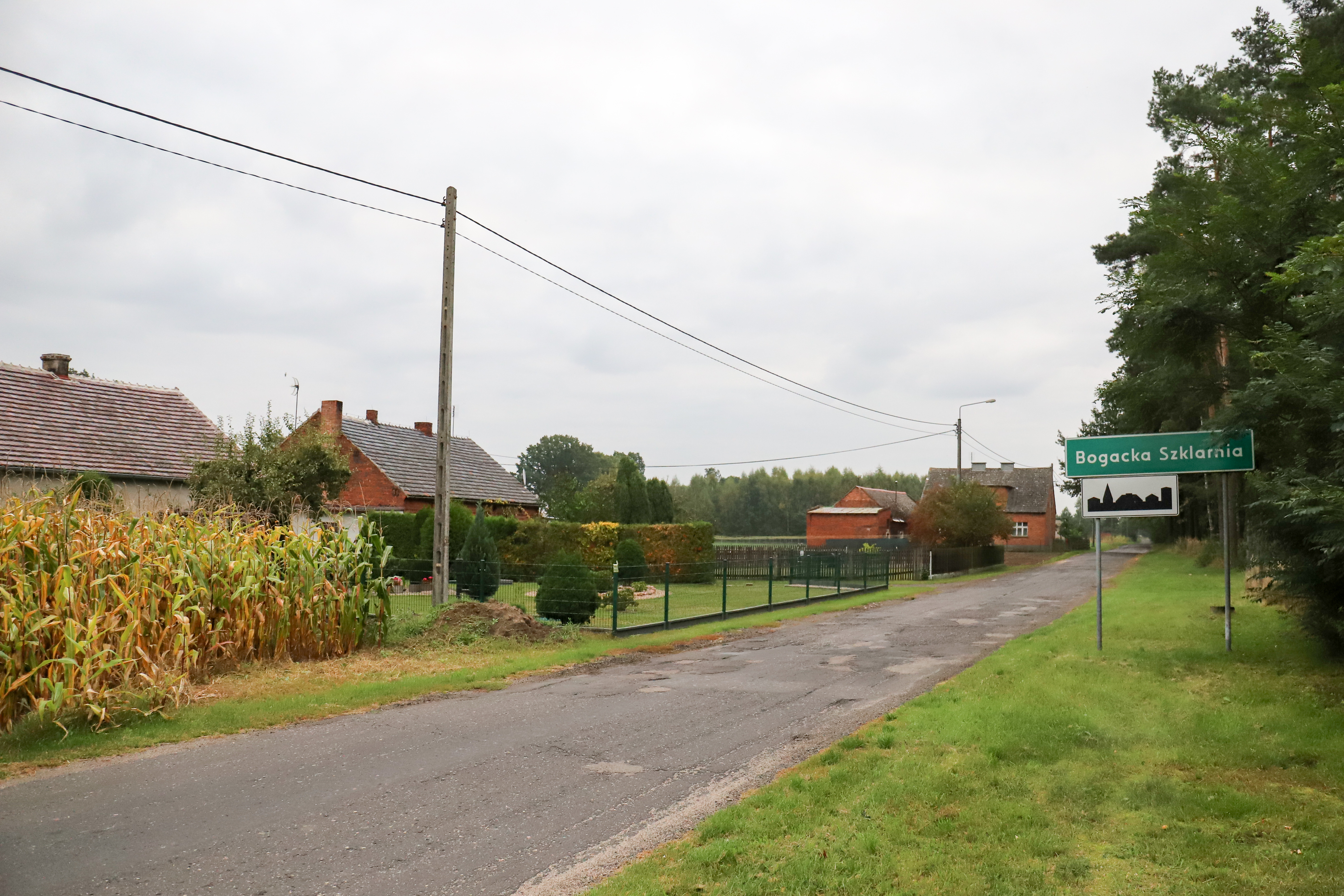

- Location within Poland
- Coordinates: 50°57′40″N 18°5′58″E
- Country: Poland
- Voivodeship: Opole
- County: Kluczbork
- Gmina: Kluczbork

Bogacka Szklarnia [bɔˈɡat͡ska ˈʂklarɲa] is a village in the administrative district of Gmina Kluczbork, within Kluczbork County, Opole Voivodeship, in south-western Poland. From the Prussian-led unification of Germany in 1871 until the end of WWII, it was known as Glashütte in the administrative district of Upper Silesia (German: Oberschlesien) in Eastern Prussia, and settled predominantly by ethnic Slavs, Evangelical Protestants, and Silesian German farmers. No other evidence of Protestant evangelical influence remains, except for the abandoned schoolhouse which still stands behind an overgrown copse of trees (Google maps 2018: 50°57'36.1"N 18°06'37.8"E).
