= Unieszów =

- Village
- Location within Poland
- Coordinates: 51°1′N 18°8′E
- Country: Poland
- Voivodeship: Opole
- County: Kluczbork
- Gmina: Kluczbork
- Time zone: UTC+1 (CET)
  - Summer (DST): UTC+2 (CEST)
- Vehicle registration: OKL

Unieszów [uˈɲɛʂuf] is a village in the administrative district of Gmina Kluczbork, in Kluczbork County], Opole Voivodeship, in southern Poland.
