= Czaple Wolne =

- Village
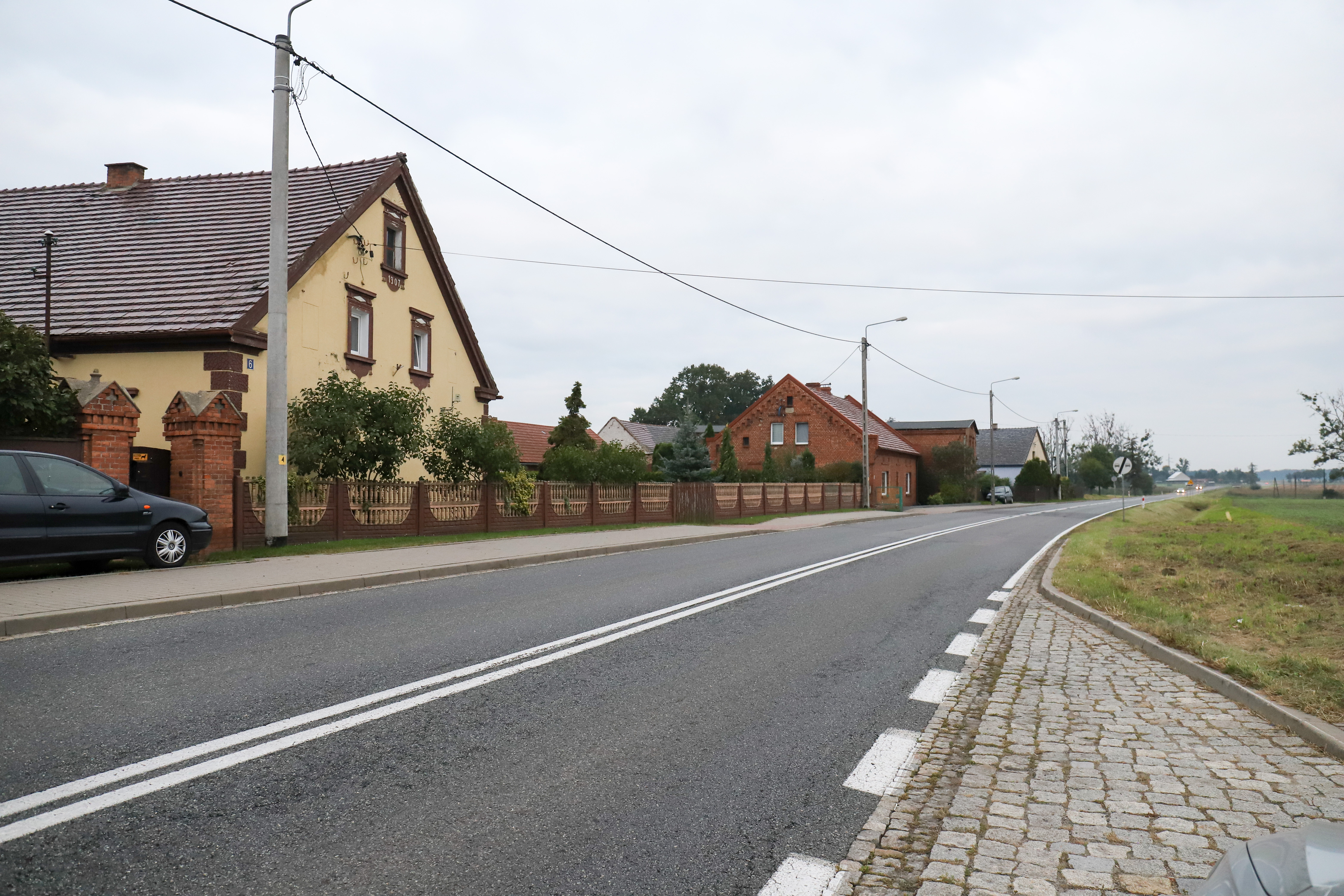

- Location within Poland
- Coordinates: 50°58′46″N 18°08′52″E
- Country: Poland
- Voivodeship: Opole
- County: Kluczbork
- Gmina: Kluczbork
- Time zone: UTC+1 (CET)
  - Summer (DST): UTC+2 (CEST)
- Vehicle registration: OKL

Czaple Wolne [ˈt͡ʂaplɛ ˈvɔlnɛ] is a village in the administrative district of Gmina Kluczbork, within Kluczbork County, Opole Voivodeship, in southern Poland.
