= Smardy Górne =

- Village
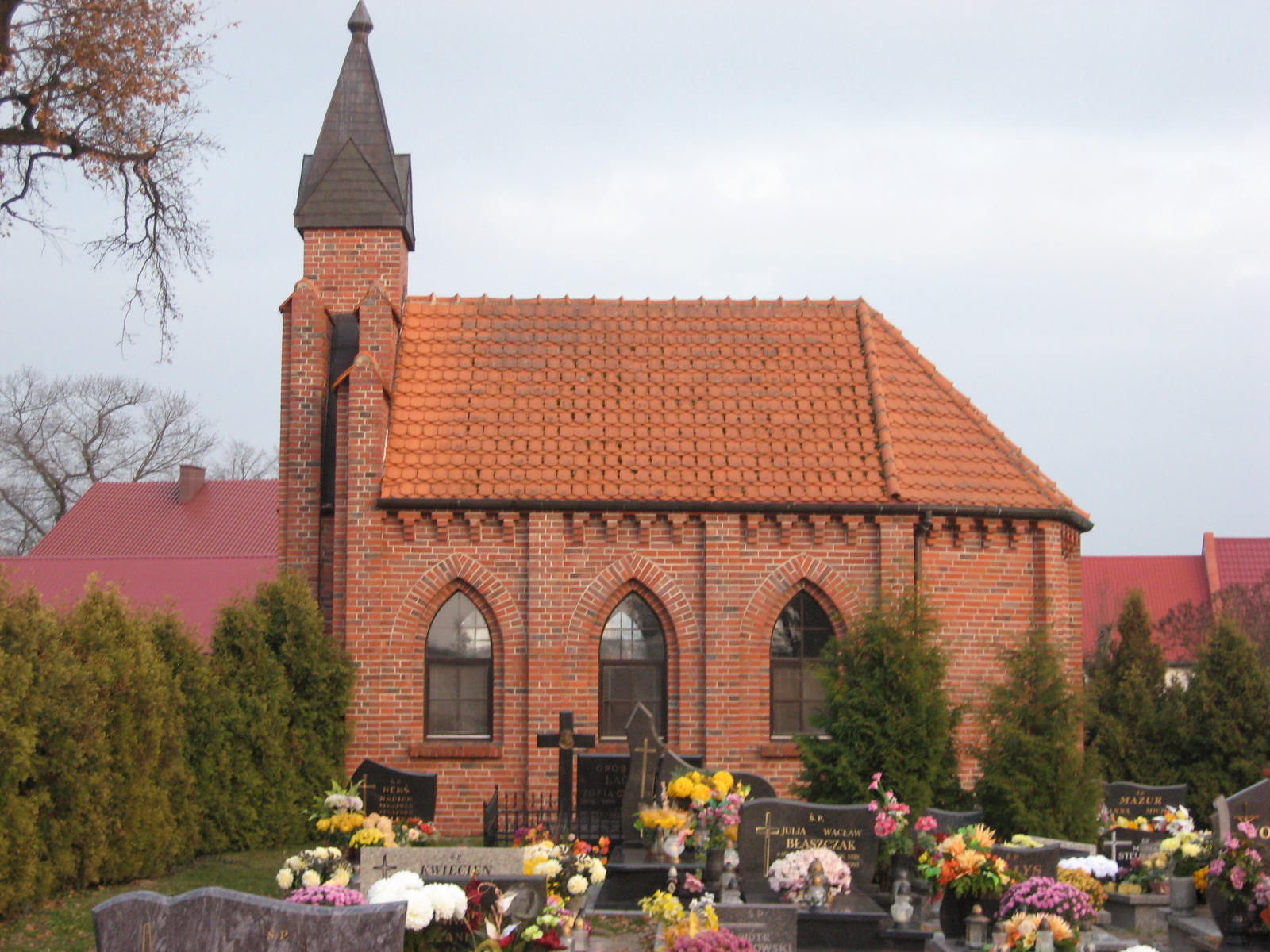
- Exaltation of the Holy Cross Church in Smardy Górne

- Location within Poland
- Coordinates: 51°0′N 18°10′E
- Country: Poland
- Voivodeship: Opole
- County: Kluczbork
- Gmina: Kluczbork
- Time zone: UTC+1 (CET)
  - Summer (DST): UTC+2 (CEST)
- Vehicle registration: OKL

Smardy Górne [ˈsmardɨ ˈɡurnɛ] is a village in the administrative district of Gmina Kluczbork, within Kluczbork County, Opole Voivodeship, in southern Poland.
