= Krasków =

Krasków may refer to the following places in Poland:

- Krasków, Lower Silesian Voivodeship (south-west Poland)
- Krasków, Opole Voivodeship (south-west Poland)
