= Bażany =

- Village
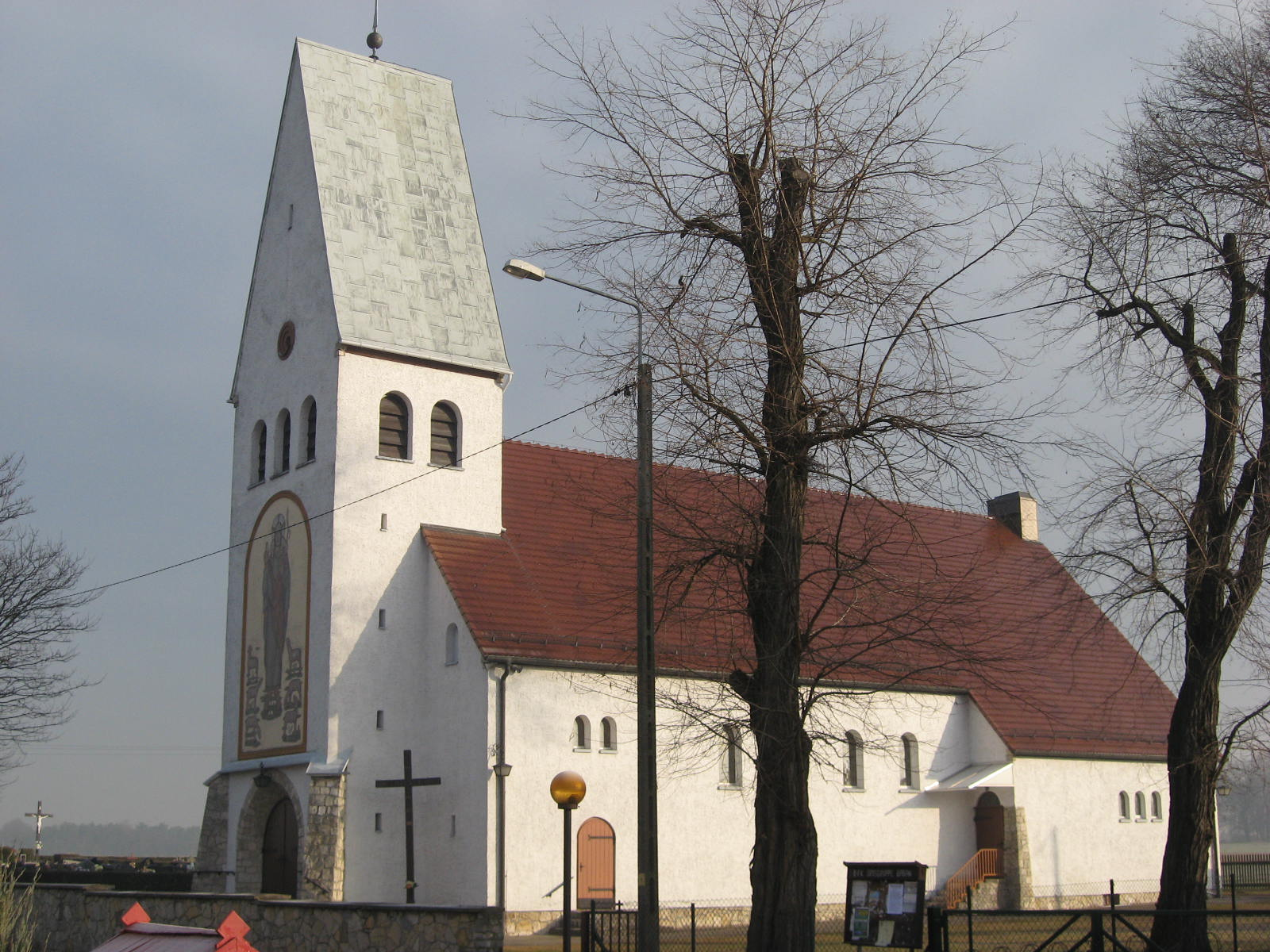
- Christ the King church in Bażany

- Location within Poland
- Coordinates: 50°51′N 18°11′E
- Country: Poland
- Voivodeship: Opole
- County: Kluczbork
- Gmina: Kluczbork
- Time zone: UTC+1 (CET)
  - Summer (DST): UTC+2 (CEST)
- Vehicle registration: OKL

Bażany [baˈʐanɨ] is a village in the administrative district of Gmina Kluczbork, within Kluczbork County, Opole Voivodeship, south-western Poland.

The name of the village is of Polish origin and comes from the word bażant, which means "pheasant".
