= Moritz Cohn =

Prussian-born playwright, poet, and novelist

- Born: 8 January 1844; Kreuzburg, Silesia, Kingdom of Prussia
- Died: after 1907
- Writing career
- Pen name: Conimor
- Language: German

Moritz Cohn (8 January 1844 – after 1907), also known by the pseudonym Conimor, was a Prussian-born playwright, poet, and novelist, as well as a prolific contributor to the press.

Cohn was born into a Jewish family in Kreuzburg, Silesia, and educated at the gymnasium of Brieg. He began life as a clerk in a merchant's office in Breslau, devoting his spare time to writing. He later worked at his brother's banking business in Görlitz, with whom he also participated in railroad construction.

After some of his plays had met with success, Cohn abandoned commerce and in 1875 settled down in Vienna as an author.

== Publications ==
- Der Improvisator (drama). 1874.
- Vor der Ehe. Original-Lustspiel in fünf Acten (drama). Alexander Eurich. 1876.
- Ein Ritt durch Wien auf dramitischem Felde Gedichtet von Conimor (satirical poem). Leipzig: Ernst Julius Günther. 1876.
- Eine Visitenkarte. Lustspiel in einem Aufzuge (drama). Leipzig: Ferber & Seydel. 1877.
- Der Goldene Reif. Original-Lustspiel in drei Akten (drama). Vienna: Jos. Ruziczka. 1878.
- In Eigener Falle (drama). 1881.
- Im Lichte der Wahrheit (drama). 1882.
- Lieder und Gedichte. Vienna: L. Rosner. 1884.
- Wie Gefällt Ihnen Meine Frau (novel). 1886.
- Der Beste Gegner (drama). 1892.
- Lust- und Schauspiele. Vienna & Leipzig: Eisenstein. 1905.
