= Biadacz, Kluczbork County =

Biadacz
- Village
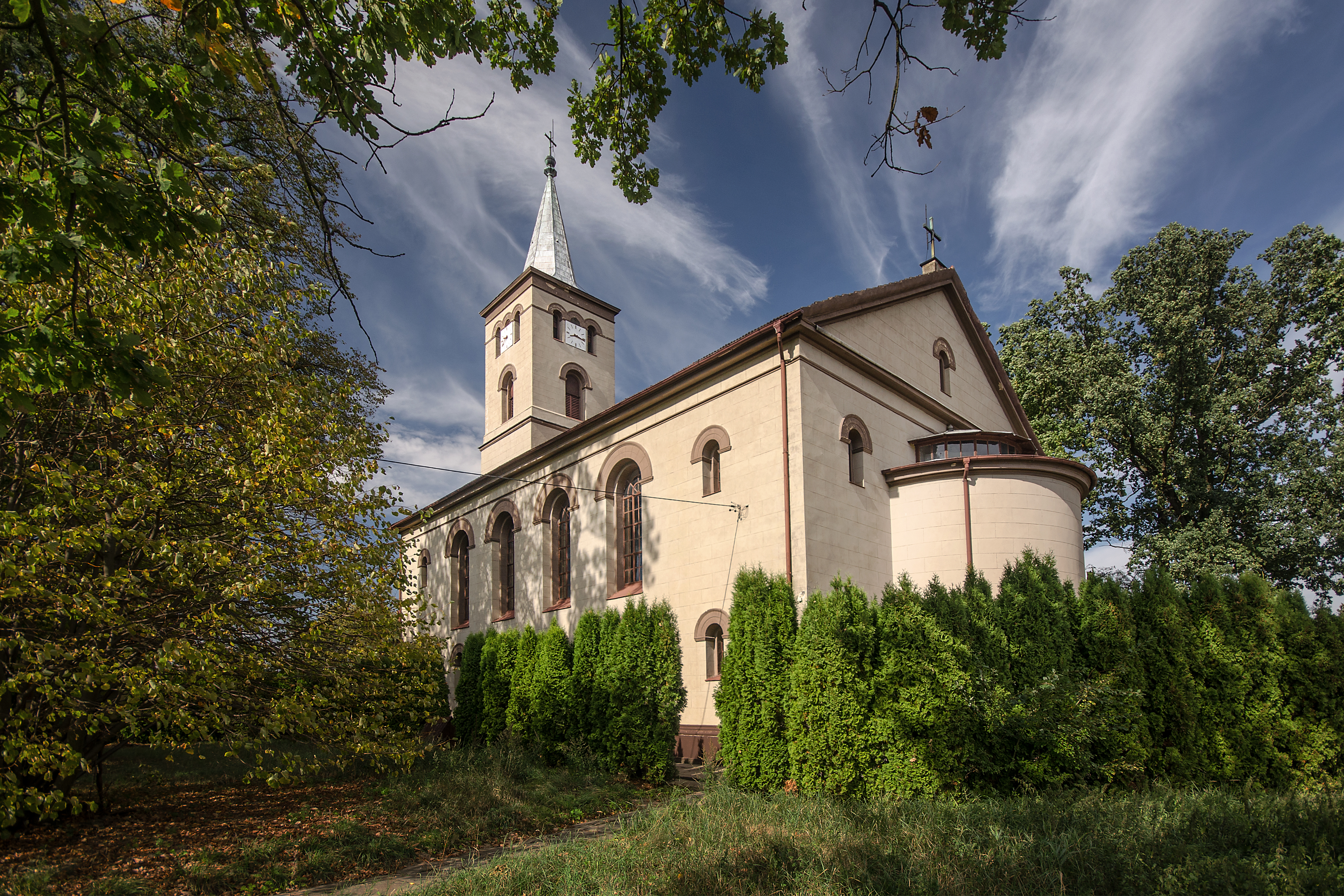
- Saint Joseph church in Biadacz

- Location within Poland
- Coordinates: 51°0′4″N 18°18′46″E
- Country: Poland
- Voivodeship: Opole
- Gmina: Kluczbork

Population (approx.)
  - Total: 1,000
- Time zone: UTC+1 (CET)
  - Summer (DST): UTC+2 (CEST)
- Vehicle registration: OKL

Biadacz [ˈbjadat͡ʂ] is a village in the administrative district of Gmina Kluczbork, within Kluczbork County, Opole Voivodeship, in southern Poland.
