= Nowa Bogacica =

- Village
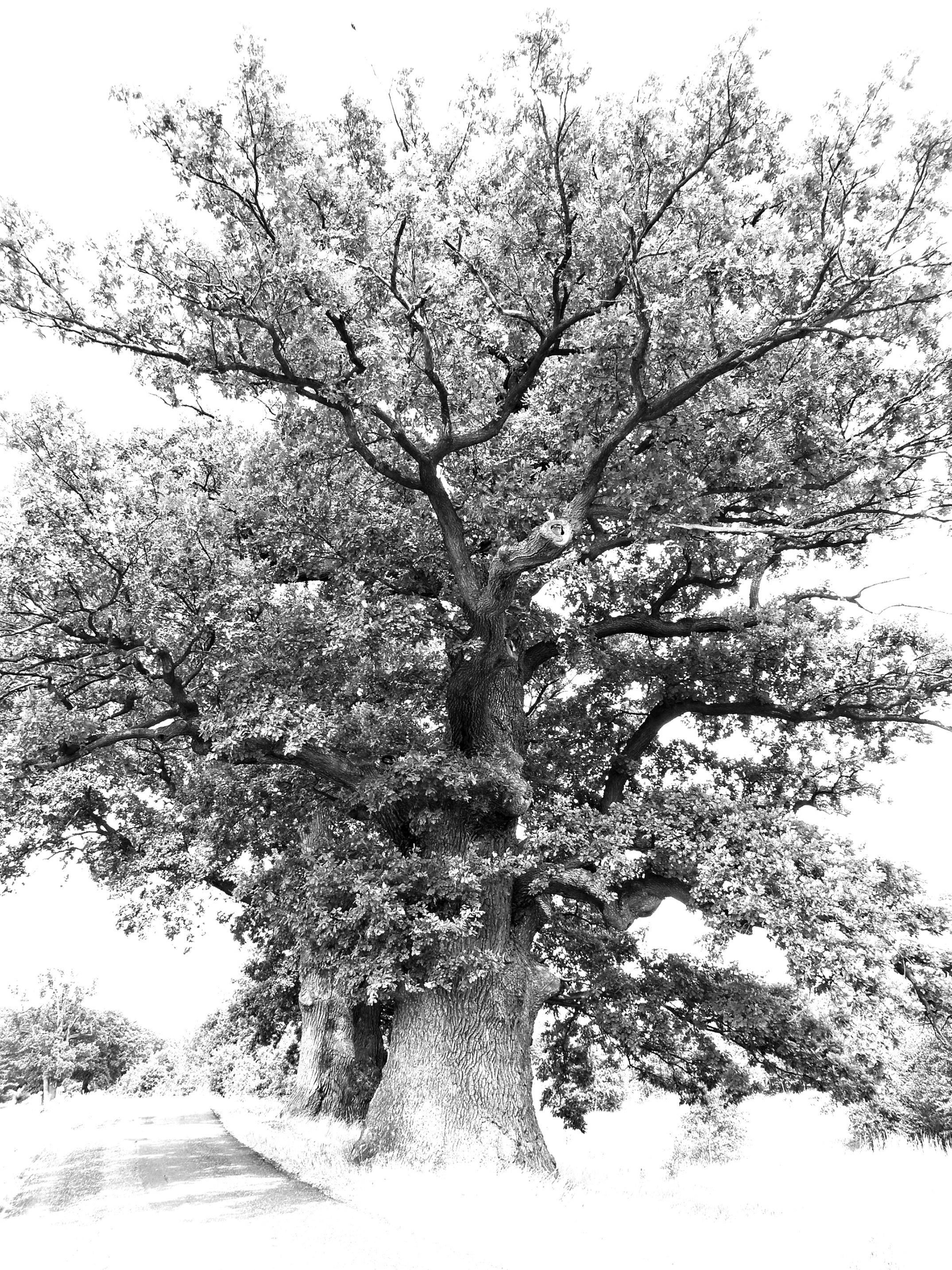
- Natural monument in Nowa Bogacica

- Location within Poland
- Coordinates: 50°54′45″N 18°05′48″E
- Country: Poland
- Voivodeship: Opole
- County: Kluczbork
- Gmina: Kluczbork
- Time zone: UTC+1 (CET)
  - Summer (DST): UTC+2 (CEST)
- Vehicle registration: OKL

Nowa Bogacica [ˈnɔva bɔɡaˈt͡ɕit͡sa] is a village in the administrative district of Gmina Kluczbork, within Kluczbork County, Opole Voivodeship, in southern Poland.
