= Żabiniec, Kluczbork County =

Żabiniec
- Village
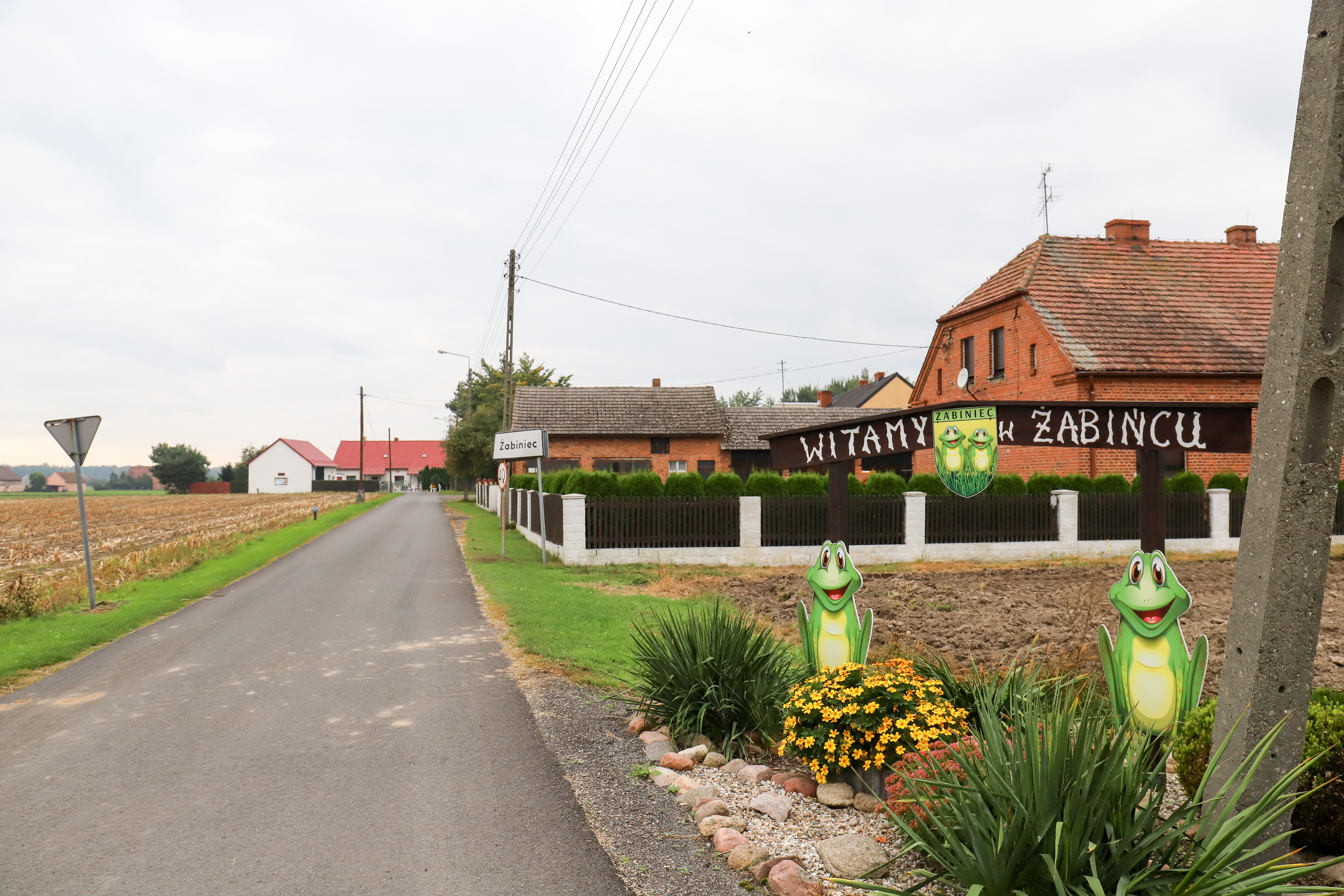

- Location within Poland
- Coordinates: 50°57′17″N 18°7′38″E
- Country: Poland
- Voivodeship: Opole
- County: Kluczbork
- Gmina: Kluczbork

Population
  - Total: 265
- Time zone: UTC+1 (CET)
  - Summer (DST): UTC+2 (CEST)
- Vehicle registration: OKL

Żabiniec [ʐaˈbiɲɛt͡s] is a village in the administrative district of Gmina Kluczbork, within Kluczbork County, Opole Voivodeship, in southern Poland.
