= Smardy Dolne =

- Village
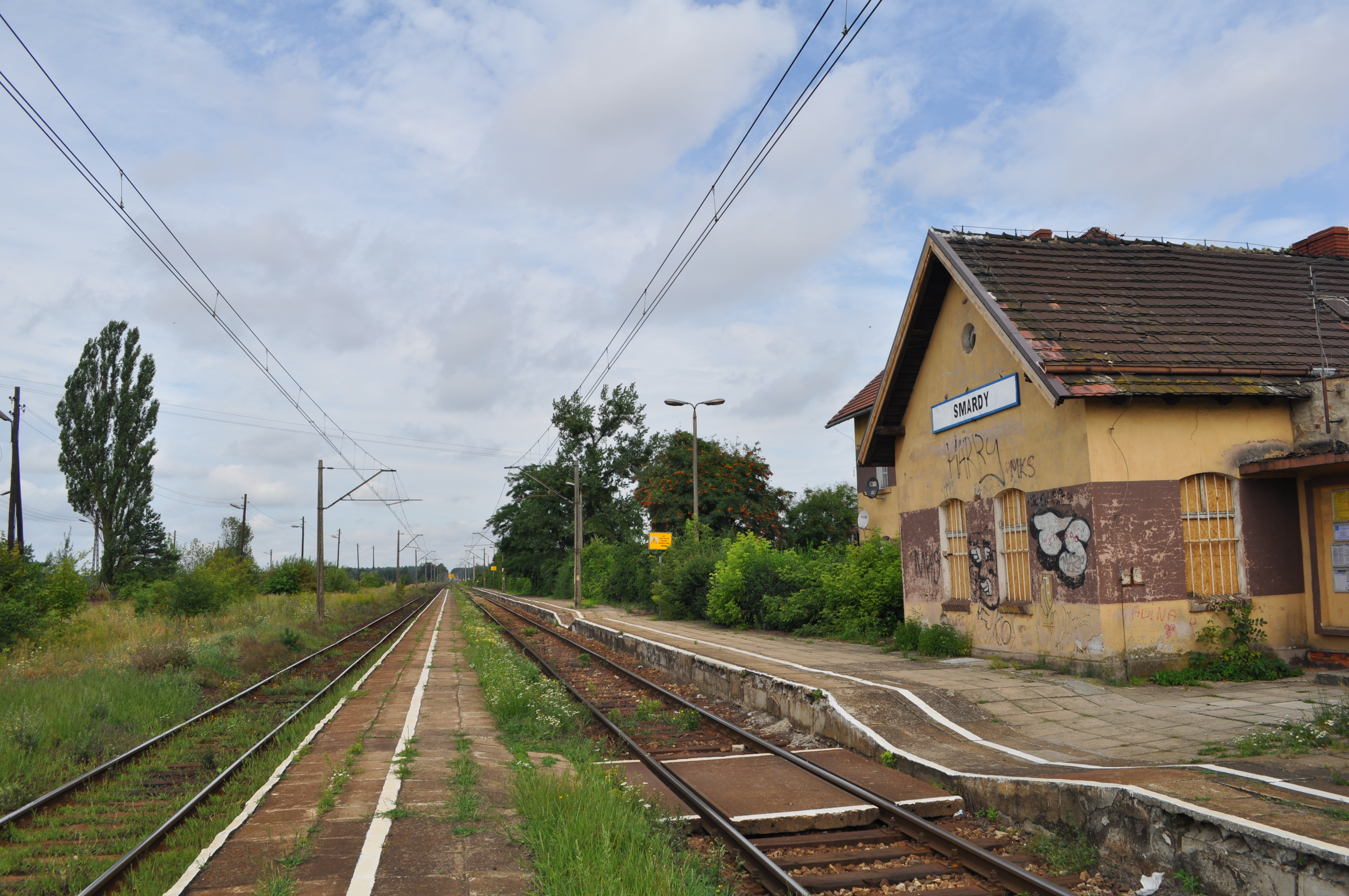
- Railway station

- Location within Poland
- Coordinates: 50°59′39″N 18°09′06″E
- Country: Poland
- Voivodeship: Opole
- County: Kluczbork
- Gmina: Kluczbork
- Time zone: UTC+1 (CET)
  - Summer (DST): UTC+2 (CEST)
- Vehicle registration: OKL

Smardy Dolne [ˈsmardɨ ˈdɔlnɛ] is a village in the administrative district of Gmina Kluczbork, within Kluczbork County, Opole Voivodeship, in southern Poland.
