= Bogacica =

- Village
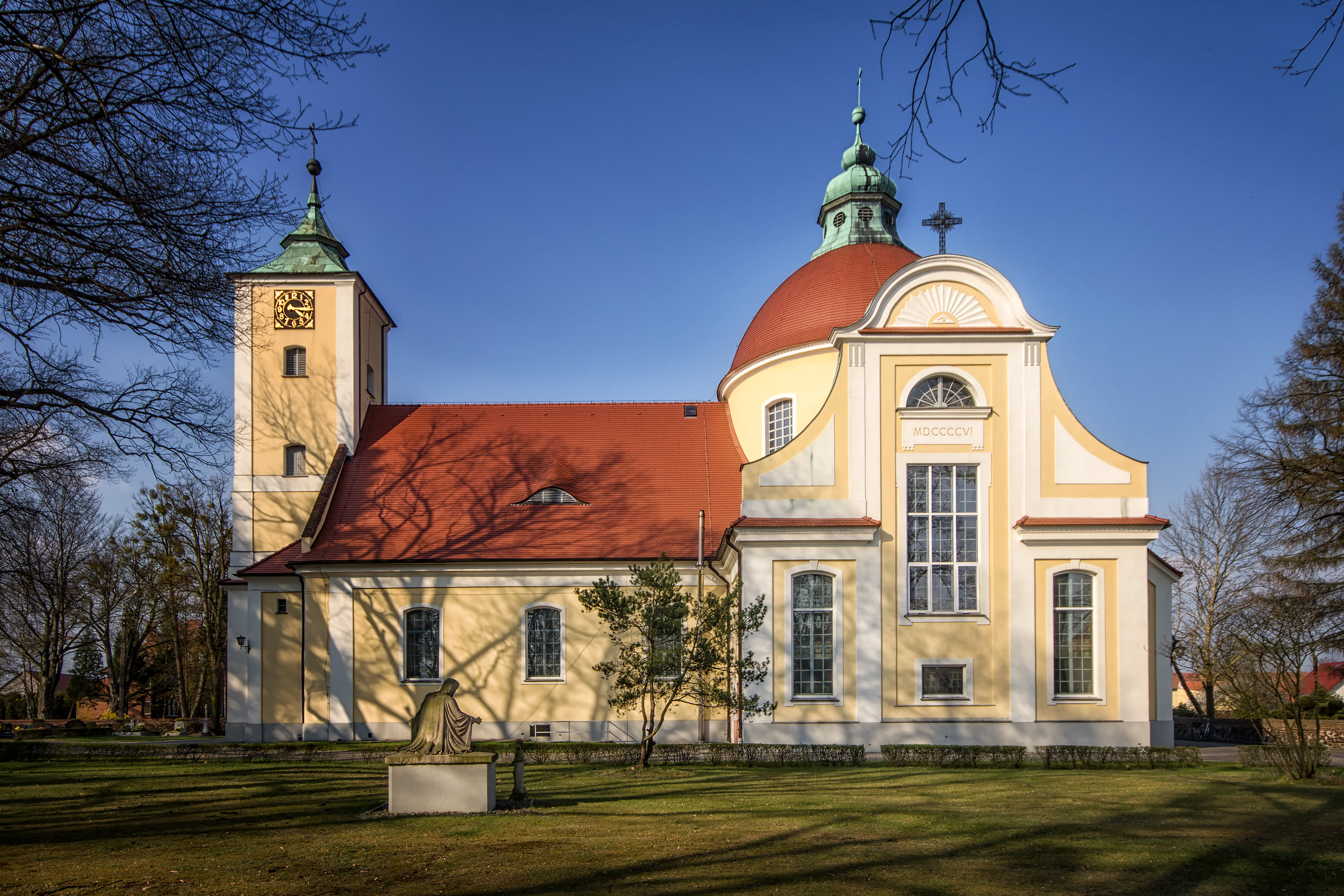
- Holy Trinity Church in Bogacica

- Location within Poland
- Coordinates: 50°58′14″N 18°8′12″E
- Country: Poland
- Voivodeship: Opole
- County: Kluczbork
- Gmina: Kluczbork

Population
  - Total: 1,520
- Time zone: UTC+1 (CET)
  - Summer (DST): UTC+2 (CEST)
- Vehicle registration: OKL

Bogacica [bɔɡaˈt͡ɕit͡sa] is a village in the administrative district of Gmina Kluczbork, within Kluczbork County, Opole Voivodeship, in southern Poland.

== Notable residents ==
- Walther von Lüttwitz (1859–1942), German general
