= Kujakowice Górne =

- Village
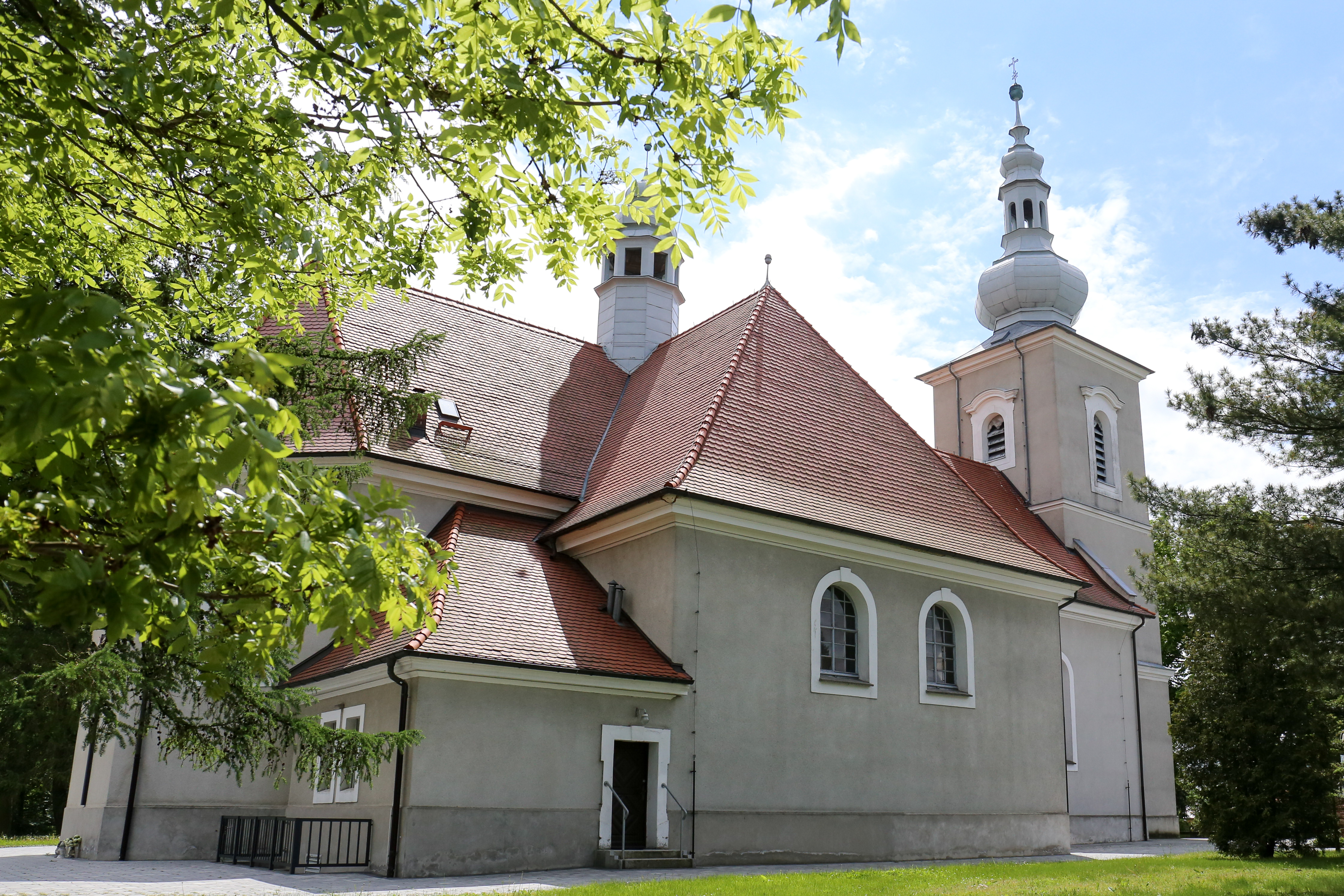
- Saint Stanislaus church in Kujakowice Górne

- Location within Poland
- Coordinates: 51°0′10″N 18°16′3″E
- Country: Poland
- Voivodeship: Opole
- County: Kluczbork
- Gmina: Kluczbork
- Time zone: UTC+1 (CET)
  - Summer (DST): UTC+2 (CEST)
- Vehicle registration: OKL
- Website: http://www.kujakowice.pl

Kujakowice Górne [kujakɔˈvit͡sɛ ˈɡurnɛ] is a village in the administrative district of Gmina Kluczbork, within Kluczbork County, Opole Voivodeship, in southern Poland.
