= Ligota Dolna, Kluczbork County =

Ligota Dolna
- Village
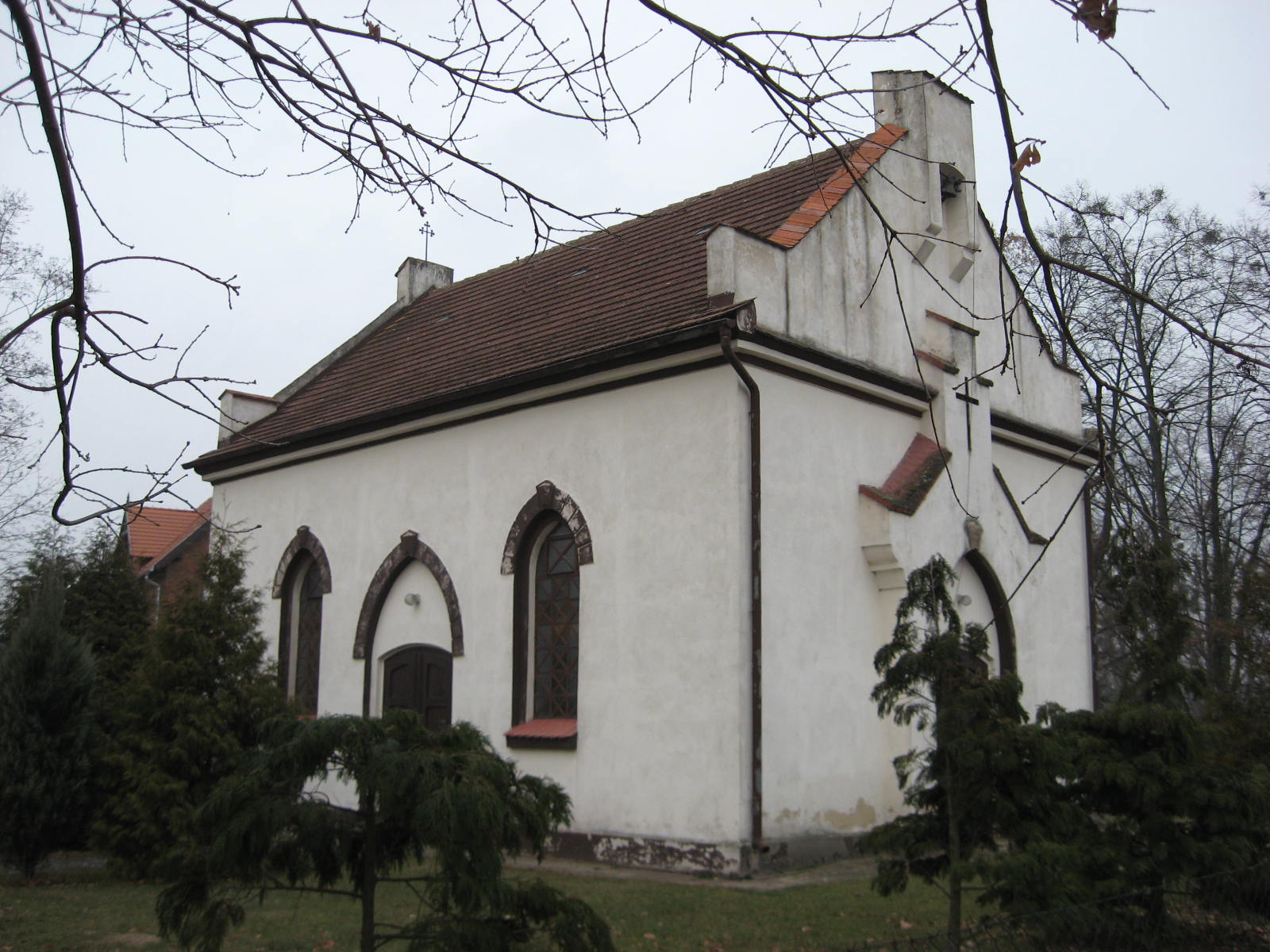
- Cemetery chapel in Ligota Dolna

- Location within Poland
- Coordinates: 50°58′N 18°10′E
- Country: Poland
- Voivodeship: Opole
- County: Kluczbork
- Gmina: Kluczbork

Population
  - Total: 642
- Time zone: UTC+1 (CET)
  - Summer (DST): UTC+2 (CEST)
- Vehicle registration: OKL

Ligota Dolna [liˈɡɔta ˈdɔlna] is a village in the administrative district of Gmina Kluczbork, within Kluczbork County, Opole Voivodeship, in southern Poland.
