= Gmina Kluczbork =

Gmina Kluczbork Kluczbork Commune
- Gmina
- Flag Coat of arms

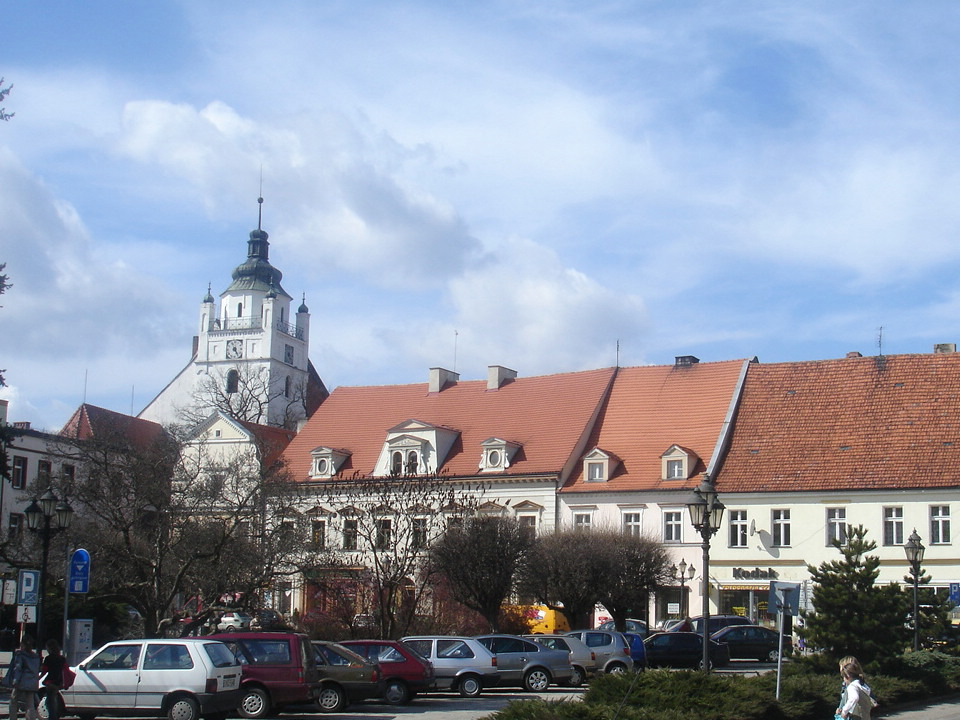
- Coordinates (Kluczbork): 50°59′N 18°13′E
- Country: Poland
- Voivodeship: Opole
- County: Kluczbork
- Seat: Kluczbork

Area
  - Total: 217 km^{2} (84 sq mi)

Population (2019-06-30)
  - Total: 35,896
  - Density: 165/km^{2} (428/sq mi)
  - Urban: 23,554
  - Rural: 12,342
- Website: https://www.kluczbork.eu

Gmina Kluczbork is an urban-rural gmina (administrative district) in Kluczbork County, Opole Voivodeship, in south-western Poland. Its seat is the town of Kluczbork, which lies approximately 41 kilometres (25 mi) north-east of the regional capital Opole.

The gmina covers an area of 217 square kilometres (83.8 sq mi), and as of 2019 its total population is 35,896.

The gmina contains part of the protected area called Stobrawa Landscape Park.

== Villages ==
Apart from the town of Kluczbork, Gmina Kluczbork contains the villages and settlements of Bąków, Bażany, Biadacz, Bogacica, Bogacka Szklarnia, Bogdańczowice, Borkowice, Czaple Wolne, Gotartów, Krasków, Krzywizna, Kujakowice Dolne, Kujakowice Górne, Kuniów, Ligota Dolna, Ligota Górna, Ligota Zamecka, Łowkowice, Maciejów, Nowa Bogacica, Przybkowice, Smardy Dolne, Smardy Górne, Stare Czaple, Unieszów and Żabiniec.

== Neighbouring gminas ==
Gmina Kluczbork is bordered by the gminas of Byczyna, Gorzów Śląski, Lasowice Wielkie, Murów, Olesno and Wołczyn.

== Twin towns – sister cities ==
Gmina Kluczbork is twinned with:

- Bad Dürkheim, Germany
- Berezhany, Ukraine
- Dzierżoniów, Poland
