= Borkowice, Kluczbork County =

Borkowice
- Village
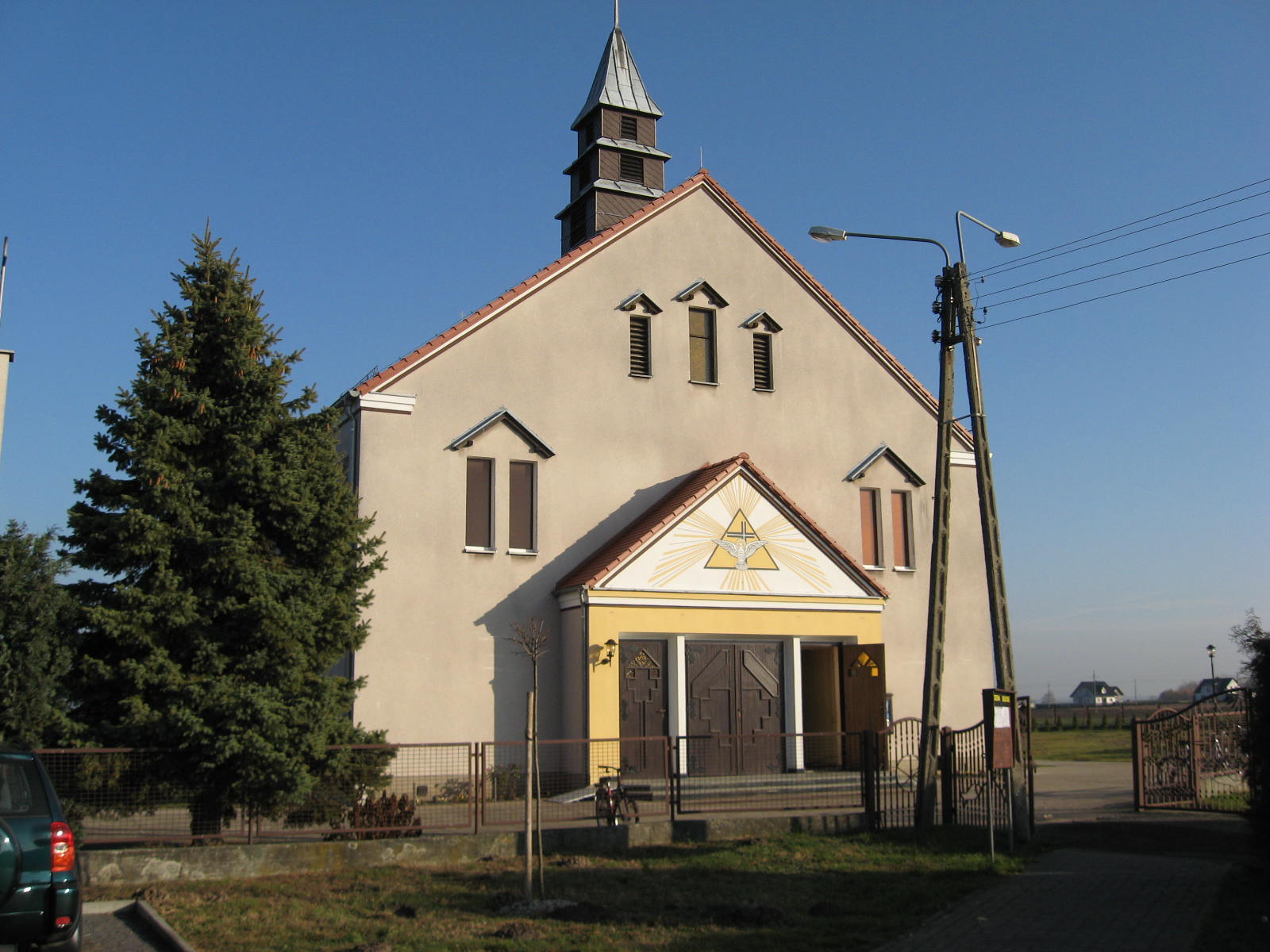
- Saint Joseph church in Borkowice

- Location within Poland
- Coordinates: 50°56′26″N 18°9′23″E
- Country: Poland
- Voivodeship: Opole
- County: Kluczbork
- Gmina: Kluczbork

Population
  - Total: 943
- Time zone: UTC+1 (CET)
  - Summer (DST): UTC+2 (CEST)
- Vehicle registration: OKL

Borkowice [bɔrkɔˈvit͡sɛ] is a village in the administrative district of Gmina Kluczbork, within Kluczbork County, Opole Voivodeship, in southern Poland.
