= Krasków, Opole Voivodeship =

Krasków
- Village
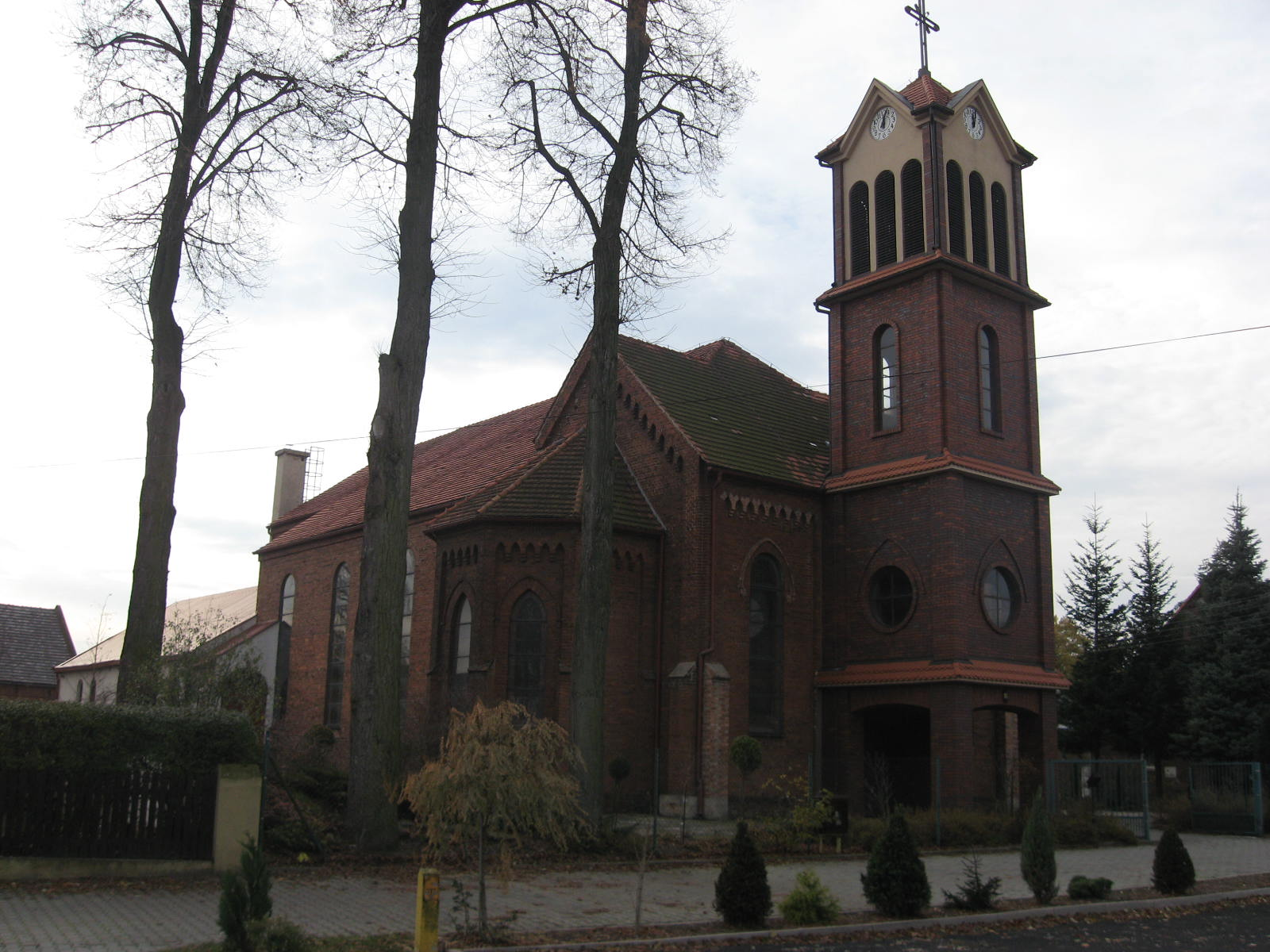
- Saint Jadwiga church in Krasków

- Location within Poland
- Coordinates: 50°58′20″N 18°10′30″E
- Country: Poland
- Voivodeship: Opole
- County: Kluczbork
- Gmina: Kluczbork
- Time zone: UTC+1 (CET)
  - Summer (DST): UTC+2 (CEST)
- Vehicle registration: OKL

Krasków [ˈkraskuf] is a village in the administrative district of Gmina Kluczbork, within Kluczbork County, Opole Voivodeship, in southern Poland.
