= Kuniów =

- Village
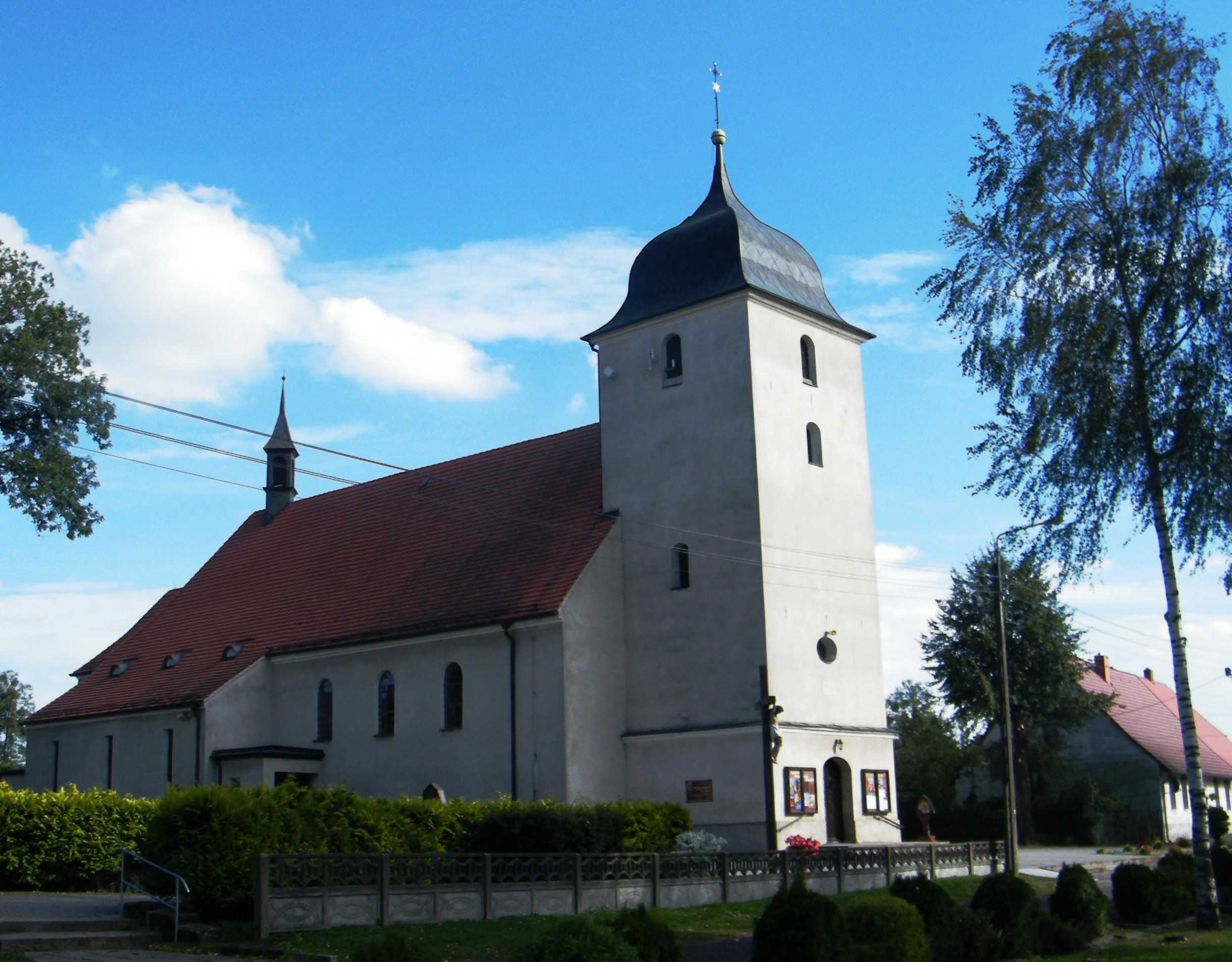
- Church of St. John the Baptist Birth in Kuniów

- Location within Poland
- Coordinates: 50°56′45″N 18°13′42″E
- Country: Poland
- Voivodeship: Opole
- County: Kluczbork
- Gmina: Kluczbork
- Time zone: UTC+1 (CET)
  - Summer (DST): UTC+2 (CEST)
- Vehicle registration: OKL
- Website: http://www.kuniow.pl

Kuniów [ˈkuɲuf] is a village in the administrative district of Gmina Kluczbork, within Kluczbork County, Opole Voivodeship, in south-western Poland.

The name of the village is of Polish origin and comes from the word koń, which means "horse".
