= Domanin =

Domanin or Domanín may refer to places:

== Czech Republic ==
- Domanín (Hodonín District), a municipality and village in the South Moravian Region
- Domanín (Jindřichův Hradec District), a municipality and village in the South Bohemian Region
- Domanín, a village and part of Bystřice nad Pernštejnem in the Vysočina Region

== Poland ==
- Domanin, Kępno County
- Domanin, Koło County
