= Wera Tools =

German tool manufacturer

Wera Werkzeuge GmbH
- Company type: GmbH
- Industry: Hand tools
- Founded: 1936 (Wuppertal, Germany)
- Headquarters: Wuppertal, Germany
- Products: Screwdrivers; VDE insulated screwdrivers; bits; torque wrenches; ESD screwdrivers; stainless steel tools; hex keys; dead blow hammers; socket wrenches; wrenches
- Owner: Bitburger Holding GmbH
- Number of employees: 1,500
- Website: www-de.wera.de/en

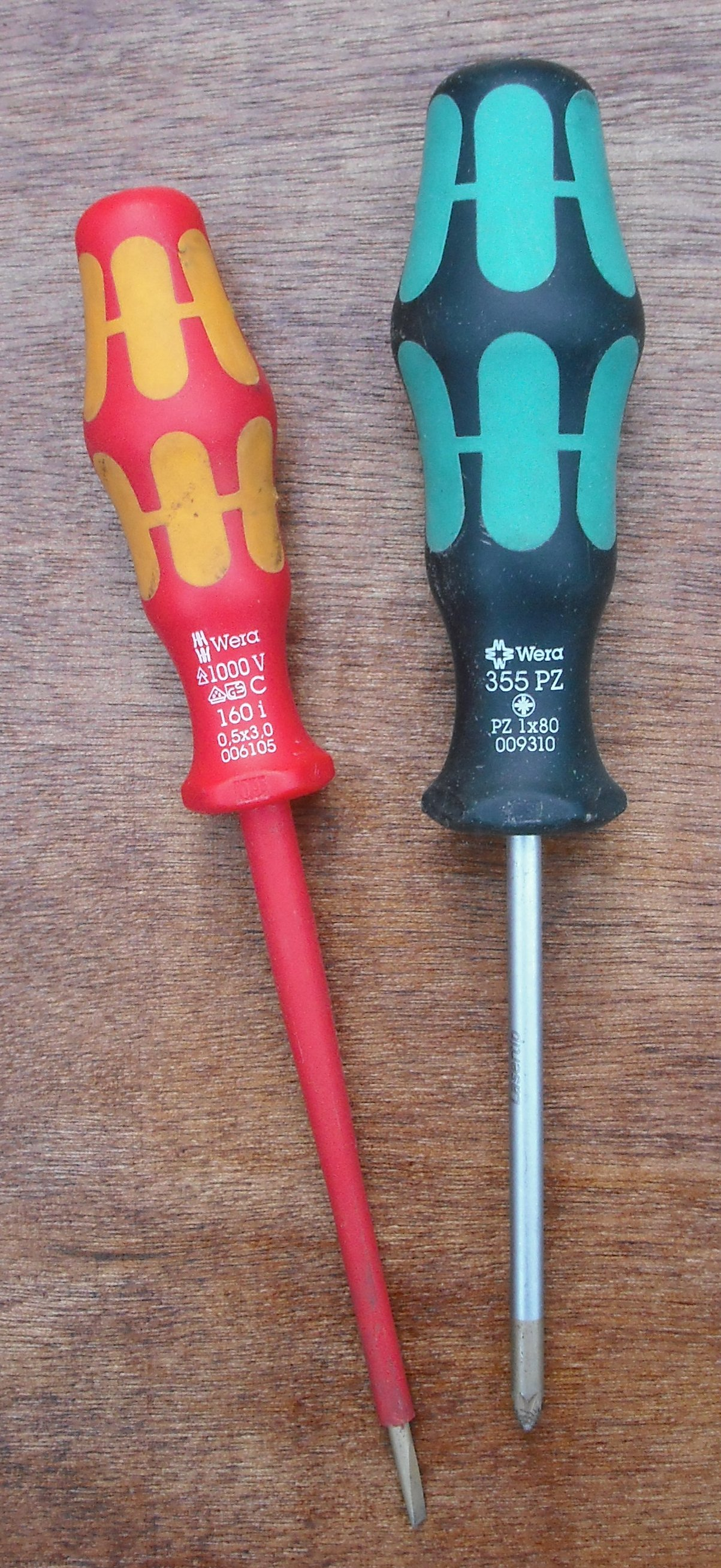
Wera screwdrivers

Wera Tools is the name for tool manufacturer Wera Werkzeuge GmbH with headquarters in Cronenberg (Wuppertal, Germany) and production in Bystřice nad Pernštejnem and Třebíč in the Czech Republic.

== History ==
In 1936, the businessman Hermann Werner founded Hermann Werner GmbH & Co. KG as a trading company for tools.

The company was destroyed during World War II. After 1945, reconstruction began under the management of Heinz Amtenbrink, the Werner family's son-in-law; and the manufacture of screwdrivers was added as a business segment. Since 1951, the company has been using the name Wera (from Werner and Amtenbrink) as its trademark. Production of bits began in 1963. In 1968, the company developed the Wera Kraftform screwdriver handle together with Fraunhofer Institute, which is still part of the Wera logo.

In the 1990s, the company introduced diamond-coated bits. Furthermore, Wera acquired Drehmax W. Holland and founded a sales subsidiary in the UK in 1993. Production was relocated to Bystřice in Moravia (Czech Republic) in 1995.

After the company's tools were frequently copied, the company repeatedly ordered the closure of trade fair stalls with counterfeit products.

Due to the owner's retirement, the company was sold to Bitburger Holding in 2016.

Wera Tools built a logistics centre on 20,000 square metres of land in Wuppertal in 2016. At that time, Wera employed over 750 people worldwide, including over 400 in the Czech Republic. In 2018, the company established a branch office in Třebíč.

Since 2019, Wera has been taking part in events such as the Montgolfiade, Kiel Week and the Balloon Cup in the Kitzbühel Alps with a hot air balloon in the shape of a screwdriver; the company has also cooperated with German music festivals such as Summer Breeze Open Air and Wacken Open Air.

== Corporate structure ==
Wera Tools is a global tool manufacturer. Its global headquarters and European sales team is based in Wuppertal, Germany. Wera has wholly owned regional subsidiaries, for example in the United Kingdom (based in Chesterfield, Derbyshire, England) and North America (based in Ontario, Canada), where it is known as Wera Tools Inc. Outside these areas, the company operates through a network of sales agents and wholesalers. Wera is a privately held company and employs more than 1,500 people. The company was fully acquired by Bitburger Holding in 2016.

Wera Tools designs and manufactures more than 3,000 tools for both manual and power tool applications at its German headquarters and its factories in Bystřice and Třebíč in the Czech Republic. Through its subsidiary Wera Tool Rebels GmbH, the company operates a Tool Rebels online shop for customers.

== Products and brands ==
Wera develops and sells products such as screwdrivers and screwdriver bits, ratchets and sockets, nut-spinners and L-keys as well as sets and compact tools.

Wera is known for its line of screwdrivers featuring the distinctive Kraftform shape handle. This design is based around the contours of the hand during screwdriver use, and uses a specifically designed combination of ergonomic soft zones and smooth, hard zones. The distinctive 'crowns' from this handle are used as part of the Wera logo.

Main German competitors are the manufacturer Wiha Tools, Gedore, Knipex and Hazet.

Other Wera developments and brands include:

- Joker Ratchet spanners with a nut holding feature
- Impaktor screwdriver bit system for cordless impact drivers, utilising TriTorsion and Diamond technology for longer life
- BiTorsion screwdriver bits
- Rapidaptor bit holders
- The Hex-Plus screw profile, prevents rounding out when compared with the traditional hex profile
- Zyklop multi-function swivel-head ratchet and sockets
- The Koloss, a ratchet that can also be used as a hammer
- The Chiseldriver, a screwdriver that can be used as a chisel and hit with a hammer whilst remaining fully usable as a precision screwdriver
- Kraftform Kompakt tools, kits consisting of bit holders or bit-holding handles and a selection of screwdriver bits or blades, supplied in a hard case or soft belt pouch
- Wera Stainless, a range of tools manufactured from stainless steel that is tough enough to be used in industrial and commercial applications. This range solves several aesthetic and material problems associated with using conventional (carbon) steel tools with stainless steel fixings and fasteners.

== Awards ==
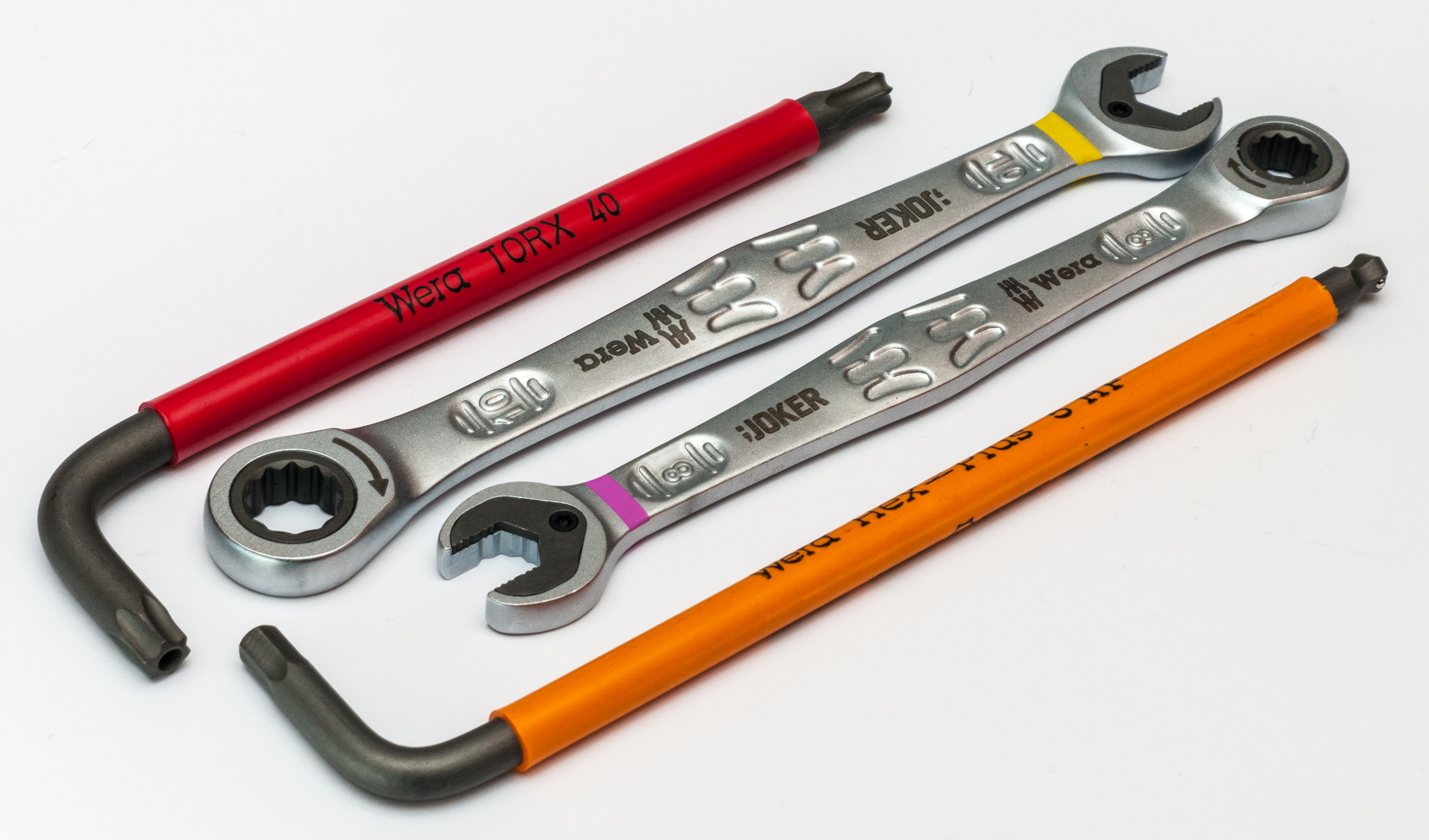
Wera wrenches and L-keys

Product Design:

- 1997, 2009, 2012 and 2013: (Discipline Product): iF Product Design Award
- 2015 (Discipline Packaging): iF Product Design Award
- 2015 (Discipline Packaging – gold): iF Product Design Award
- 2014: Red Dot Design Award best of the best
- 2015: Red Dot Design Award

Communication Design:

- 2014: Red Dot Design Award
- 2015: German Design Award

Brand management:

- 2015–2017: German Brand Award

Award for innovation:

- 2007: Top Innovator

"Partner des Fachhandels" – industrial trade partner:

- 2016: 1st place in the hand tools category
- 2021: 1st place in the hand tools category
