= Wiha Tools =

German tool manufacturing company

Wiha Tools logo

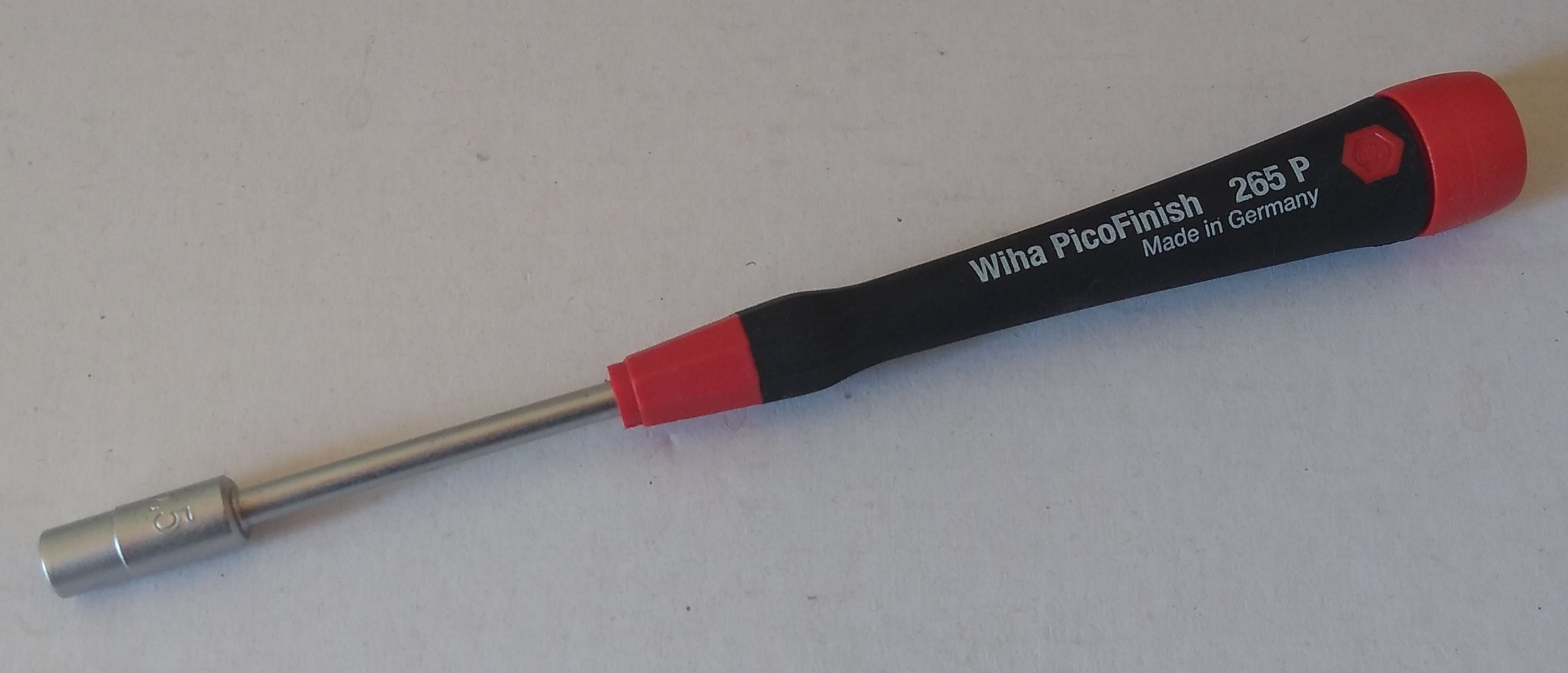
Wiha socket wrench

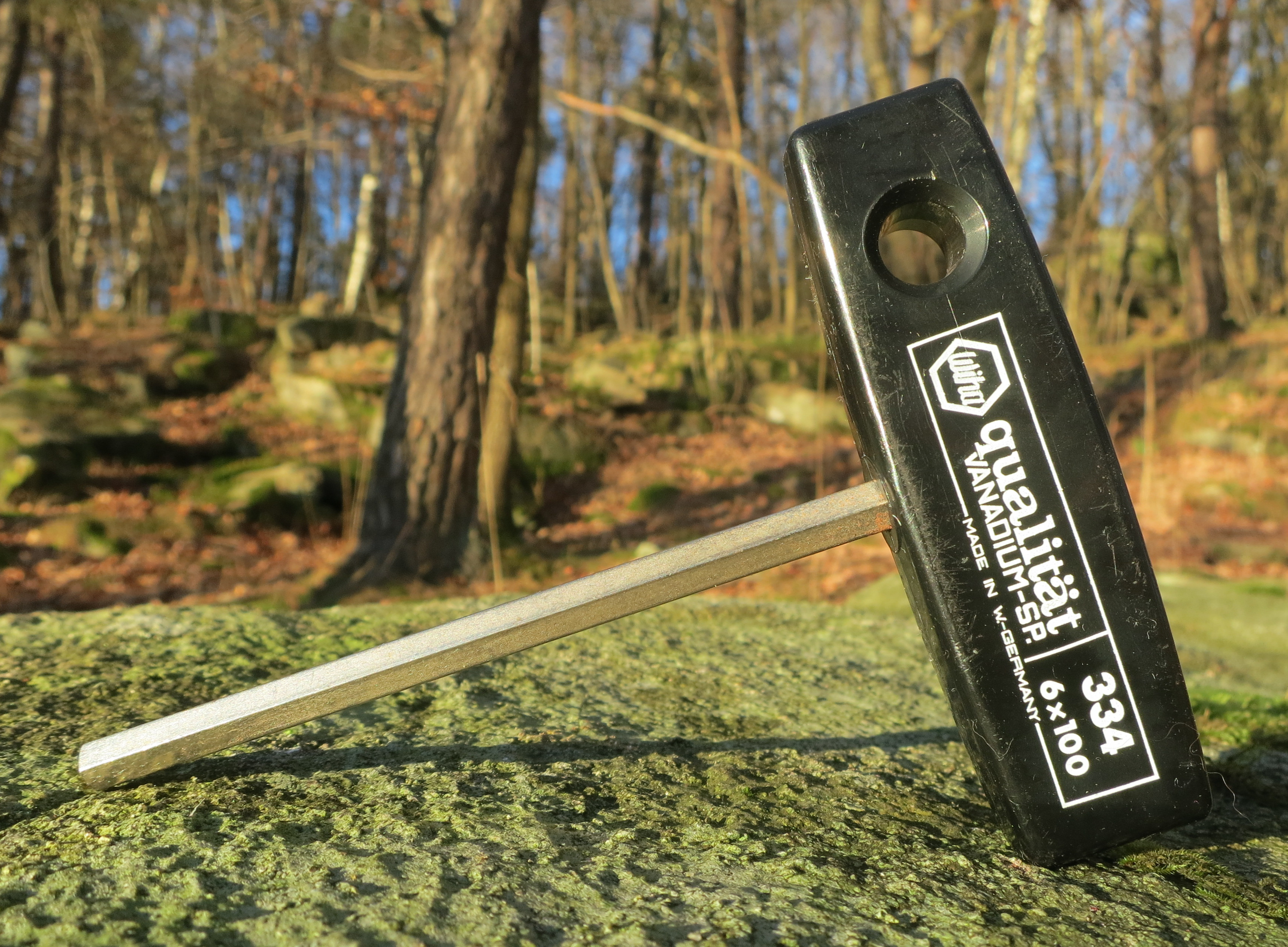
1980s T-handle hex key by Wiha

Wiha Tools is a manufacturer of hand tools for use in trade and industry, with its headquarters in Schonach im Schwarzwald in Baden-Württemberg, Germany.

== History ==
The company was founded in Wuppertal in 1939 by Willi Hahn. The region in the Bergisches Land between Remscheid, Solingen and Wuppertal was the early center of the tool industry, as metal ores were mined there and many forges were located along the rivers. The initial syllables of Willi Hahn's name form the company name. Four years later the company headquarters were relocated to Schonach. While initially only nuts and bolts were manufactured, eight years later in 1947 the production of screwdrivers commenced. The other core product groups were gradually built in the following years. In 1966 the plant in Mönchweiler/Black Forest was acquired - now housing the blades and L-keys production. In 1985 a subsidiary was founded in the United States (today's Willi Hahn Corp.) Over the years further branches were established in France, Spain, England, Denmark, Poland, China and Vietnam. Next to follow were Wiha Thailand, Canada, and Asia Pacific.

The company lists 3,500 different hand tools in its stock catalogue, including screwdrivers, torque wrenches and L-keys, bits, pliers, hammers and measuring tools. The owner managed company employs 750 staff worldwide.

Main German competitors are the manufacturer Wera Tools, Gedore, Knipex and Hazet.

Since 2010 the company is title sponsor of the regional basketball team Wiha Panthers Schwenningen.

== Awards ==
Wiha has repeatedly received awards for product design, innovation and social commitment – amongst these, almost 20 iF Awards, including gold for the Wiha magazine bit holder and about 10 Red Dot Awards, including the Red Dot Best of the Best.
