= Józef Stawinoga =

Homeless Polish man who lived in England

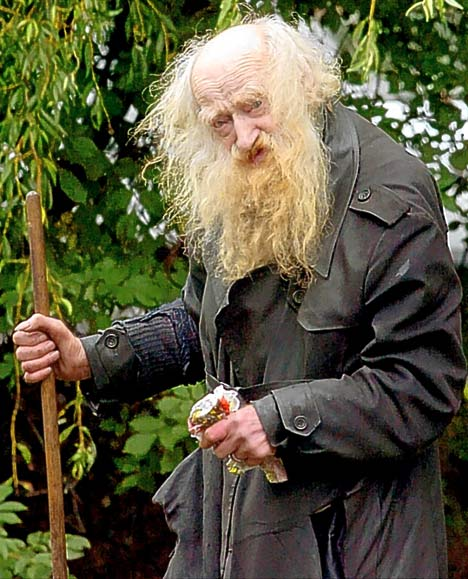
- Born: 15 December 1920; Krążkowy, near Kępno, Poland
- Died: 28 October 2007 (aged 86); Wolverhampton, West Midlands, England
- Other names: Fred, Trampee, Shakespeare
- Occupation: Hermit
- Known for: Lived in a public place for more than 40 years, gaining a local reputation as a hermit

Józef Stawinoga (15 December 1920 – 28 October 2007), also known as Fred and incorrectly reported as Josef, was a homeless Polish man who lived in a tent on the Wolverhampton Ring Road in the West Midlands, England, for nearly 40 years.

== Early life ==
Stawinoga was born in Krążkowy, near Kępno, Poland. Little is known about his early life, but he was thought to have been involved in the 1939 Soviet invasion of Poland, before emigrating to the UK in the 1940s. Correspondence with his nephew Roland Stawinoga, the grandson of Józef's father, Robert Stawinoga, however, revealed that he served for the German armed forces in Africa under General Rommel; after the defeat at El-Alamein in November 1942, he became an English prisoner of war in Egypt. Roland Stawinoga said, "Someone noticed that he spoke good Polish and that he had a Polish mother, so he was allowed to join the Polish army in England. That was how he survived, but he had suffered mental problems because of his experiences in the war."

== Wolverhampton ==
After the war Stawinoga lived in Wolverhampton, finding work and a place to live—and an Austrian wife who left him after a year, according to Juliusz Leonowicz, who identified himself as Stawinoga's friend. Official records show that Stawinoga married Hermine Weiss in Wolverhampton in 1952.

It has been reported that he had worked for some time at the Stewarts & Lloyds steelworks in Bilston. One day, however, he did not turn up to work and the next his colleagues knew "... he was pushing a pram with all his possessions and had grown an ankle-length beard."

It seems, therefore, that, at a date that may be 1954 he opted out of society for unknown reasons, left his job, and became homeless. By the 1970s he had moved into a tent on the central grass reservation of the town's inner ring road. The council tolerated his presence, as he was claustrophobic, and he became something of a local character. A series of replacement tents was erected by the authorities over his original plastic sheeting; in April 2003 this involved "an operation involving the army, the police, social services and environmental health".

Stawinoga had been adopted, over the last decade of his life, by the local Hindu community who believed his lack of possessions echoed that of some holy men in India. A group devoted to him on the social networking site Facebook had over 6,500 members and he was awarded an honorary degree by Wolverhampton Polytechnic. Over the years Stawinoga was often seen by drivers on the busy dual carriageway, sweeping up leaves for council workmen to collect.

== Death ==
Józef Stawinoga died on 28 October 2007, aged 86. Wolverhampton City Council announced that it would cover the cost of his funeral if none of his family came forward, and the possibility of a memorial to him has been discussed. His tent was removed by the council at the request of West Midlands Police, who were concerned that the area would become a tourist attraction. His funeral was held at the West Chapel of Bushbury Crematorium in Wolverhampton on the afternoon of 15 November 2007. Just over 20 people attended the service, which was conducted in Polish, by a Roman Catholic priest.

After Stawinoga's death his friend Leonowicz said that he had been told that the hermit had been a member of the SS during World War II. Such rumours were later dispelled, however, by the Simon Wiesenthal Center, the international Jewish human rights organisation. A spokesman from the Israeli office of the organisation, Dr Efraim Zuroff, said there was "no evidence of his service with the Germans" adding "Poles were not allowed to serve in the SS. It is simply not true." This was further confirmed by Major Antony Rudzki, a member of the Polish community in Wolverhampton, who demobilised Stawinoga in Wrottesley Park after the war.

On 6 March 2008 it was reported that Stawinoga had left thousands of pounds' worth of pension money that had been untouched. Wolverhampton Council traced the rightful heirs to Stawinoga's estate, two women and one man from Vienna, Austria, but their identities were not released. A BBC1 programme, Heir Hunters, broadcast on 21 July 2008, showed a search for heirs to his estate which had been listed on bona vacantia. The programme located the family in Germany but they were already making a claim themselves.

The three children of Stawinoga's sister Angela, who died in 2006, stood to inherit his estate. Stawinoga's nephew Robert told the Express & Star that his uncle had visited his family at the start of 1960 when they lived in Wiesbaden. He said, "Josef's sister Angela moved to Yugoslavia, now Croatia, after the war and got married. Her three children Donata, Renata and Armin Anic are the next of kin. Donata and Armin live in Croatia while Renata, aged 60, lives in Munich."

In 2009 it was announced that a bronze statue of Stawinoga was being designed by local artist and fellow Pole, Greg Rudevics from Oxley, Wolverhampton, who wanted a permanent memorial to Stawinoga erected in the city.
