= Olszowa =

Olszowa may refer to the following places:

- Olszowa, Lesser Poland Voivodeship (south Poland)
- Olszowa, Łódź Voivodeship (central Poland)
- Olszowa, Masovian Voivodeship (east-central Poland)
- Olszowa, Greater Poland Voivodeship (west-central Poland)
- Olszowa, Opole Voivodeship (south-west Poland)
