= Kliny =

Kliny may refer to places:

== Czech Republic ==
- Klíny, Ústí nad Labem Region

== Poland ==
- Kliny, Kutno County in Łódź Voivodeship (central Poland)
- Kliny, Opoczno County in Łódź Voivodeship (central Poland)
- Kliny, Lublin Voivodeship (east Poland)
- Kliny, Kępno County in Greater Poland Voivodeship (west-central Poland)
- Kliny, Poznań County in Greater Poland Voivodeship (west-central Poland)

== See also ==
- Klyny, the equivalent Ukrainian toponym
