= Eva Činčerová =

Eva Činčerová (16 November 1943 – 31 January 2005) was a Czech graphic designer, painter and printmaker.

== Life ==
A native of Pelhřimov, Činčerová studied painting and graphic arts at the Academy of Fine Arts, Prague from 1962 until 1968; her instructor there was professor Vojtěch Tittelbach and his assistant Ladislav Čepelák, who taught her graphic techniques. She devoted herself before all to the graphics techniques of etching and dry point in a large scale. Her human bodies were often designed in a life scale. For much of her career she was active in Prague and Jihlava.

She died in Bystřice nad Pernštejnem.

== Works ==
- Cycles of graphics: Lonely people, Portraits
- Book illustrations: Gustav Flaubert: Salambo (1980); Butterflies
- Cartoons

== Prize ==
The city of Jihlava awarded Činčerová its City Prize posthumously in 2009 for her lifetime achievements in the field of graphic art. Činčerová is represented in the collection of the National Gallery of Art.
