= Cronenberg Protestant Cemetery =

Cemetery in Germany

Evangelischer Friedhof Cronenberg
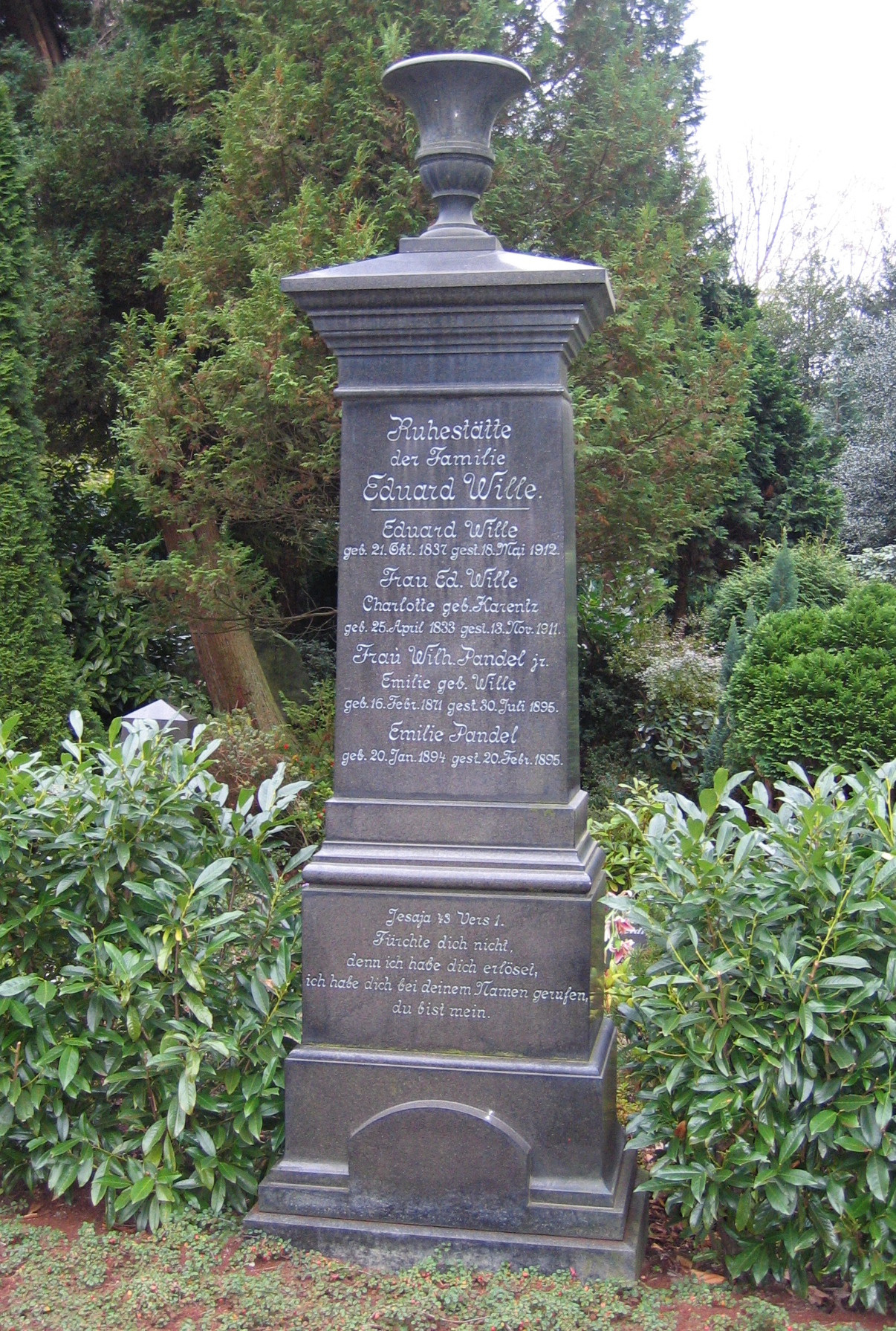

Details
- Established: 1783
- Location: Wuppertal
- Country: Germany
- Coordinates: 51°12′25″N 7°07′53″E
- Type: Protestant cemetery
- Website: Official website

Evangelischer Friedhof Cronenberg (German: Evangelischer Friedhof Cronenberg) is a historic church-operated Protestant cemetery in the Cronenberg district of Wuppertal. The cemetery is still used for burials.

== History and description ==
The history of the cemetery dates back to 1783. This burial ground was established by the Cronenberg Evangelical Protestant community. The first church building was erected in 1784 at the spot now occupied by the rectory. The present church building Emmaus Church was built in 1857.
