= Helko =

German manufacturer of axes

helko
- Industry: Manufacturing
- Founded: Germany (1844)
- Headquarters: Wuppertal, Germany
- Key people: Carl Helsper (founder)
- Products: axes, forestry tools
- Website: helko.de

Helko (stylised as helko and formally known as Helko Werk), is a German manufacturer of axes and forestry tools, located in the town of Wuppertal and founded in 1844. Today, it is one of the largest axe manufacturers in Europe, and exports products to more than 40 countries.

== History ==
The helko enterprise was started by a member of the Helsper family in 1844 in Cronenberg, now a district of Wuppertal. For many years, it was referred to as the Helsper Werkzeugfabrik, or Helsper Tool Factory. By the early 20th century, the Helsper Werkzeugfabrik had begun exporting axes to Africa, Asia, and the Americas.

In the early 1930s, a partner named Kotthaus joined the enterprise, and the company became known as Helko (Helsper / Kotthaus). When Helko took over the Helsper Werkzeugfabrik in the early 1960s, the complete company name in the German Register of Commerce became "Carl & Aug. Helsper GmbH & Co., KG, helko-werk". Nowadays, the factory name reads Helko - Werk GmbH., and is printed on axe handles as "Helko Werk".

== Product design ==
Helko axes and hatchets are crafted to meet stringent German DIN manufacturing standards (DIN 7287, 7294, 7295, 5131, and 5132).

In accordance with DIN directions, the hardness of Helko edges is between 47-56 HRC (Rockwell) up to 30 millimetres (1.2 in) from the cutting edge, while the eye is generally left unhardened to prevent cracks in the steel. During the manufacturing process, the axe heads are hardened and cooled down in an oil bath prior to being heated to around 400°C (752°F). This relieves strain on the surface of the steel after hardening, and provides the correct level of hardness. Unlike many axes which are cooled in a water bath, Helko tools are cooled in tepid oil to avoid small chinks in the material. Afterwards, the tools are sandblasted to remove oil residue from the surface prior to grinding and painting.

Via its Vario 2000 and Tomahawk product line, Helko also produces axes with interchangeable blades and handles.
