= Fritz Gromotka =

German World War II fighter pilot (1915–1979)

- Born: 2 June 1915; Kronschkow
- Died: 2 November 1979 (aged 64); Remscheid
- Military career
- Allegiance: Nazi Germany
- Branch: Luftwaffe
- Service years: ?–1945
- Rank: Leutnant
- Unit: JG 27
- Conflicts: World War II: Battle of Greece; Operation Barbarossa; North African Campaign; Operation Overlord; Defense of the Reich
- Awards: Knight's Cross of the Iron Cross

Fritz Gromotka (2 June 1915 – 2 November 1979) was a Luftwaffe ace and recipient of the Knight's Cross of the Iron Cross during World War II. Fritz Gromotka was credited with 29 aerial victories, 27 on the Western Front and 2 on the Eastern Front.

== Career ==
Gromotka was born on 2 June 1915 in Kronschkow, present-day Krążkowy, in the Prussian Province of Posen within the German Empire. In November 1940, he was posted to 6./JG 27, and during the Balkans Campaign of March–April 1941 claimed three victories over Greece, including two RAF Bristol Blenheim bombers of No. 211 Squadron on 13 April 1941. His first claim was Blenheim L8604 piloted by Flying Officer E. V. Thompson. His second claim was Blenheim L4819 piloted by flown by Flying Officer R. V. Herbert, in which Wing Commander Patrick Coote was flying. In both instances, all crew members died.

Unteroffizier Gromotka participated in the invasion of the Soviet Union in June 1941, claiming two DB-3 twin-engine bombers shot down on 25 June 1941 near Wilna. While returning from this mission, he ran out of fuel and forced-landed his Bf 109 E-8 near Minsk. He returned to his unit on 28 June.

Gromotka was posted to North Africa with II./JG 27 in September 1941. He was shot down in combat on 21 May 1942, but was unhurt after crash-landing. By June 1942 he had claimed a further four victories over the Desert Air Force. In July 1942 Gromotka served as instructor at Jagdfliegerschule 4.

He returned to JG 27 in December 1942, with 9. Staffel based in the Mediterranean theatre. From September to December 1943, Gromotka claimed another nine victories. He claimed a USAAF four-engine B-24 bomber on 5 October near Eratini.

In March 1944, III./JG 27 departed the Mediterranean for Reichsverteidigung duties and deployment in June to the Normandy Invasion front. On 2 July, Gromotka was shot down and wounded in his Messerschmitt Bf 109 G-6 during aerial combat. Gromotka was commissioned to Leutnant and was awarded the Knight's Cross of the Iron Cross (Ritterkreuz des Eisernes Kreuzes) on 28 January 1945 for 29 victories.

On 1 February 1945, Gromotka was appointed Staffelkapitän (squadron leader) of 9. Staffel of JG 27, succeeding Oberleutnant Kurt Heidenreich in this function. He held this position until the end of the war.

== Later life ==
Gromotka died on 2 November 1979 at the age of 64 in Remscheid, West Germany.

== Summary of career ==
=== Aerial victory claims ===
According to Obermaier, Gromotka was credited with 29 aerial victories claimed in 438 missions, and included 10 four-engined heavy bombers. Mathews and Foreman, authors of Luftwaffe Aces — Biographies and Victory Claims, researched the German Federal Archives and found records for 22 aerial victories, plus seven further unconfirmed claims, achieved in 438 combat missions. This figure includes two aerial victories on the Eastern Front and 20 over the Western Allies, including eight four-engined bombers.

Victory claims were logged to a map-reference (PQ = Planquadrat), for example "PQ 23 Ost 2951". The Luftwaffe grid map (Jägermeldenetz) covered all of Europe, western Russia and North Africa and was composed of rectangles measuring 15 minutes of latitude by 30 minutes of longitude, an area of about 360 square miles (930 km^{2}). These sectors were then subdivided into 36 smaller units to give a location area 3 km × 4 km (1.9 mi × 2.5 mi) in size.

Chronicle of aerial victories
This along with the * (asterisk) indicates an Herausschuss (separation shot)—a severely damaged heavy bomber forced to separate from his combat box which was counted as an aerial victory. This and the ? (question mark) indicates information discrepancies listed by Prien, Stemmer, Rodeike, Bock, Mathews and Foreman.
Claim	Date	Time	Type	Location	Claim	Date	Time	Type	Location
– 6. Staffel of Jagdgeschwader 27 – During the Balkan Campaign — 6 November 1940 – 11 May 1941
1	13 April 1941	16:06	Blenheim	southwest of Bitolj-Kenali	3? (Note: According to Mathews and Foreman this claim was unconfirmed.)	14 April 1941	—	Gladiator	
2	13 April 1941	16:09	Blenheim	southwest of Bitolj-Kenali					
– 6. Staffel of Jagdgeschwader 27 – Operation Barbarossa — 22 June – 19 July 1941
4	25 June 1941	10:45	DB-3	northeast of Vilnius	5	25 June 1941	12:45	DB-3	west-southwest of Vilnius
– 6. Staffel of Jagdgeschwader 27 – In North Africa — 22 September 1941 – 6 December 1942
6	29 November 1941	14:32	Hurricane	southwest of El Adem	8?	18 March 1942	08:30	P-40	southeast of Tobruk
7	23 February 1942	13:15	Blenheim	west of Sidi Barrani	9?	10 June 1942	07:40	Hurricane	Sidi Rezegh
– 9. Staffel of Jagdgeschwader 27 – Mediterranean theater — September – 31 December 1943
10	27 September 1943	11:20	Spitfire	1 km (0.62 mi) north of Kos airfield	15	10 November 1943	13:40	Beaufighter	west-southwest of Karpathos
11	27 September 1943	15:17	Spitfire	northwest of Kos airfield	16	4 December 1943	08:32	Baltimore	east of Kea
12	27 September 1943	16:15	Spitfire	north of the Galli island	17	6 December 1943	11:40	B-24	northwest of Eleusis
13	5 October 1943	12:53	B-24	PQ 23 Ost 2951, west of Erateini	18?	6 December 1943	—	B-24	west of Milos
14	8 October 1943	13:53	B-24	6 km (3.7 mi) north-northwest of Cape Pappas					
– 9. Staffel of Jagdgeschwader 27 – Defense of the Reich — 1 March – 6 June 1944
19	19 March 1944	13:50	B-24	25 km (16 mi) southeast of Marburg	? (Note: Mathews and Foreman list three claims over Boeing B-17 Flying Fortress bombers on 12 May 1944, two confirmed (12:30 and 12:38) and one unconfirmed (~12:50). Prien, Balke, Stemmer and Bock only list two confirmed claims on 12 May 1944.)	12 May 1944	12:38	B-17	30 km (19 mi) northeast of Hanau
20	12 April 1944	12:15	B-17	northwest of Wiener Neustadt	22?	12 May 1944	12:38? (Note: According to Mathews and Foreman claimed at approximately 12:50.)	B-17*	30 km (19 mi) northeast of Hanau
21	12 May 1944	12:30	B-17	30 km (19 mi) north-northeast of Hanau	23	28 May 1944	14:30	B-17	Wittenberg
– 9. Staffel of Jagdgeschwader 27 – In defense of the Normandy Invasion — 6 June – 15 October 1944
24	12 June 1944	14:05	P-47	Paris	26	19 August 1944	08:53	P-47	PQ 05 Ost S/UD 8-9, northwest of Paris
25	17 August 1944	14:48	Typhoon	PQ 04 Ost N/AC 1-2, vicinity of Dreux					
– 9. Staffel of Jagdgeschwader 27 – Defense of the Reich — November – 31 December 1944
27?	26 November 1944	11:15	P-51	north of Osnabrück					

=== Awards ===
- Aviator badge
- Front Flying Clasp of the Luftwaffe
- Iron Cross (1939) 2nd Class and 1st Class
- Honour Goblet of the Luftwaffe on 6 March 1944 as Oberfeldwebel and pilot (Note: According to Obermaier on 19 January 1944.)
- German Cross in Gold on 25 May 1944 as Oberfeldwebel in the 9./Jagdgeschwader 27
- Knight's Cross of the Iron Cross on 28 January 1945 as Leutnant and Staffelkapitän of the 9./Jagdgeschwader 27 (Note: According to Scherzer as Leutnant of the Reserves.)
