= Zosin, Greater Poland Voivodeship =

Zosin
- Village
- Location within Poland
- Coordinates: 51°18′24″N 17°58′22″E
- Country: Poland
- Voivodeship: Greater Poland
- County: Kępno
- Gmina: Kępno

Zosin [ˈzɔɕin] is a village in the administrative district of Gmina Kępno, within Kępno County, Greater Poland Voivodeship, in west-central Poland.
