= Dziekania =

- Village
- Location within Poland
- Coordinates: 51°18′56″N 17°57′24″E
- Country: Poland
- Voivodeship: Greater Poland
- County: Kępno
- Gmina: Kępno

Dziekania [d͡ʑɛˈkaɲa] is a village in the administrative district of Gmina Kępno, within Kępno County, Greater Poland Voivodeship, in west-central Poland.
