= Pustkowie Kierzeńskie =

- Village
- Location within Poland
- Coordinates: 51°19′1″N 18°5′6″E
- Country: Poland
- Voivodeship: Greater Poland
- County: Kępno
- Gmina: Kępno
- Population: 160

Pustkowie Kierzeńskie [pustˈkɔvjɛ kʲɛˈʐɛɲskʲɛ] is a village in the administrative district of Gmina Kępno, within Kępno County, Greater Poland Voivodeship, in west-central Poland.
