= Gmina Kępno =

Gmina Kępno Kępno Commune
- Gmina
- Flag Coat of arms

- Location within Kępno County
- Coordinates (Kępno): 51°17′N 17°59′E
- Country: Poland
- Voivodeship: Greater Poland
- County: Kępno
- Seat: Kępno

Area
  - Total: 124.03 km^{2} (47.89 sq mi)

Population (2006)
  - Total: 24,308
  - Density: 195.98/km^{2} (507.60/sq mi)
  - Urban: 14,710
  - Rural: 9,598
- Website: http://www.um.kepno.pl/

Gmina Kępno is an urban-rural gmina (administrative district) in Kępno County, Greater Poland Voivodeship, in west-central Poland. Its seat is the town of Kępno, which lies approximately 144 kilometres (89 mi) south-east of the regional capital Poznań.

The gmina covers an area of 124.03 square kilometres (47.9 sq mi), and as of 2006 its total population is 24,308 (out of which the population of Kępno amounts to 14,710, and the population of the rural part of the gmina is 9,598).

== Villages ==
Apart from the town of Kępno, Gmina Kępno contains the villages and settlements of Biały Młyn, Borek Mielęcki, Domanin, Dziekania, Hanulin, Kierzenko, Kierzno, Kliny, Krążkowy, Mechnice, Mikorzyn, Myjomice, Olszowa, Osiny, Ostrówiec, Przybyszów, Pustkowie Kierzeńskie, Rzetnia, Świba, Szklarka Mielęcka and Zosin.

== Neighbouring gminas ==
Gmina Kępno is bordered by the gminas of Baranów, Bralin, Doruchów, Kobyla Góra, Ostrzeszów and Wieruszów.
