= Gedore =

German tool manufacturing companies

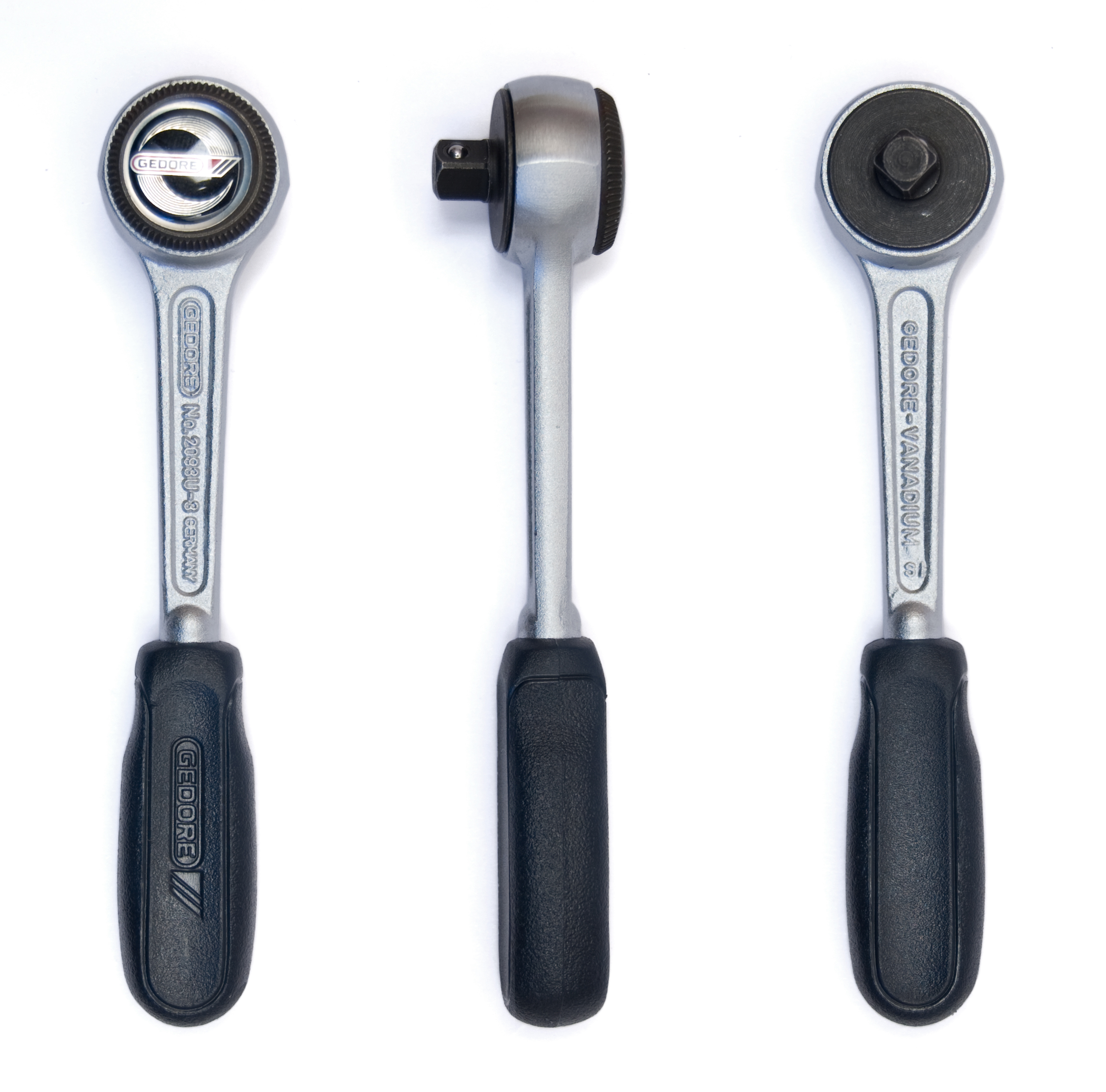

Gedore or Gedore Tool Group, is a global conglomerate of production and sale companies specialising in hand tools and other tool-making items. The company was founded in 1919 as Gedore Werkzeugfabrik Otto Dowidat KG by the three Dowidat brothers, Otto, Karl and Willi, who started the manufacturing of hand tools for industry from their hometown of Remscheid in Germany.

The company name Gedore is an acronym of GEbrüder DOwidat REmscheid.

In the 1960s the company began a policy of investing abroad and has since grown into a global organisation. The Group operates seven production facilities with manufacturing operations in Germany, Austria, the United Kingdom, Turkey, Brazil and South Africa.

The Group also has ten sales companies in various countries responsible for the marketing and distribution of its products. The Group employs around 2,000 people worldwide, including approximately 900 staff in Germany. The tool manufacturer has two product lines under the Gedore umbrella brand, GEDORE and GEDORE red, for hand tools and tool-based solutions, as well as the Ochsenkopf brand, which specialises in forestry and carpentry tools. Their product range spans 16,000 items.

Main German competitors are Wiha Tools, Wera Tools, Knipex and Hazet.

== History ==
The Gedore tool factory was founded in 1919 by three brothers, Otto, Karl, and Willi Dowidat. Starting with minimal capital, they began producing adjustable wrenches, iron hole punches, and other hand tools. In 1926, due to space constraints, the company relocated to Remscheid-Lüttringhausen, where the main factory and headquarters of the Gedore Group remain to this day.

After World War II, Gedore resumed production on a small scale, as the company was largely spared from war damage. However, family disputes led to a split in the business, with Otto Dowidat continuing under the name Gedore, while Willi Dowidat left the firm in 1949 and established the Dowidat-Werke. The third brother, Karl, had died in 1933, thus leaving Otto Dowidat as the sole owner.

During the post-war period, Gedore expanded significantly, employing 720 people at its main plant in Remscheid-Lüttringhausen. Following the death of founder Otto Dowidat in 1975, his son Karl took over the company's management. Today, the family business is managed by Karen Dowidat and her son Dr. Christian Dowidat, representing the 3rd and 4th generations of the family.

Over time, Gedore expanded its business by acquiring and starting up new companies, eventually forming a group of companies. In 2012, this group was reorganised into a holding company, laying the foundation for the current corporate framework. As part of this evolution, various brands were integrated into the Gedore Group. In 2018, these brands were unified under an umbrella brand structure to better align with market demands. Today, the Gedore umbrella brand comprises two lines: Gedore and Gedore red, both focusing on high-quality, safe hand tools and tool-based solutions. The traditional Ochsenkopf brand continues to be used for Gedore's forestry tools.

=== Expansions and acquisitions in Germany ===
Gedore's expansion within Germany began in 1961 when a shortage of labour in the Bergisches Land region prompted the company to relocate part of its production to Waldkirchen in the Bavarian Forest near Passau. This facility has since focused primarily on producing smaller-width wrenches and, more recently, forestry tools under the Ochsenkopf brand. In 1972, Gedore acquired Richard Abr. Herder KG (Rahsol) from Solingen, a company known for manufacturing torque tools. Today, these torque tools are developed and produced at Gedore's headquarters in Remscheid-Lüttringhausen, as part of Gedore-Werkzeugfabrik GmbH & Co. KG.

In 1985, Gedore expanded its portfolio by acquiring Hermann Bremer oHG (Habero) in Wuppertal, a company specialising in the production of hammers and chisels. Further growth occurred in 1993 with the establishment of Metec GmbH Metallwarentechnik in East Germany, where approximately 90 employees manufactured workshop trolleys and equipment until Metec exited the Gedore Group in 2012. In 1994, Gedore continued its expansion by acquiring two Remscheid-based companies: Dako Werk Dowidat GmbH & Co. KG, known for pipe tools, and Krumm KG, a manufacturer of puller tools and forged parts.

In 2002, Gedore expanded its operations by integrating several companies into its group. These included Carolus technic Hans Mesenhöller KG, Ochsenkopf-Werkzeugfabrik GmbH, and Klann-Spezial-Werkzeugbau GmbH. Ochsenkopf, a Wuppertal-Cronenberg-based manufacturer with a history of over 225 years, specialised in forestry and carpentry tools. Klann-Spezial-Werkzeugbau, based in Donaueschingen, focused on tools for the automotive industry and brought with it additional branches in the USA and France. This company now operates under the name Gedore Automotive.

In 2008, Gedore acquired Lösomat Schraubtechnik Neef GmbH, a company based in Vaihingen an der Enz that specialises in high-torque screw-driving technology. With a workforce of 44 employees, Lösomat had its own development department. After its integration into the Gedore Group, the company was renamed Gedore Torque Solutions.

In 2022, Gedore announced plans to close its Solingen plant and transfer production to the company headquarters in Remscheid. The 116 employees from the Solingen factory were slated to be integrated into the Remscheid plant by the end of 2022 in a process designed to be as smooth as possible.

=== Foreign expansions ===
Gedore expanded its international presence starting in 1958 with the establishment of its first foreign sales subsidiary, Technag B.V., in the Netherlands. In response to import bans in certain countries and a widespread shortage of skilled labour, Gedore opened its first foreign production facilities in the 1960s. The company's expansion began with Ferramentas Gedore do Brasil S/A joining the group in 1960, followed by the establishment of Gedore Tools SA (Pty) Ltd. in South Africa in 1964.

In 1972, Gedore Austria GmbH was established in Birkfeld, Styria, where 120 employees produce a wide range of pliers. The Austrian subsidiary received the Austrian State Award in 1981, allowing it to use the Austrian coat of arms in its business dealings.

Further international growth continued in 1999 with the acquisition of MHH Torqueleader, a British company specialising in torque tools and testing equipment, later renamed Gedore Torque Ltd. Gedore also founded numerous sales companies in Poland, Spain, Russia (until 2024), the USA, and China, among others.

In 2023, Gerrit Lucas was named Managing Director.

Most of Gedore's foreign plants primarily produce for their respective regional markets, with the exception of specialized operations like pliers and torque tools, which cater to global markets.

== Product range ==
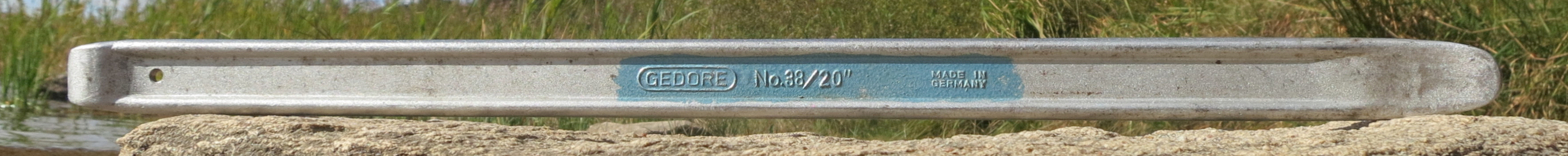
Tire mounting iron by Gedore.

Gedore develops and manufactures hand tools, including wrenches, ratchets, socket wrenches, pliers, impact tools, and torque tools, all produced in its factories. The company also offers workshop trolleys, workbenches, and toolboxes for various industries. In addition to standard tools, Gedore specialises in creating customised tools and special tools tailored for the automotive and high-torque sectors.
