= Rzetnia =

- Village
- Location within Poland
- Coordinates: 51°21′N 17°56′E
- Country: Poland
- Voivodeship: Greater Poland
- County: Kępno
- Gmina: Kępno
- Highest elevation: 215 m (705 ft)
- Population: 750

Rzetnia [ˈʐɛtɲa] is a village in the administrative district of Gmina Kępno, within Kępno County, Greater Poland Voivodeship, in west-central Poland.
