= Biały Młyn =

- Village
- Location within Poland
- Coordinates: 51°18′9″N 17°58′58″E
- Country: Poland
- Voivodeship: Greater Poland
- County: Kępno
- Gmina: Kępno

Biały Młyn [ˈbjawɨ ˈmwɨn] is a village in the administrative district of Gmina Kępno, within Kępno County, Greater Poland Voivodeship, in west-central Poland.
