= Kierzno, Greater Poland Voivodeship =

Kierzno
- Village
- Location within Poland
- Coordinates: 51°20′N 18°4′E
- Country: Poland
- Voivodeship: Greater Poland
- County: Kępno
- Gmina: Kępno
- Elevation: 150 m (490 ft)
- Population (approx.): 550

Kierzno [ˈkʲɛʐnɔ] is a village in the administrative district of Gmina Kępno, within Kępno County, Greater Poland Voivodeship, in west-central Poland.

The village has an approximate population of 550.
