= Ostrówiec, Greater Poland Voivodeship =

Ostrówiec
- Village
- Location within Poland
- Coordinates: 51°19′37″N 18°02′33″E
- Country: Poland
- Voivodeship: Greater Poland
- County: Kępno
- Gmina: Kępno
- Population: 600

Ostrówiec [ɔsˈtruvjɛt͡s] is a village in the administrative district of Gmina Kępno, within Kępno County, Greater Poland Voivodeship, in west-central Poland.
