= Borek Mielęcki =

- Village
- Location within Poland
- Coordinates: 51°19′N 17°55′E
- Country: Poland
- Voivodeship: Greater Poland
- County: Kępno
- Gmina: Kępno
- Population: 200

Borek Mielęcki [ˈbɔrɛk mjɛˈlɛnt͡ski] is a village in the administrative district of Gmina Kępno, within Kępno County, Greater Poland Voivodeship, in west-central Poland.
