= Świba =

- Village
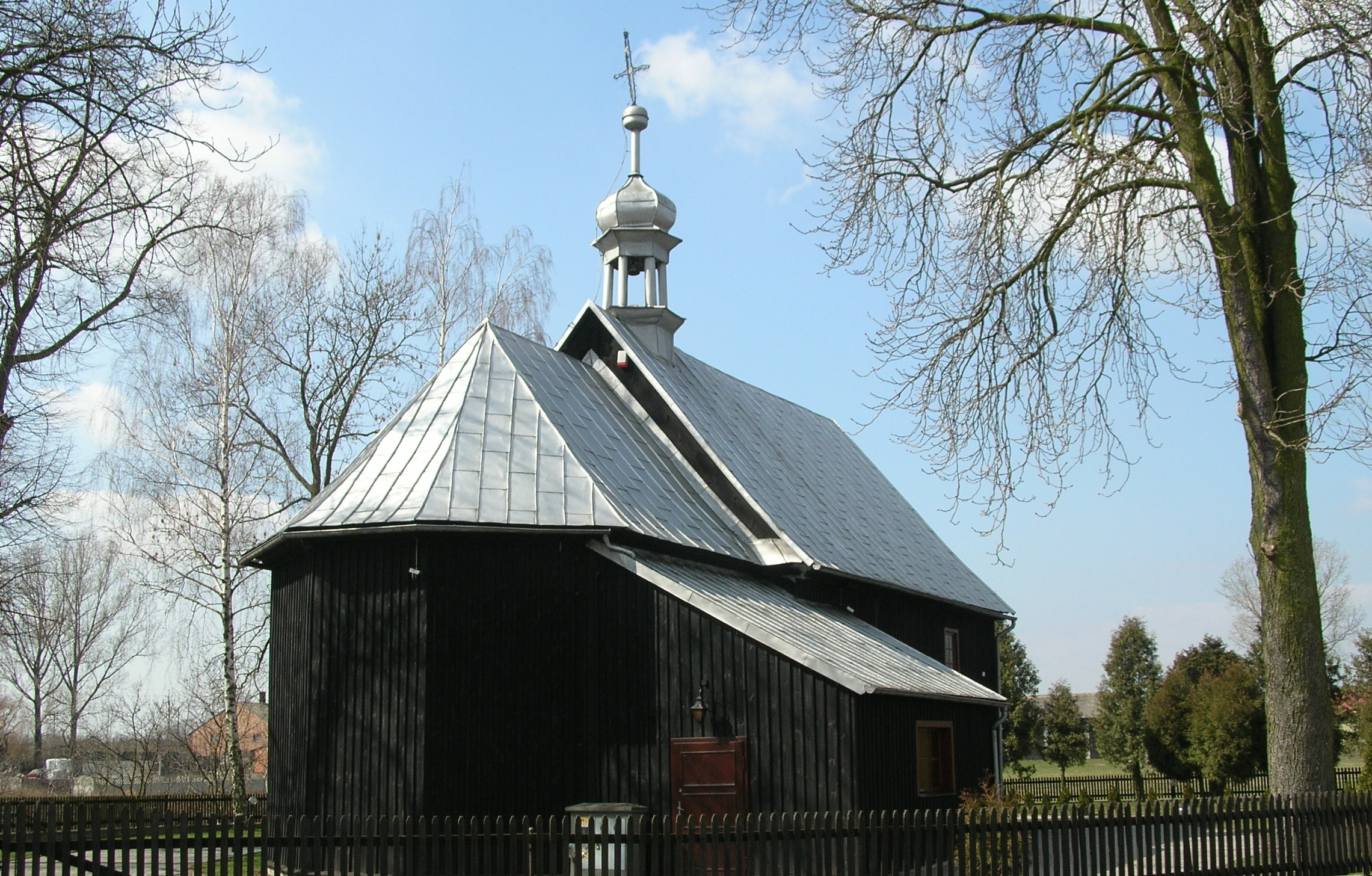
- Wooden church

- Location within Poland
- Coordinates: 51°18′N 18°5′E
- Country: Poland
- Voivodeship: Greater Poland
- County: Kępno
- Gmina: Kępno
- Population: 1,100

Świba [ˈɕfiba] is a village in the administrative district of Gmina Kępno, within Kępno County, Greater Poland Voivodeship, in west-central Poland.
