= Krążkowy =

- Village
- Location within Poland
- Coordinates: 51°17′N 18°0′E
- Country: Poland
- Voivodeship: Greater Poland
- County: Kępno
- Gmina: Kępno

Krążkowy [krɔ̃ʂˈkɔvɨ] is a village in the administrative district of Gmina Kępno, within Kępno County, Greater Poland Voivodeship, in west-central Poland.

== Notable residents ==
- Fritz Gromotka (1915–1979), Luftwaffe officer
