= Knipex =

German manufacturer of pliers and other tools

Coordinates: 51°12′40″N 7°08′45″E

KNIPEX
- Type: Privately owned
- Industry: Hand tools
- Founded: 1882 (Wuppertal, Germany)
- Headquarters: Wuppertal, Germany
- Products: Pliers, cutters, crimping tools, wire strippers, insulated tools
- Number of employees: Manufacturing: 1,800 Knipex Group total: 2,600
- Website: www.knipex.com

Knipex (English: /kəˈnɪpɛks/; German pronunciation: [ˈknɪpɛks]) is a globally-distributed German manufacturer of hand tools, best known for its pliers. Knipex tools are principally used by professionals in various trades but find increasing popularity in DIY and EDC markets.

For four generations Knipex has been an independent, owner-managed family company. The company is headquartered in Wuppertal, Cronenberg. All manufacturing of core products like pliers takes place in Wuppertal, Germany. Peripheral items such as tweezers are made elsewhere by contract manufacturers.

== History ==
=== First Generation ===
The company was founded as a forge in 1882 by Carl Gustav Putsch in the basement of his family home. The firm began with one employee and two apprentices. Until the 1960s the firm was known as the C. Gustav Putsch Drop Forged Pliers Works (Zangenfabrik-Gesenkschmiede). In its early days manufacture focused on carpenter's pincers and farrier's tongs, at first made by hand and then increasingly by drop forging hammers. At the apex of the company's success under Carl Putsch the forge had 27 employees and produced 7,000 pairs of pliers per week.

=== Second Generation ===
Carl Putsch ran the company until his death in 1927. In 1942 the second generation of ownership, also named Carl Putsch, registered the "Knipex" brand in Germany. During the economic expansion of West Germany in the 1950s Knipex added new and more specialized types of pliers to its catalog.

=== Third Generation ===
Karl Putsch took over as company manager in 1954. Manufacturing operations were increasingly automated. The development of new tool patents and product specialization was given greater emphasis.

=== Fourth Generation ===
Various subsidiary companies were acquired during an expansion campaign that began in the 1990s, enlarging the Knipex Group. Many foreign sales offices were established. Presently better than 60 percent of production is exported to more than a hundred countries worldwide. The Knipex group has been led by Ralf Putsch since 1996. He is the great-grandson of founder Carl Putsch.

== Products ==
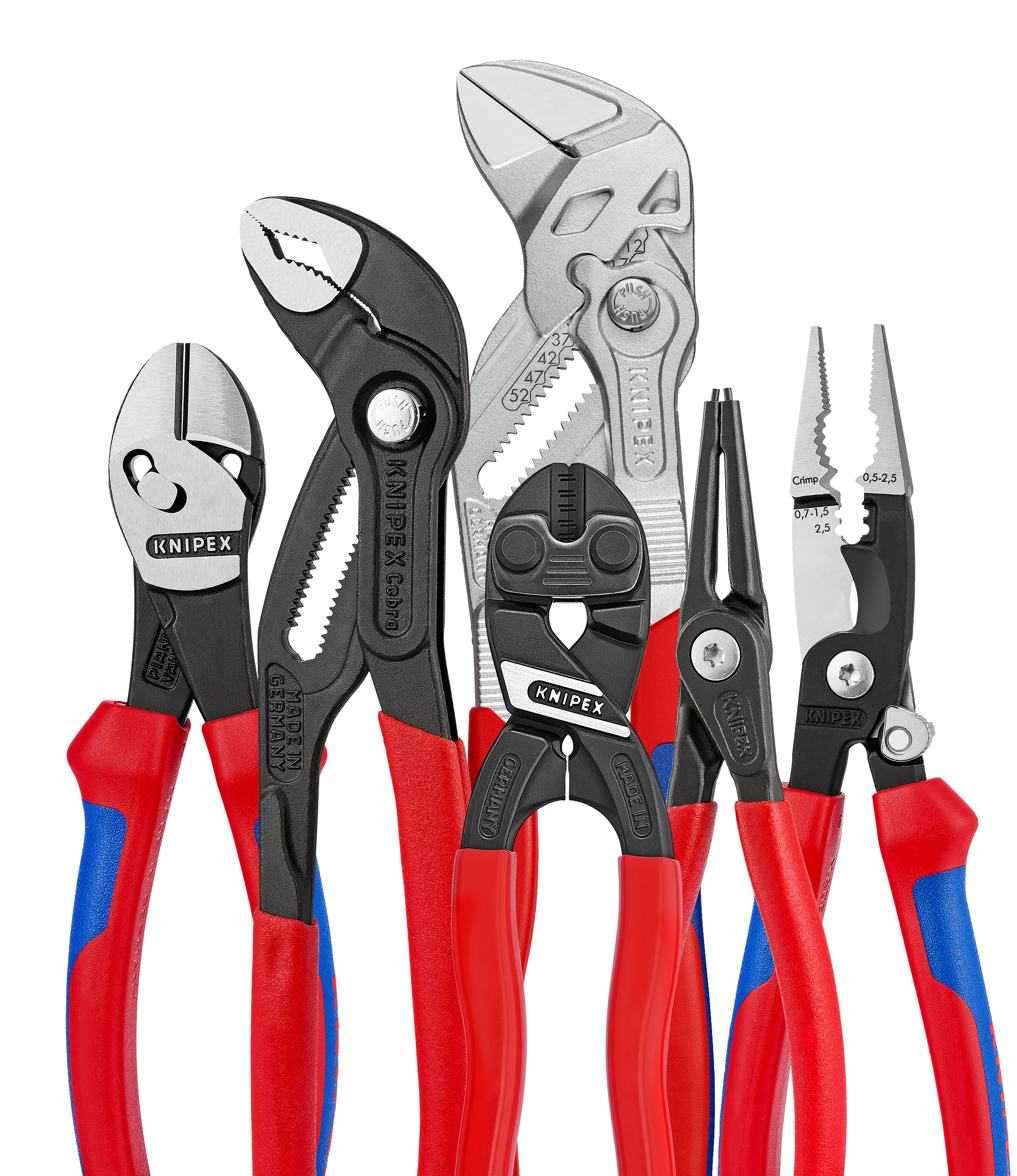
KNIPEX pliers. From left to right: Twinforce diagonal side cutters, Cobra pliers, a pliers wrench (top), Cobolt cutters (bottom), circlip pliers, and a combination electrician's pliers.

The tool catalog of Knipex encompasses about a hundred types of pliers, with more than 900 variants in length, handle design and finish. These tools include common items such as side cutters, electricians pliers, plumber's pliers as well as more specialized pliers for use in electronics. The range also includes special electrician's tools for cutting, stripping and crimping conducting wire. The tools specialized for electrical work find application in aerospace, solar power technology and optical fiber installation. Many of these tools are available in a parallel line of electrically insulated items, designed to protect users in cases of accidental contact from voltages up to 1 kV and the currents they may induce.

Most Knipex tools are readily identifiable by their bright red grips. These may be simple vinyl dips or injection moulded red-and-blue grips with integrated, softer polyurethane panels. Electrically insulated pliers are not offered with vinyl dip grips and are identified instead by their yellow-and-red injection moulded grips.

=== Decimal product codes ===
All Knipex products are identified by a decimal system. This takes the form of three groups of numbers (e.g., "12 12 14" or "26 16 200"), usually stenciled or printed on the tool's handle.

The decimals are decoded as follows: the first group indicates the model of the tool (type of pliers), the second its style (variety, shape or finish of its jaws) and the third some measure of its size (length of the tool or whether meant for metric or imperial gauges). The top-level categories encoded by the first two digits are summarized in the following table,

Code	Tool family	References
00	Tool sets, cases/bags & accessories (incl. tethering lanyards)	
03	Combination pliers	
08	Needle-nose combination pliers	
09	Lineman's pliers (American style)	
11	Insulation-stripping pliers (wirestrippers)	
12	Self-adjusting/precision insulation strippers (wirestrippers)	
13	Installation ("electrician's") pliers	
25	Snipe-nose ("radio") pliers (long/half-round)	
26	Snipe-nose side-cutting pliers (incl. Stork Beak)	
30	Long-nose/needle-nose pliers	
35	Electronics precision pliers	
44	Internal Circlip pliers (i.e., "J" code pliers)	
46	External Circlip pliers (i.e., "A" code pliers)	
49	Precision circlip pliers	
64	End-cutting nippers	
70	Diagonal cutters (side cutters)	
71	CoBolt compact bolt cutters	
72	Diagonal cutters for plastics/flush cutters	
74	High-leverage diagonal cutters	
77	Electronics diagonal cutters (box joint)	
78	Electronic Super Knips wire cutters	
79	Electronics diagonal cutters	
86	Pliers Wrench	
87	Cobra water pump pliers	
88	Alligator water pump pliers	
92	Precision tweezers/stainless-steel pliers	
95	Cable shears/cable cutters	
97	Crimping pliers	
98	Insulated (VDE, 1kV) tools	

A letter sometimes follows this decimal code to indicate a special feature of the tool, such as a T for "tethered", indicating a tool with an integrated attachment point for a tool tether designed to prevent loss if dropped from a height, or to protect machinery into which an untethered tool might fall. The A code represents external circlip pliers whereas the J code indicates internal circlip pliers.

=== Leading product lines ===
Knipex has acquired a reputation for high-quality hand tools, some of which are considered best-in-class. Knipex tools frequently mentioned in this sense include:

- Cobra pliers, water pump pliers whose jaw-width can be adjusted with a push-button using one hand (1984) which replaced the earlier Alligator pliers,
- Cobolt cutters, high-leverage miniature bolt cutters (1988),
- Pliers wrenches, parallel jaw, ratchet action wrenches meant to replace sets of crescent wrenches (1994),
- Twinforce Side and diagonal cutters,
- Wire stripping and crimping tools.

=== Competitors ===
Knipex's main competitors in the German market are Gedore, Wiha and Hazet.

== Manufacturing ==
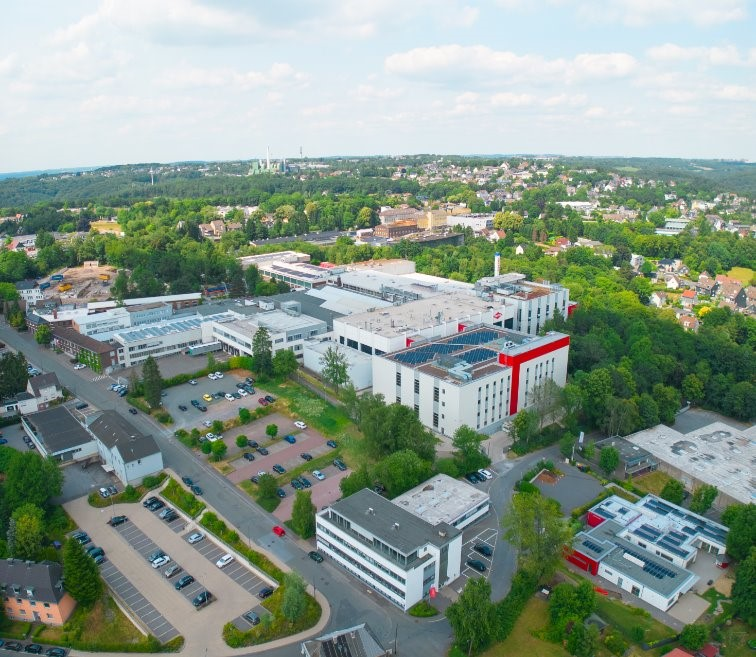
KNIPEX_factory in Wuppertal, Germany

Knipex has pursued a corporate strategy of specializing in pliers combined with complete in-house manufacturing. In addition to drop forges that use company-made dies Knipex's production process also includes in-house machining operations such as broaching, drilling, milling, grinding and laser machining.

== Employment ==
More than 1,700 staff are employed at their Wuppertal factory and offices. This number includes 70 trainees (Auszubildende) who pursue various apprenticeships. Apprentices labour in a special workshop dedicated to industrial instruction.

Knipex adheres to the collective bargaining agreement of the German Metal- and Electrical Industry.

== Structure ==
Knipex is the parent company of the Knipex Group. The largest umbrella of the Knipex corporate entity employs more than 2,600 people. These workers are spread over four German production companies as well as in a number of international sales offices located in the United States, Russia, China, the Middle East and Mexico.

In Germany the Knipex group comprises,

- Rennsteig Werkzeuge in Viernau, Thüringen (acquired in 1991 for its crimping and wirestripping tools)
- Orbis Will GmbH + Co. KG in Ahaus, Münsterland (acquired in 2003 for its expertise in injection moulding of handles and private label manufacturing)
- Will in Neustadt, (acquired in 2006); now part of Orbis Will
- LMIS Software in Osnabrück (majority stake acquired in 2017)

=== North America ===
Knipex Tools LP is the North American sales and marketing branch of the Knipex Group. It has offices and a warehouse in Buffalo Grove, Illinois.

== Knipex museum ==
The company home in Wuppertal features a two-story corporate museum that houses machinery, tools, preserved workplaces and everyday objects meant to relate working and living conditions during the history of that region's tool industry. The museum is open to the general public once per year as part of the Wuppertal-24h-live event and to groups year-round by appointment.

== Sources ==
- The Popular Mechanics Magazine featuring the Knipex Pliers Wrench
- Klaus Koch: Weltklasse – Marktführer aus Wuppertal. Girardet Verlag, Düsseldorf 2003, ISBN 3-00-012682-1.
- Jürgen Eschmann: Wirtschaftsstandort Cronenberg. Die Unternehmen, die Menschen, die Produkte. Wuppertal 2007, S. 74 ff.
- Ohne Knipex bleibt der Airbus unten - Press article in the Westdeutschen Zeitung - Newspaper
- Innovative Zangen packen besser zu - Press article in the Westdeutschen Zeitung - Newspaper
