= Olszowa, Greater Poland Voivodeship =

Olszowa
- Village
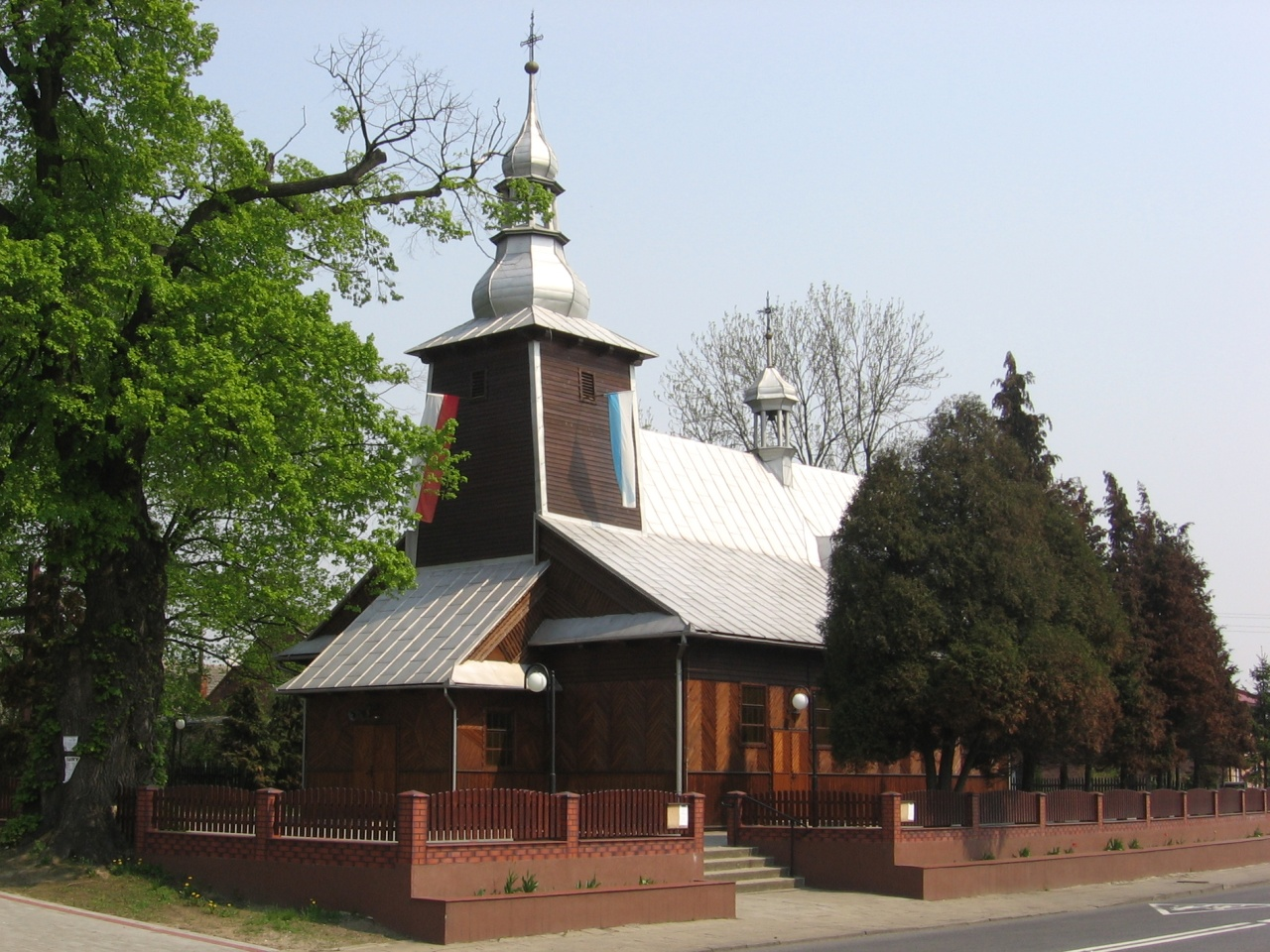
- St. Hedwig Church

- Location within Poland
- Coordinates: 51°17′45″N 18°2′36″E
- Country: Poland
- Voivodeship: Greater Poland
- County: Kępno
- Gmina: Kępno
- Population: 1,000

Olszowa [ɔlˈʂɔva] is a village in the administrative district of Gmina Kępno, within Kępno County, Greater Poland Voivodeship, in west-central Poland. The village is on national road number 8, which is a part of the European route E67.

== History ==
The first reference to the village's name comes from 1266. When it was mentioned in the 1305 Liber fundationis episcopatus Vratislaviensis, the village was paying a tithe to the bishop of Wrocław. In 1360 it was among the 23 villages given for life to Stefan Gromassy, a canon (priest) from Poznań, provided that he would help them financially. In the 17th century the owners were Jan Szyszkowski, district magistrate of Kalisz, and Mikołaj Szyszkowski, chamberlain of Wieluń. After the Second Partition of Poland, Olszowa became part of the Kingdom of Prussia and fell under the district of Kempen im Possen.

During the 19th and the first half of the 20th century Olszowa was divided into three Gutsbezirke (Polish: obszary dworskie, English: country manor areas). In the Interbellum period, Olszowa I was owned by Witold Daszkiewicz, Olszowa II Podgórze (English: roughly translates as at the bottom of/near a hill) by Jan Paetzold, and Olszowa III Podmiejska (English: Suburban) belonged to Franciszek Wunschik.

After World War I, it became part of the Second Polish Republic due to the success of the Greater Poland Uprising. Following the invasion of Poland and the outbreak of the Second World War in September 1939, Olszowa was occupied by the Wehrmacht and annexed by Nazi Germany. The village was then renamed Erlenbrunn until 1943, and then Erlenhöh until 1945. It was administered within Reichgau Wartherland until the end of the war in 1945. The Red Army liberated the village on January 21 after a brief resistance from the Nazi Army.

Following the war, Olszowa became part of the People's Republic of Poland. It fell under the jurisdiction of the Poznań Voivodeship from 1946 until 1975, when, due to the reform of the administrative divisions in Poland, it was included in the newly formed Kalisz Voivodeship. Since 1 January 1999, Olszowa has been part of the Greater Poland Voivodeship.

== Country manors ==
There used to be three manors in Olszowa, two of which remain.

The Daszkiewicz family manor was built at the turn of the 19th century. It is a brick, single-storey house with a central entrance. As a result of the post-war nationalization, the manor was turned into a building for the primary school that functions to this day. Franciszek Wunschik's manor was constructed in the 19th century. It resembles a miniature castle with neo-Gothic towers in the corners. After 1945, the manor was rebuilt. The previous entrance was walled and is now marked by a triad of arcades. In 1981–2000, the building served as the local kindergarten.

== Church ==
The first parish church, under the patronage of St. Nicholas, was erected at the end of the 13th century. During the reformation period the temple, belonging to the Protestants, fell under the administration of the Baranów Parish.

In 1623, the suffragan bishop of Wrocław, Marcin Kolsdorf, consecrated a new church, which, on July 11, 1659, was endowed by Jan Szyszkowski. Either during the consecration or in 1659, the parish was renamed as St. Hedwig parish in honor of St. Hedwig, the patron of Silesia and the patron of Jan Szyszkowski's wife, Jadwiga Zaremba. The church founded by the Szyszkowskis was destroyed and in its place, in 1749, was built a new wooden baroque church based on the layout of the Latin cross.

Before the Second World War, the parish priest built the grotto of the Blessed Virgin Mary of Lourdes and organized the construction of the Catholic House (Polish: Dom Katolicki) in 1937. The Nazis closed the church in 1941 and stole the liturgical vessels and accessories. The restoration of the church took place in 1982–1985. The repairs were carried out by Gorals from Podhale – specialists led by Jan Migel from Bańska Dolna. The outside of the building was covered with wood and, because of the damaged tower, the church was widened. Inside, the walls were lined with larch wood.

On the high altar there is a Renaissance triptych painted in 1595, depicting the crucifixion scene with figures of the kneeling founders at the foot of the cross. The wings of the triptych show St. Stanislaus and St. Elizabeth; on their reverse are the figures of Christ and the Mother of Sorrows. The predella illustrates The Last Supper. The painting of St. Hedwig (dated 1620–1630) in the north side-altar comes from the Mikołaj Szyszkowski foundation. The south side-altar created in the Rococo style is from the second half of the 18th century and portrays Mary, the Mother of Sorrows.

== Other sources ==
- Daszkiewicz, Krystyna (1998). Zamkniety rozdział. Szczecin: Wydawnictwo Naukowe Uniwersytetu Szczecińskiego.
- "Kepno – Urząd Miasta i Gminy". Archived from the original on 2012-02-09.
- Liebert, Aleksander (2011-11-02). "W stylu podhalańskim (Polish, English: In the Podhale style) Opiekun 325-21". Archived from the original on 2016-03-04.
