= Stahlwille =

German engineering company

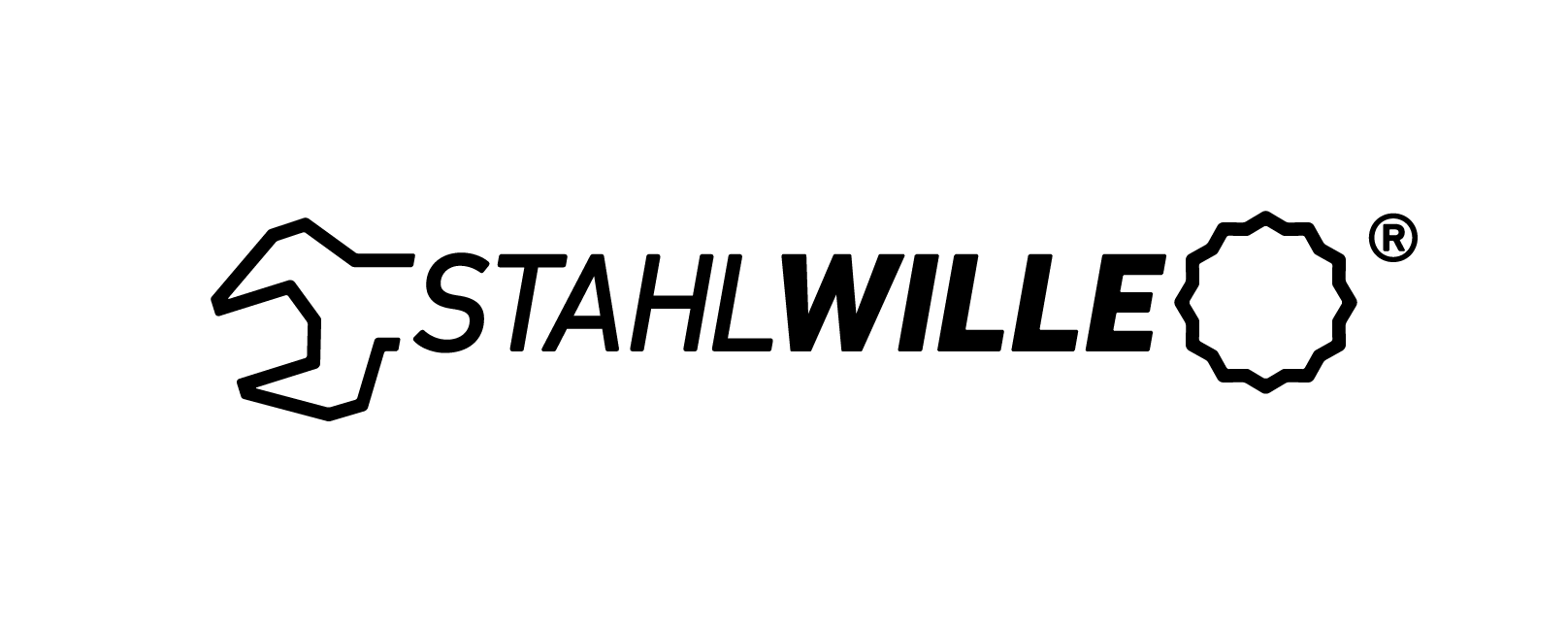
Logo

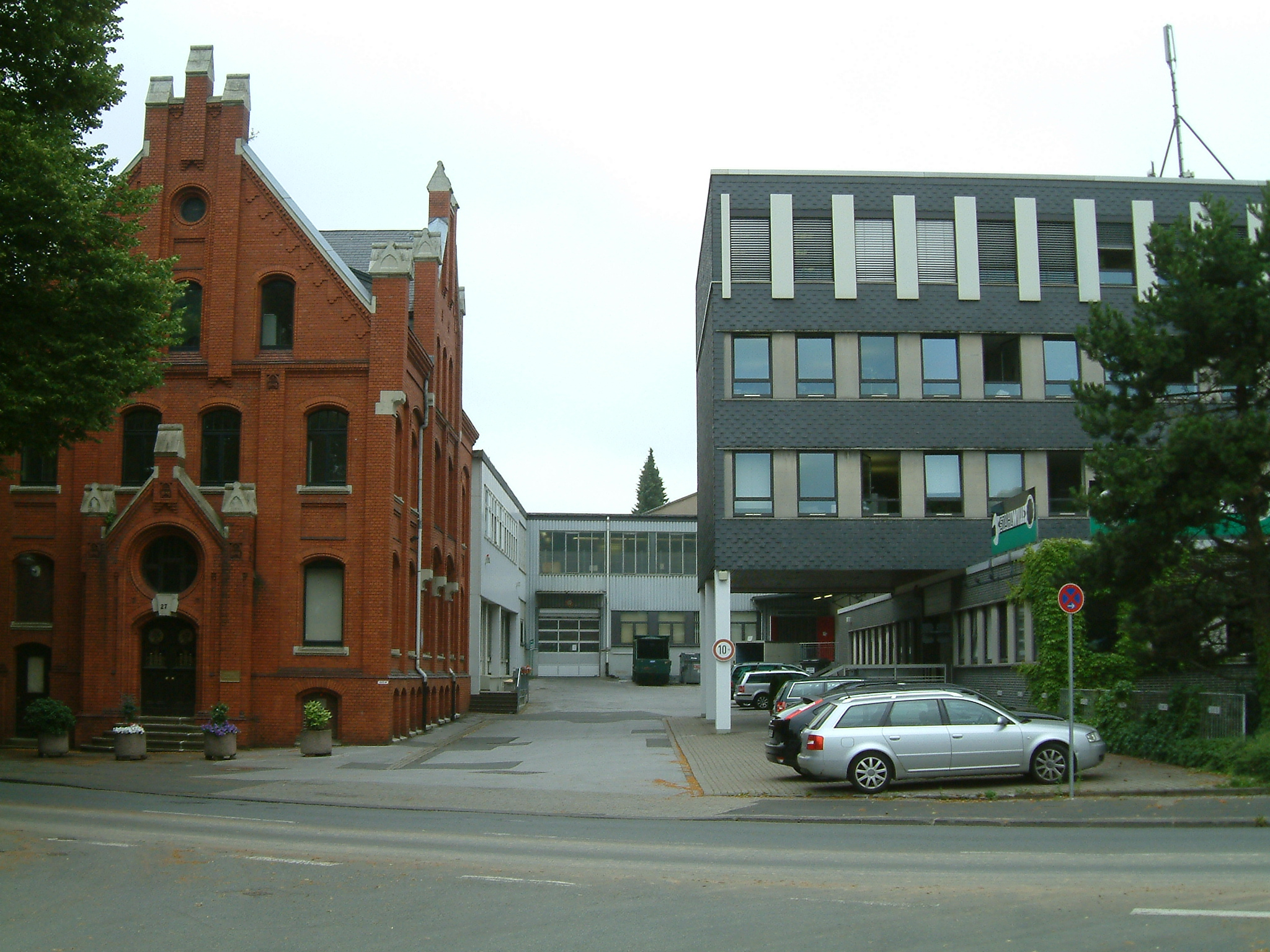
Headquarters of Stahlwille in Wuppertal-Cronenberg

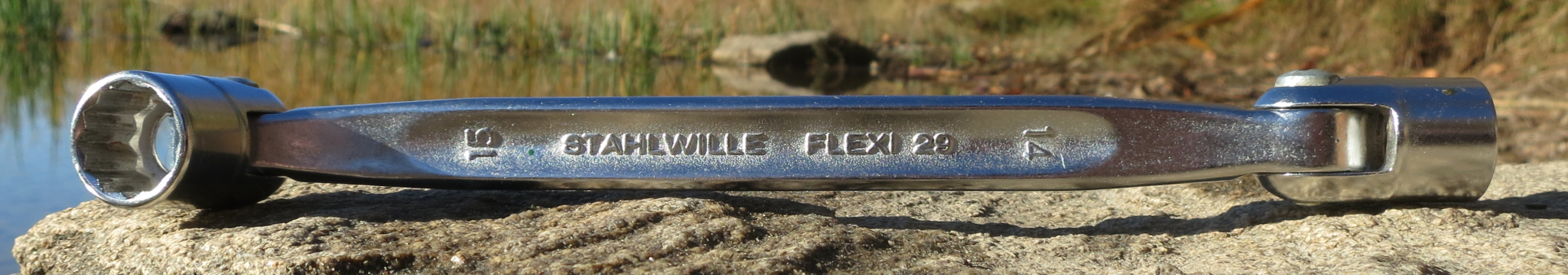
Double-ended flexi-joint spanner by Stahlwille

Stahlwille (officially Stahlwille Holding GmbH & Co. KG, sometimes styled STAHLWILLE) is a German engineering company. It was founded in 1862 by Eduard Wille to manufacture pokers and fire-tongs then specialised in various forged steel tools. Based in the Cronenberg district of Wuppertal, Germany, with several German production plants, Stahlwille manufactures hand tools for automotive, industrial, and aerospace use.

In 2020, the company's products were exported to more than 90 countries. At that time, the product portfolio comprised more than 10,000 tools.

In 2023 Stahlwille had subsidiaries in Europe, the USA, and China.
