= Dolní Rožínka =

- Municipality
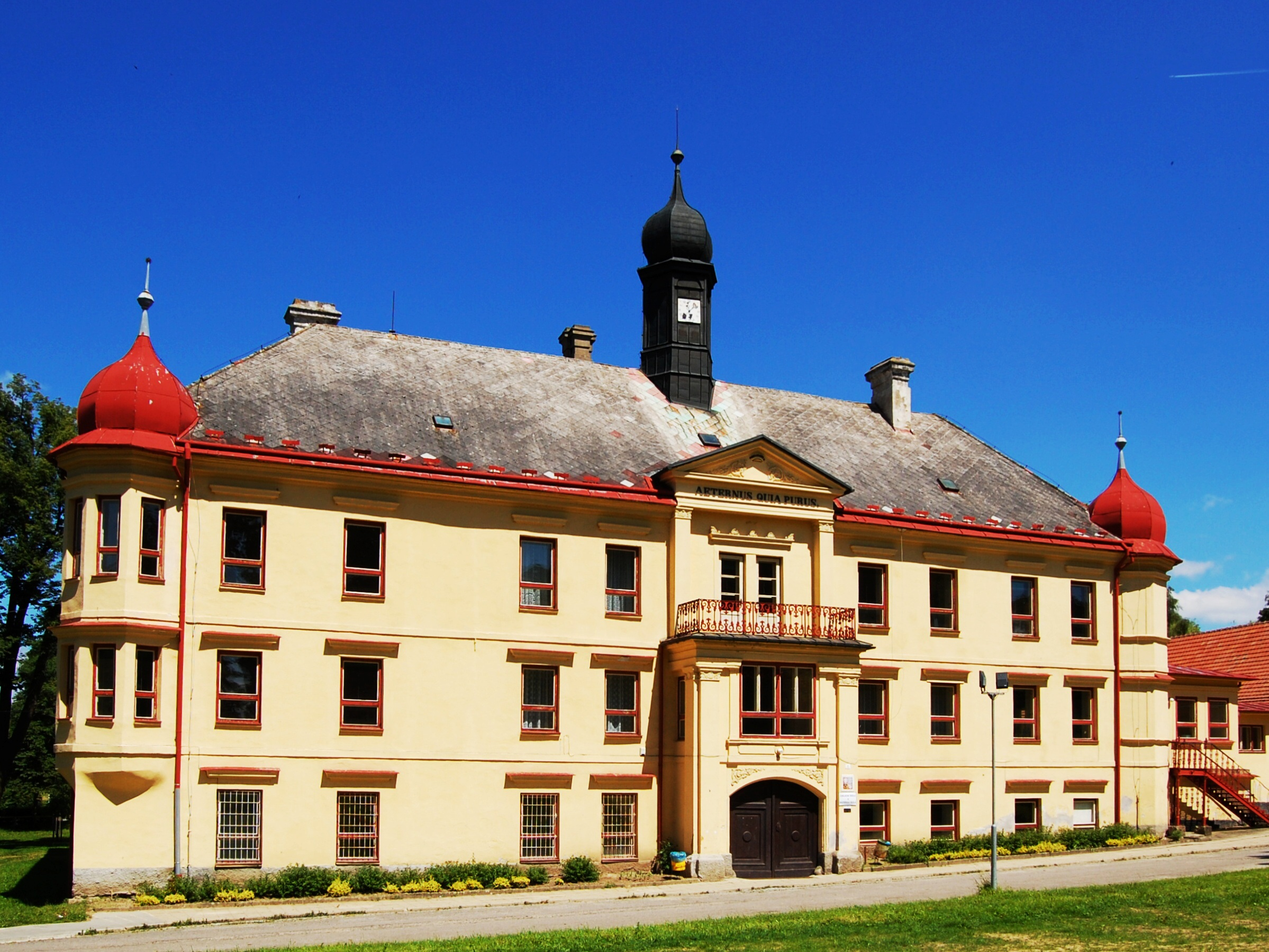
- Dolní Rožínka Castle

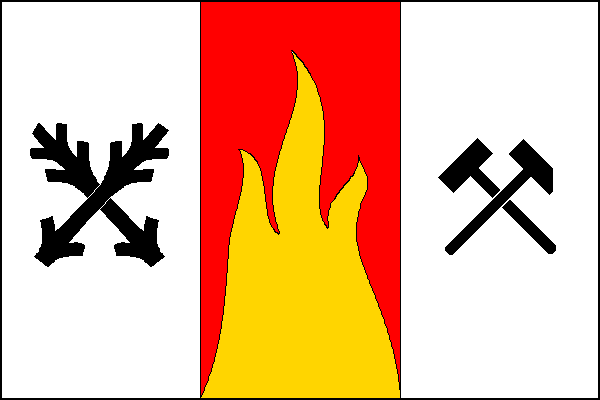
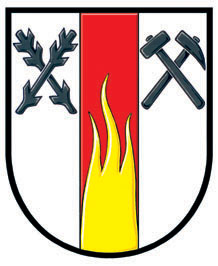
- Flag Coat of arms

- Location in the Czech Republic
- Coordinates: 49°28′37″N 16°12′38″E
- Country: Czech Republic
- Region: Vysočina
- District: Žďár nad Sázavou
- First mentioned: 1353

Area
  - Total: 4.47 km^{2} (1.73 sq mi)
- Elevation: 502 m (1,647 ft)

Population (2026-01-01)
  - Total: 583
  - Density: 130/km^{2} (338/sq mi)
- Time zone: UTC+1 (CET)
  - Summer (DST): UTC+2 (CEST)
- Postal code: 592 51
- Website: www.dolni-rozinka.cz

Dolní Rožínka is a municipality and village in Žďár nad Sázavou District in the Vysočina Region of the Czech Republic. It has about 600 inhabitants.

Dolní Rožínka lies approximately 22 kilometres (14 mi) south-east of Žďár nad Sázavou, 46 kilometres (29 mi) east of Jihlava, and 146 kilometres (91 mi) south-east of Prague.

== Administrative division ==
Dolní Rožínka consists of two municipal parts (in brackets population according to the 2021 census):

- Dolní Rožínka (568)
- Horní Rozsíčka (41)

== Demographics ==
Historical population
Year	Pop.	±%
1869	428	—
1880	505	+18.0%
1890	478	−5.3%
1900	459	−4.0%
1910	389	−15.3%
1921	383	−1.5%
1930	319	−16.7%
1950	310	−2.8%
1961	820	+164.5%
1970	783	−4.5%
1980	742	−5.2%
1991	685	−7.7%
2001	661	−3.5%
2011	629	−4.8%
2021	609	−3.2%
Source: Censuses

== Economy ==
The last uranium mine in the country was located here until 2016, when it was closed.
