= Domanín (Jindřichův Hradec District) =

- Municipality
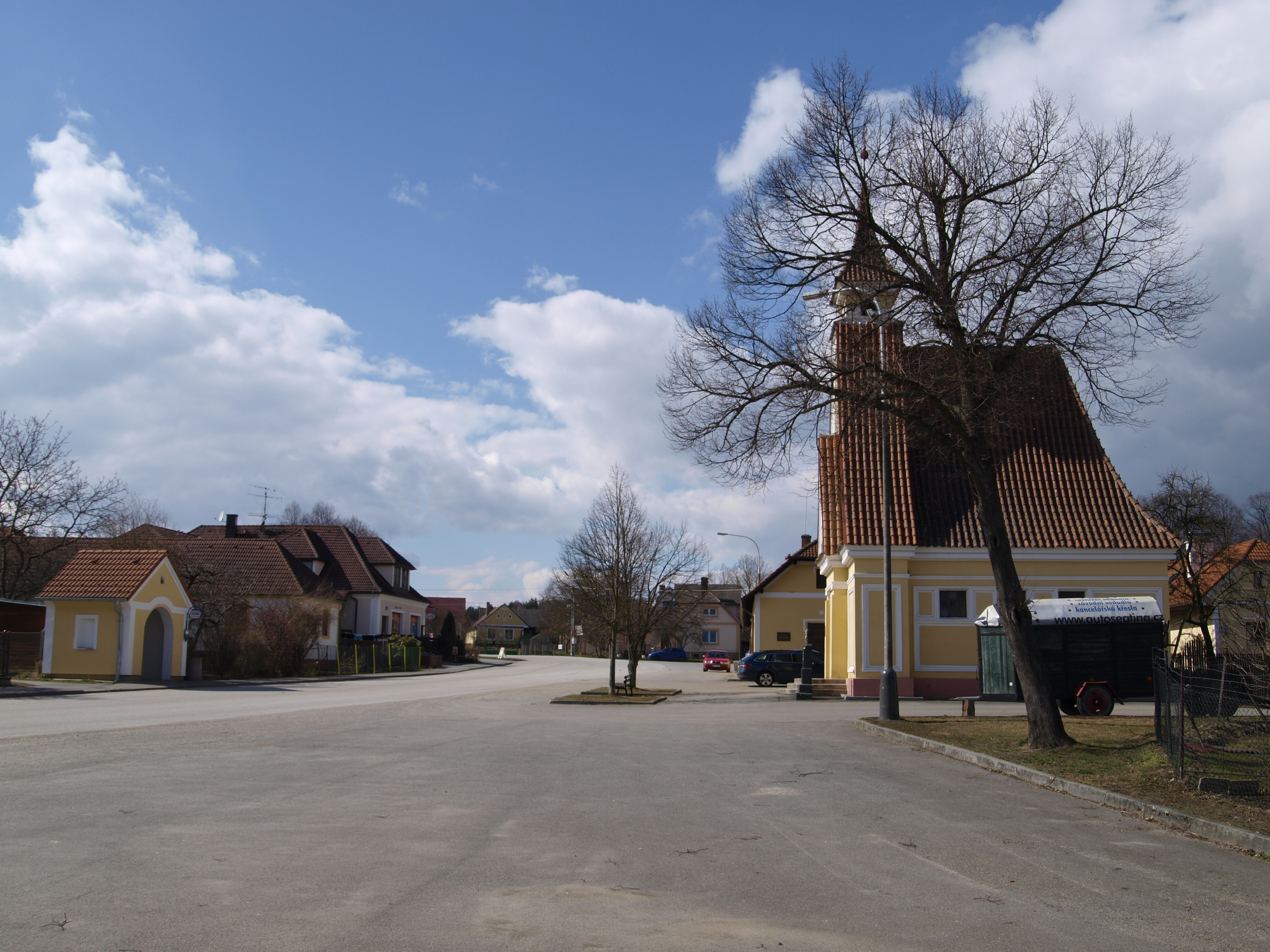
- Centre of Domanín

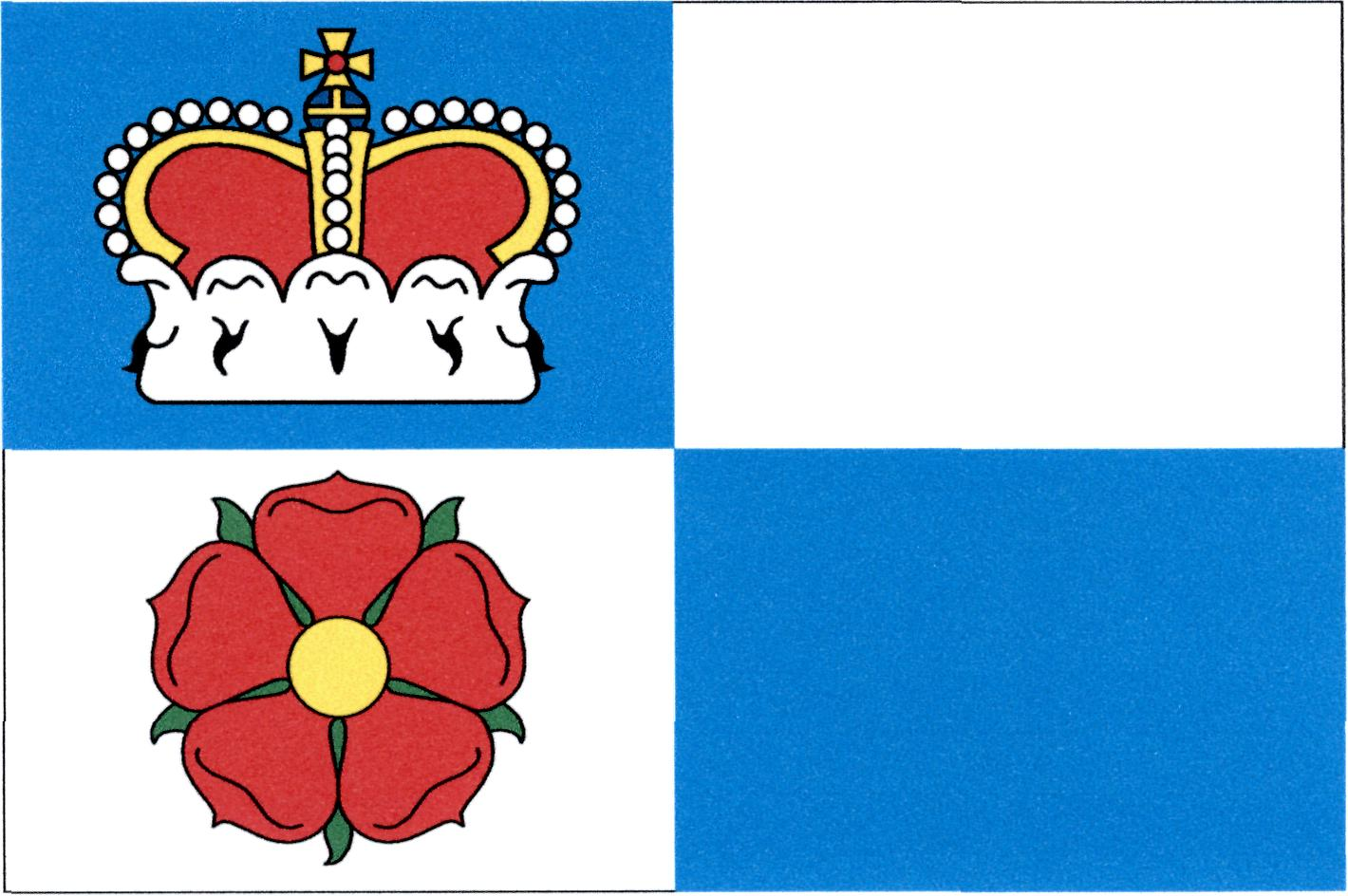
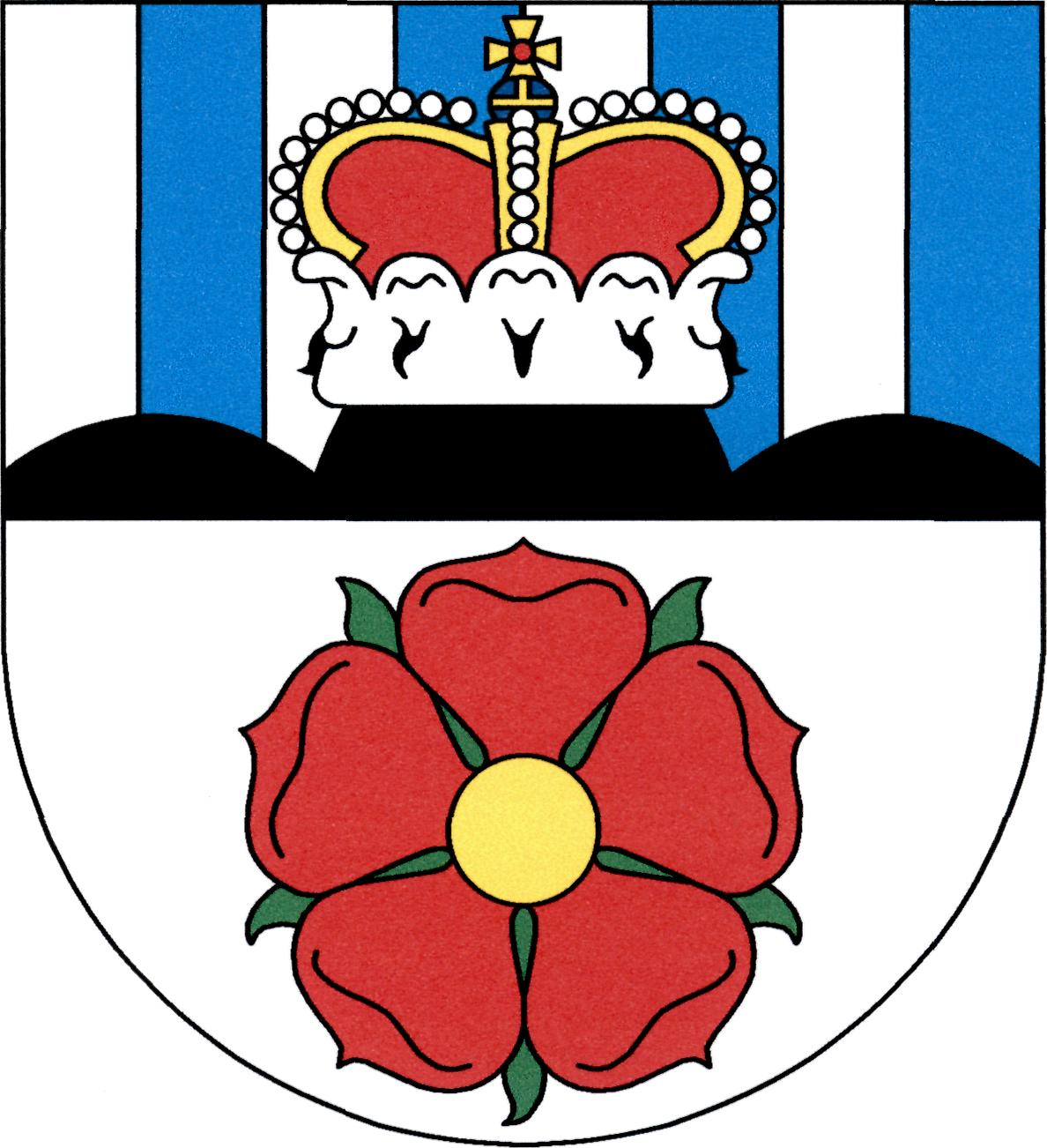
- Flag Coat of arms

- Location in the Czech Republic
- Coordinates: 48°58′18″N 14°44′23″E
- Country: Czech Republic
- Region: South Bohemian
- District: Jindřichův Hradec
- First mentioned: 1367

Area
  - Total: 12.43 km^{2} (4.80 sq mi)
- Elevation: 452 m (1,483 ft)

Population (2026-01-01)
  - Total: 453
  - Density: 36.4/km^{2} (94.4/sq mi)
- Time zone: UTC+1 (CET)
  - Summer (DST): UTC+2 (CEST)
- Postal code: 379 01
- Website: www.obec-domanin.cz

Domanín is a municipality and village in Jindřichův Hradec District in the South Bohemian Region of the Czech Republic. It has about 500 inhabitants.

== Demographics ==
Historical population
| Year | Pop. | ±% |
|---|---|---|
| 1869 | 372 | — |
| 1880 | 351 | −5.6% |
| 1890 | 319 | −9.1% |
| 1900 | 351 | +10.0% |
| 1910 | 382 | +8.8% |
| 1921 | 343 | −10.2% |
| 1930 | 367 | +7.0% |
| 1950 | 282 | −23.2% |
| 1961 | 291 | +3.2% |
| 1970 | 288 | −1.0% |
| 1980 | 272 | −5.6% |
| 1991 | 316 | +16.2% |
| 2001 | 303 | −4.1% |
| 2011 | 372 | +22.8% |
| 2021 | 416 | +11.8% |
Source: Censuses
