= Hazet =

German power tool manufacturer

Hazet-Werk Hermann Zerver GmbH & Co. KG
- Industry: tool manufacturing
- Founded: 1868; 158 years ago
- Founder: Hermann Zerve
- Headquarters: Güldenwerther Bahnhofstraße 25-29, Remscheid, North Rhine-Westphalia, Germany,
- Key people: Matthias J. Hoffmann, CEO; Guido Schmidt, Managing Director
- Revenue: $24.9 mln
- Website: www.hazet.de/en/

Hazet-Werk Hermann Zerver GmbH & Co. KG, commonly known as Hazet, is a German tool & power tool producing company based in Remscheid and operating as a limited liability company ("GmbH") and limited partnership ("KG").

== History ==
Blacksmith Hermann Zerver, son of a blacksmith, began constructing plane irons, saw setters, hinges, and ball locks in the forge he maintained at home, and, in 1874, moved the expanding manufacturing business to a bigger plant, in which he introduced, in 1888, the first heavy-duty reversible ratchet production machinery. (Note: The brand name "Hazet" was derived by the founder from the phonetics of his initials, H & Z, in German.)

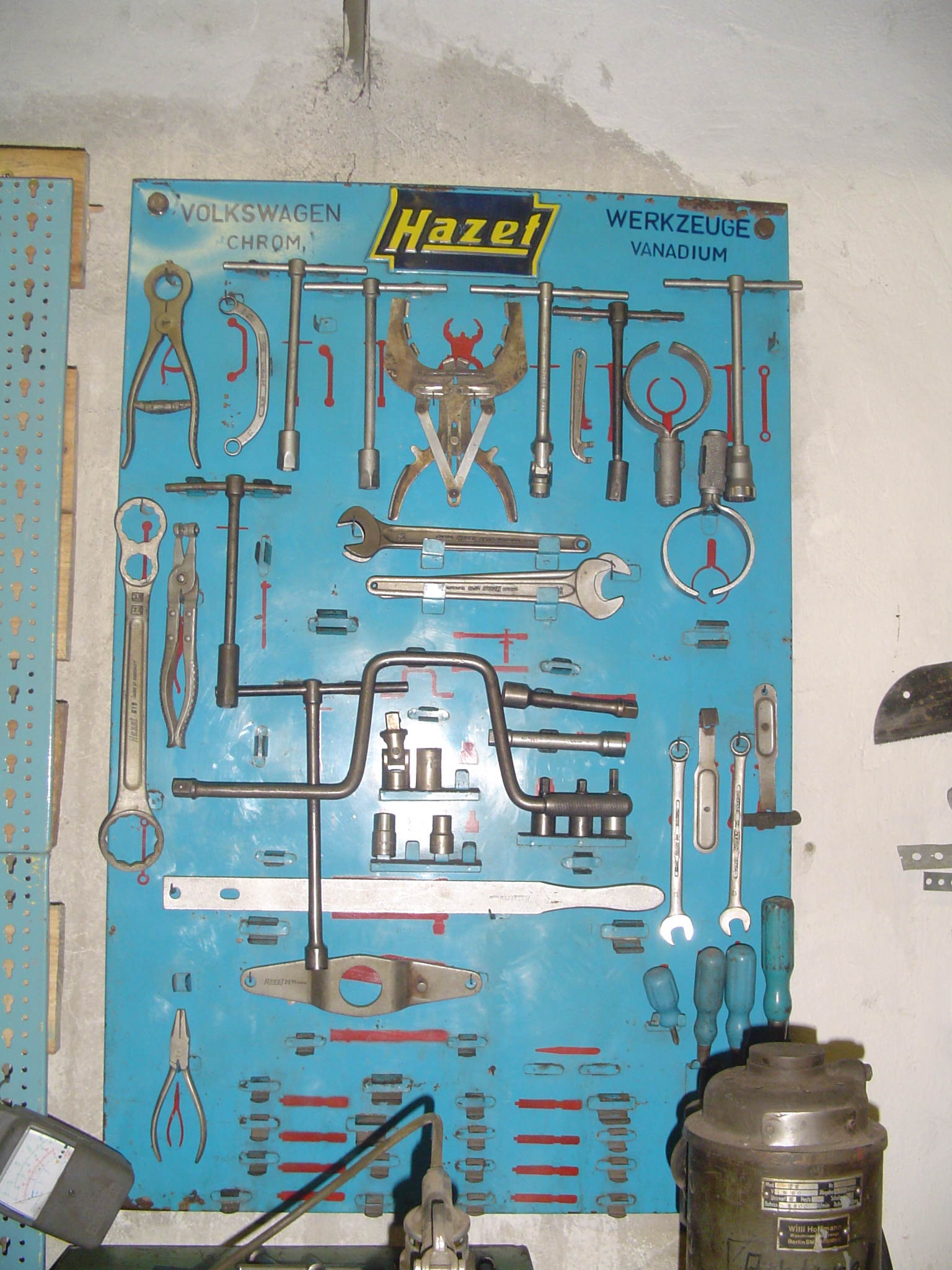
Hazet tool board in repair shop for 1950s Volkswagen Beetles (2006)

In the 21st century, the company's manufacturing range covers some six thousand different tools, including specialty tools for most major car manufacturers, as well as torque tools and tool trolleys under its Assistent brand, all of which are mostly made in Germany.

== Mascots ==
Hazet has used mascots in its advertising promotions sparely, beginning with the 1951 introduction of "Harry," a cartoon caricature of a portly, experienced, older mechanic. The mechanic's appearance changed over the decades, until, in 2005, the human figure was replaced by a robot's, called "Genio".

== Hazet 36 ==
In the 1960s and 70s, during the time of political unrest and violent episodes in Italy, the Hazet 36 wrench (Note: The Hazet 36 wrench still has the same length of 46cm and the weight of almost 1 kilo.) was used as a weapon in marches and protests, mainly by leftist extra-parliamentary groups against the police and neofascist opponents.

== See also ==
- Gedore
- Stahlwille
- Stihl
- Wera Tools
