= Bystřice nad Pernštejnem =

- Town
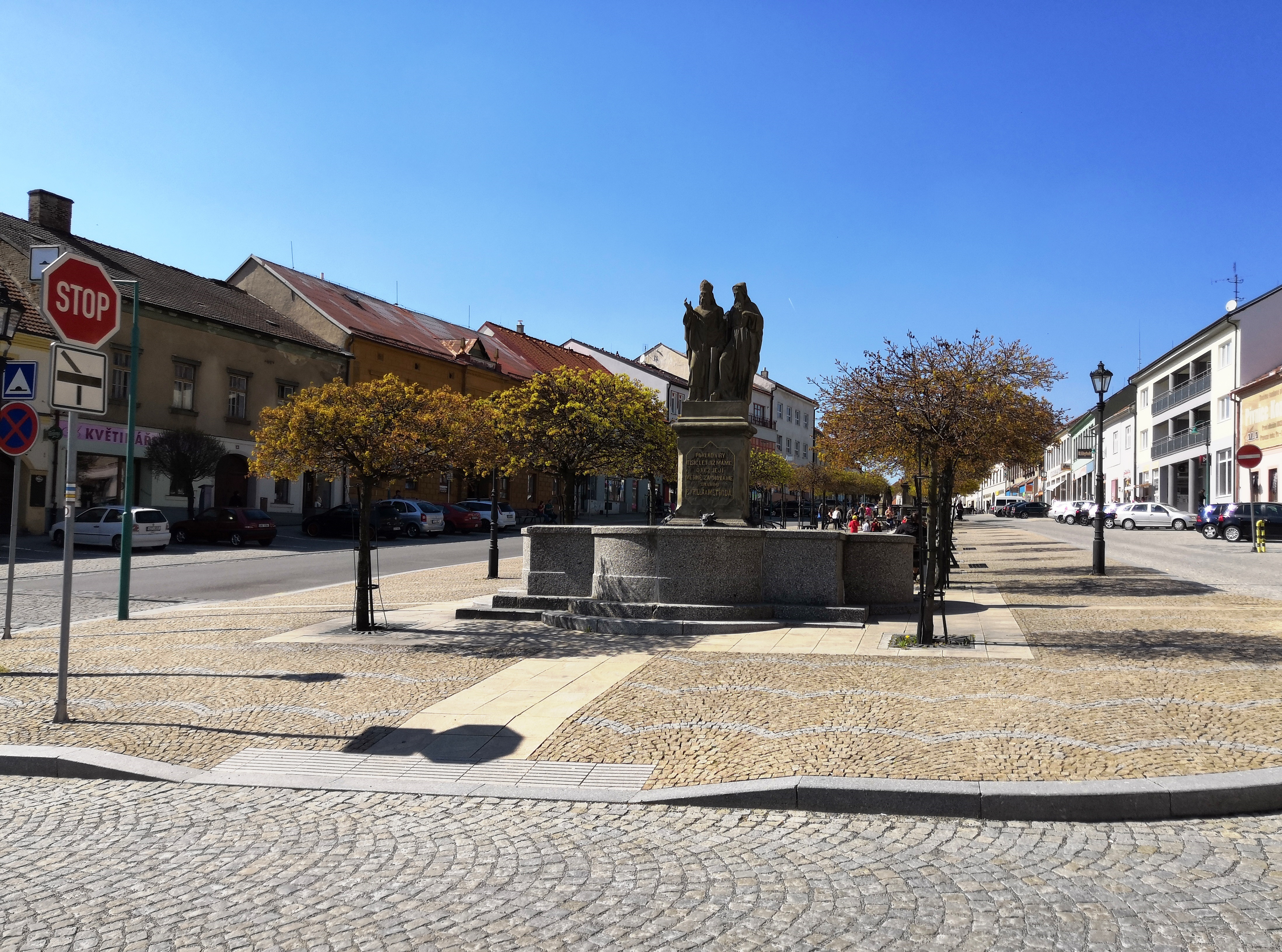
- Upper part of the town square

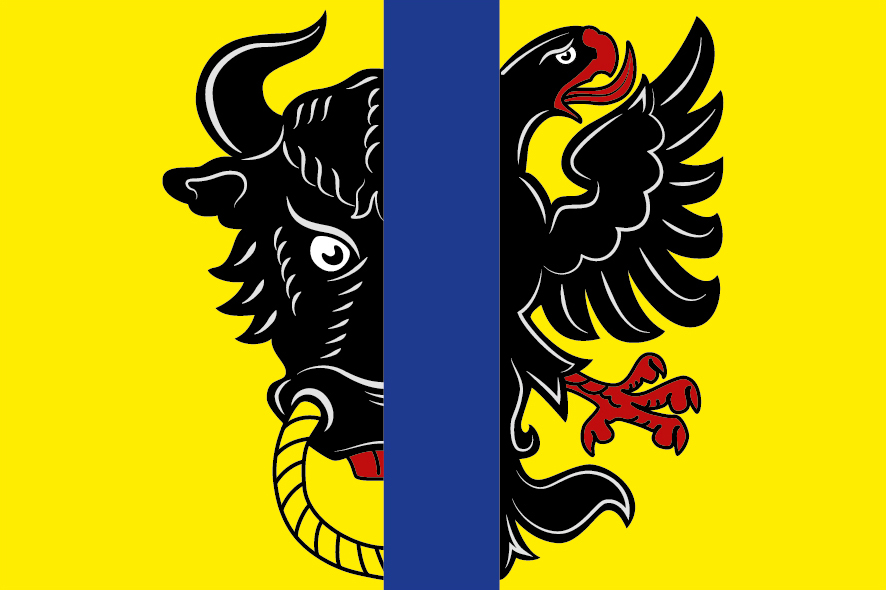
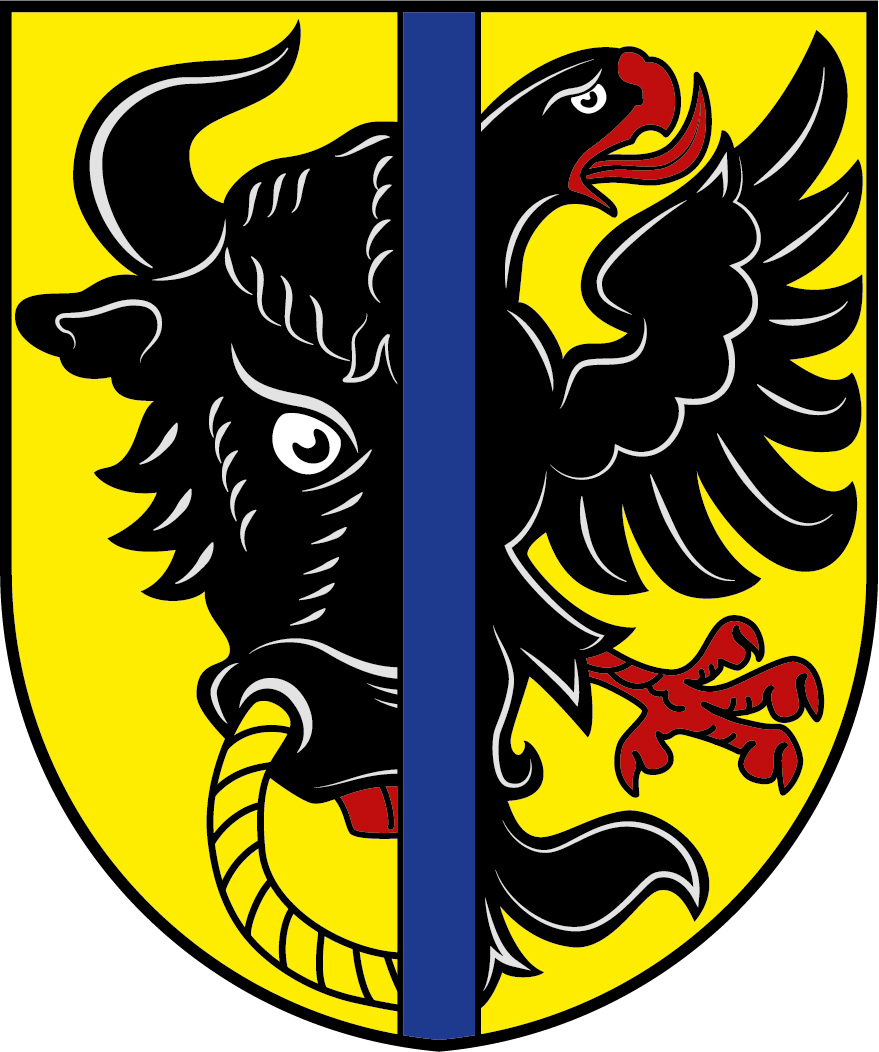
- Flag Coat of arms

- Location in the Czech Republic
- Coordinates: 49°31′23″N 16°15′41″E
- Country: Czech Republic
- Region: Vysočina
- District: Žďár nad Sázavou
- First mentioned: 1298

Government
  - Mayor: Martin Horák

Area
  - Total: 53.07 km^{2} (20.49 sq mi)
- Elevation: 535 m (1,755 ft)

Population (2026-01-01)
  - Total: 7,851
  - Density: 147.9/km^{2} (383.2/sq mi)
- Time zone: UTC+1 (CET)
  - Summer (DST): UTC+2 (CEST)
- Postal code: 593 01
- Website: www.bystricenp.cz

Bystřice nad Pernštejnem (Czech pronunciation: [ˈbɪstr̝̊ɪtsɛ ˈnat pɛrnʃtɛjnɛm]; German: Bistritz ob Pernstein) is a town in Žďár nad Sázavou District in the Vysočina Region of the Czech Republic. It has about 7,900 inhabitants. The town is located on the Bystřice Stream in the Upper Svratka Highlands. The most important monument is the Church of Saint Lawrence.

== Administrative division ==
Bystřice nad Pernštejnem consists of 12 municipal parts (in brackets population according to the 2021 census):

- Bystřice nad Pernštejnem (6,258)
- Bratrušín (81)
- Divišov (62)
- Domanín (293)
- Domanínek (122)
- Dvořiště (78)
- Karasín (97)
- Kozlov (33)
- Lesoňovice (96)
- Pivonice (71)
- Rovné (194)
- Vítochov (107)

== Etymology ==
The name Bystřice is derived from bystřina, which is a term for a steep, fast flowing stream. The local watercourse was originally called Říčka (i.e. 'small river') and later renamed after the town. In 1881, nad Pernštýnem was added to the name to distinguish from other places with the same name, and in 1925 it was modified to nad Pernštejnem. It refers to the nearby Pernštejn Castle.

== Geography ==
Bystřice nad Pernštejnem is located about 23 kilometres (14 mi) east of Žďár nad Sázavou and 41 km (25 mi) northwest of Brno. It lies in the Upper Svratka Highlands. The highest point is the hill Přední skála at 716 m (2,349 ft) above sea level. The Bystřice Stream flows through the town. In the north, the municipal territory borders Vír I Reservoir.

== History ==
The first written mention of Bystřice is from 1238. It was founded by the Lords of Medlov during the colonisation in the 13th century. In the 14th century, it became the administrative, economic and commercial centre of the surrounding villages in the Pernštejn dominion. In 1348, it was first referred to as a market town.

In 1446, Bystřice became a property of the Pernštejn family. During their rule, it gained various privileges and rapidly developed. Bystřice was promoted to a town by Rudolf II in 1580. By this occasion the town received its coat of arms. The owners of the town changed frequently after 1588, when it was sold by Jan V of Pernštejn. The prosperity was interrupted by frequent fires. The most destructive fires occurred in 1585, 1666 and 1841.

In 1905, the town was connected by railway with Žďár nad Sázavou and Tišnov which contributed to development of local industry. The town also benefited from the development of uranium industry in Dolní Rožínka.

The Jewish population disappeared as a result of the Holocaust and it was not renewed after World War II.

== Demographics ==
Historical population

Year	Pop.	±%
1869	5,468	—
1880	5,405	−1.2%
1890	5,119	−5.3%
1900	5,006	−2.2%
1910	4,770	−4.7%

Year	Pop.	±%
1921	4,576	−4.1%
1930	4,170	−8.9%
1950	3,922	−5.9%
1961	5,032	+28.3%
1970	7,644	+51.9%

Year	Pop.	±%
1980	9,510	+24.4%
1991	9,304	−2.2%
2001	9,068	−2.5%
2011	8,279	−8.7%
2021	7,492	−9.5%

Source: Censuses

== Economy ==
The largest employer based in the town is Wera Werk, a manufacturer of tools. It employs more than 1,000 people.

== Transport ==
The I/19 road (the section from Žďár nad Sázavou to Blansko District) passes through the town.

Bystřice nad Pernštejnem is located on the railway line Žďár nad Sázavou–Tišnov.

== Sights ==
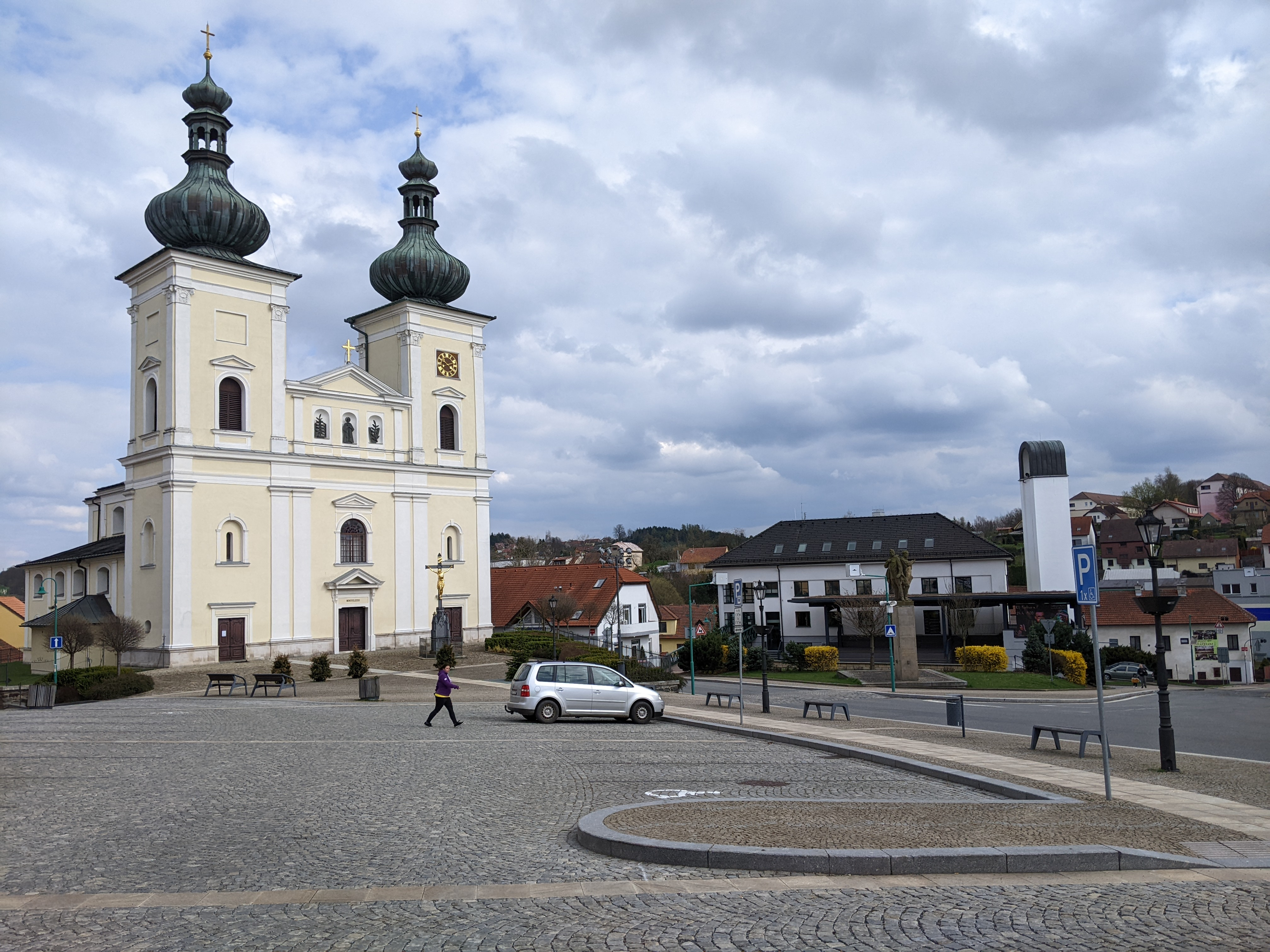
Lower part of the town square with the Church of Saint Lawrence

The Church of Saint Lawrence is as old as the town. Originally it was probably a Romanesque structure, rebuilt in the Gothic style in the 14th century. In the 15th century, it was fortified. Last modifications were made in 1873.

The town hall was first mentioned in 1493. It was rebuilt to its current form in 1808. Today the building houses the town museum.

The Church of the Holy Trinity was built in the late Gothic style in 1613–1615. It is a cemetery church without a tower.

== Notable people ==
- Gustav Pfleger Moravský (1833–1875), writer and poet
- Otto Eisler (1893–1968), architect

== Twin towns – sister cities ==
Bystřice nad Pernštejnem is twinned with:

- Boguchwała, Poland
- Crimmitschau, Germany
- Trostyanets, Ukraine
- Vranov nad Topľou, Slovakia
