= Domanin, Kępno County =

Domanin
- Village
- Location within Poland
- Coordinates: 51°21′N 18°1′E
- Country: Poland
- Voivodeship: Greater Poland
- County: Kępno
- Gmina: Kępno
- Population: 300

Domanin [dɔˈmanin] is a village in the administrative district of Gmina Kępno, within Kępno County, Greater Poland Voivodeship, in west-central Poland.
