= Cronenberg, Wuppertal =

Coordinates: 51°12′N 7°08′E

Cronenberg was formerly an independent German town in the Rhine Province.

== History ==
Cronenberg was first mentioned in 1050 as a part of the Werden-Abbey. Later on, its name changed from Croyaberge to Cromberg and the administrative structures changed as well. In 1453 the name Cronenberg was used for a village with a viable marketplace. Since 1929 it is a part of Wuppertal.

== Geography ==
Neighboured quarters from west to east: Vohwinkel, Elberfeld and Ronsdorf. The southwestern border is built up by the river Wupper and the city of Solingen. The southeastern neighbour is Remscheid.

== Economy ==
For many centuries, it has been a centre for the metalworking industry, especially with many factories for hand tools. The waterpowered Manuelskotten is still in use as a museum for industrial history.

The plier-company Knipex has its headquarters in Cronenberg.

== Demography ==
Its population is around 22,000 today.

== Sports ==
Cronenberg is home of several sport clubs.

The most-important club is RSC Cronenberg, the a multiple and as well the current German male Roller Hockey Champion. The female team, known as Dörper Cats, is as well a successful team. Different male and female national players take part of the squads.

Cronenberger SC and SSV 07 Sudberg are both popular football-clubs. Cronenberger SC, usually called CSC, is situated close to the local centre, SSV 07 Sudberg is based in the outskirts.

Cronenberger TG is the local handball club, which offers as well table-tennis and gymnastics.
