= St. John the Baptist's Church, Wędrynia =

Coordinates: 50.5156°N 18.1848°E

St. John the Baptist's Church
- Kościół św. Jana Chrzciciela w Wędryni
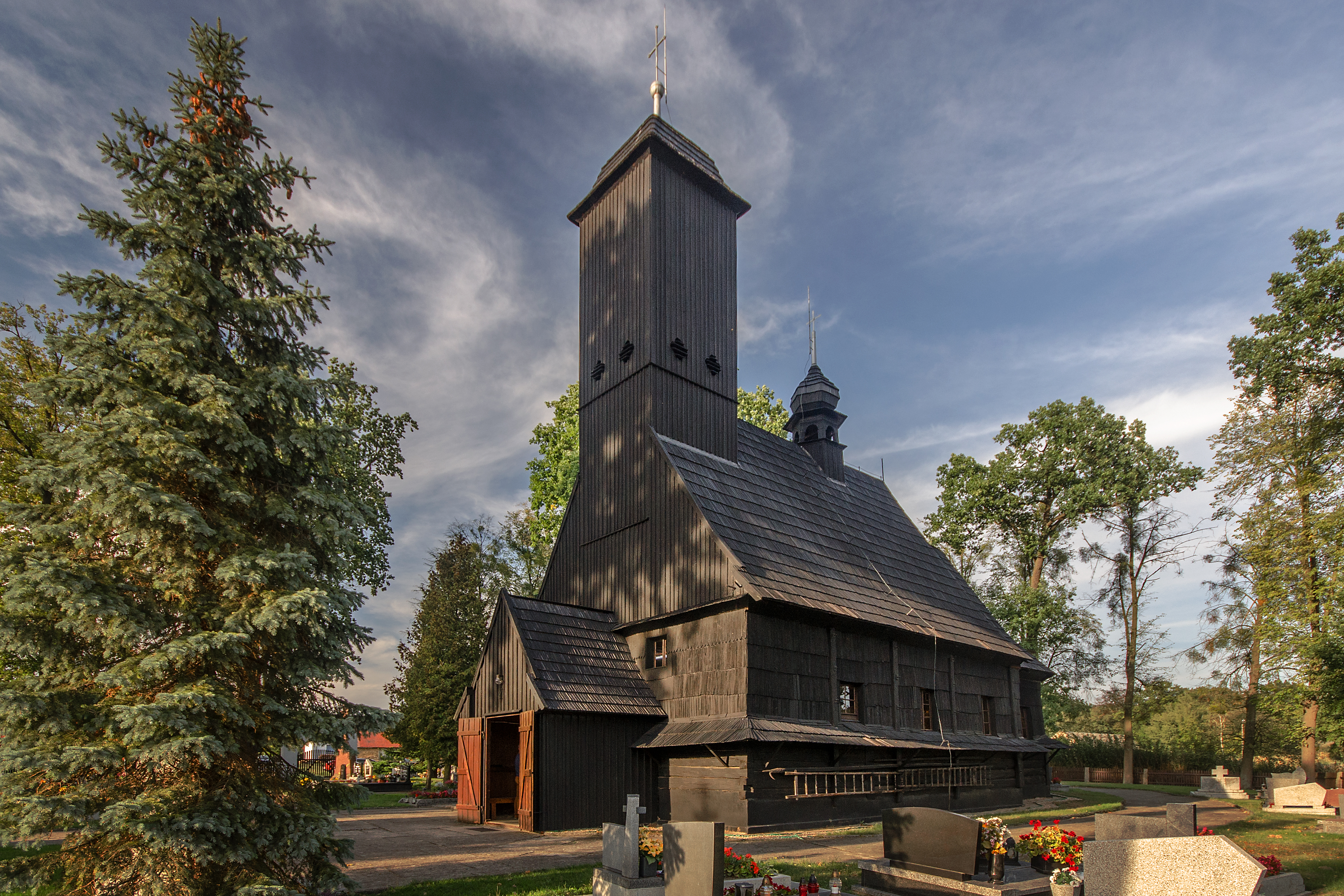
- St. John the Baptist's Church
- St. John the Baptist's Church
- Location: Wędrynia
- Country: Poland
- Denomination: Roman Catholic

Architecture
- Completed: 1791

Specifications
- Materials: Wood

Administration
- Diocese: Roman Catholic Diocese of Opole
- Parish: Parafia Najświętszego Serca Pana Jezusa w Chudobie

St. John the Baptist's Church is a wooden chapel of ease located in Wędrynia, Kluczbork County in Poland.

The church was built in 1791, with the tower added 1818. It was renovated in 1959. The structure is based on log house, with a tri-point closed-off chancel, built in the Baroque architectural style. The narrow-sided tower dates from 1818, and the ridge turret is topped with a gourd-like apex. Inside, the church houses a late-Baroque main altar with statues of two bishop saints and paintings of Saints Augustine of Hippo or Zechariah and St. John the Baptist.
