= Biadacz =

Biadacz refers to the following places in Poland:

- Biadacz, Kluczbork County
- Biadacz, Opole County
