= Konrad Kornek =

Polish footballer (1937–2021)

Personal information
- Full name: Konrad Józef Kornek
- Date of birth: 12 February 1937
- Place of birth: Luboszyce, Poland
- Date of death: 6 March 2021 (aged 84)
- Place of death: Dormagen, Germany
- Height: 1.75 m (5 ft 9 in)
- Position: Goalkeeper

Senior career*
Years	Team	Apps	(Gls)
- LZS Krzanowice
1954–1959	Budowlani Opole	24	(0)
1959–1961	Legia Warsaw	12	(0)
1961–1969	Odra Opole	161	(0)
1969–1971	Polonia NY SC		
1971	New York Cosmos	14	(0)

International career
1962–1967	Poland	15	(0)
- * Club domestic league appearances and goals

Konrad Kornek (12 February 1937 – 6 March 2021) was a Polish footballer who played as a goalkeeper. He made 15 appearances for the Poland national team from 1962 to 1967. At club level, he was best known for his time at Legia Warsaw, and his local professional club Odra Opole, amassing 197 matches in the top division between the two.
