= Gmina Łubniany =

Gmina Łubniany Gemeinde Lugnian Łubniany Commune
- Gmina
- Flag Coat of arms
- Interactive map of Gmina Łubniany; Gemeinde Lugnian
- Coordinates (Łubniany): 50°47′N 18°0′E
- Country: Poland
- Voivodeship: Opole
- County: Opole
- Seat: Łubniany

Area
  - Total: 125.41 km^{2} (48.42 sq mi)

Population (2019-06-30)
  - Total: 9,830
  - Density: 78.4/km^{2} (203/sq mi)
- Time zone: UTC+1 (CET)
  - Summer (DST): UTC+2 (CEST)
- Vehicle registration: OPO
- Website: http://www.lubniany.pl

Gmina Łubniany (German: Gemeinde Lugnian) is a rural gmina (administrative district) in Opole County, Opole Voivodeship, in south-western Poland. Its seat is the village of Łubniany, which lies approximately 14 kilometres (9 mi) north of the regional capital Opole.

The gmina covers an area of 125.41 square kilometres (48.42 sq mi), and ss of 2019 its total population is 9,830. Since 2010 the village, like much of the area, has been officially bilingual in Polish and German.

The gmina contains part of the protected area called Stobrawa Landscape Park.

== Villages ==
Gmina Łubniany contains the villages and settlements of:

- Łubniany
- Biadacz
- Brynica
- Dąbrówka Łubniańska
- Grabie
- Jełowa
- Kępa
- Kobylno
- Kolanowice
- Luboszyce
- Masów

== Neighbouring gminas ==
Gmina Łubniany is bordered by the city of Opole and by the gminas of Dobrzeń Wielki, Lasowice Wielkie, Murów and Turawa.

== Twin towns – sister cities ==
Gmina Łubniany is twinned with:

- Arnstein, Germany
