= Jasienie =

- Village
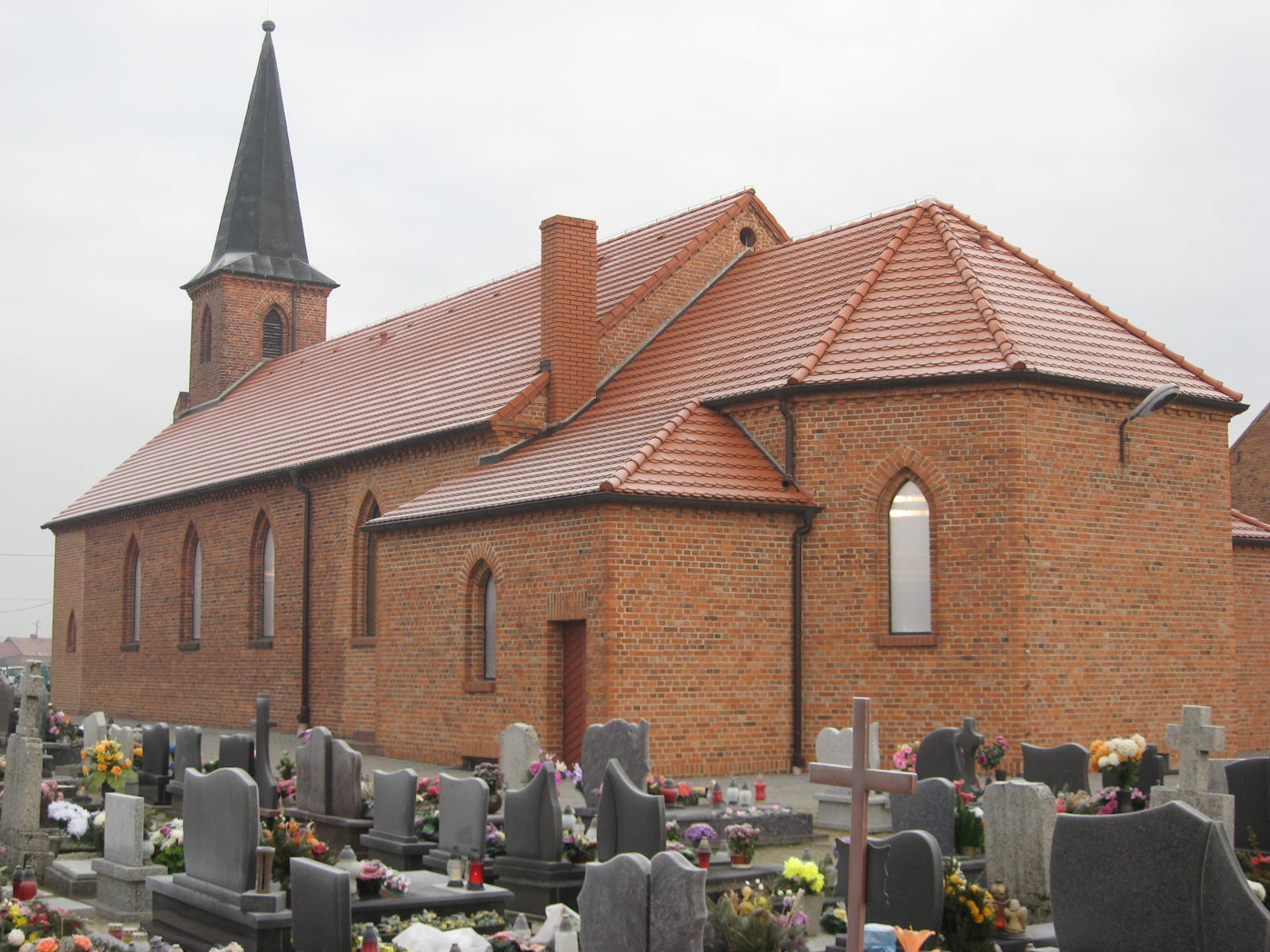
- Catholic church

- Location within Poland
- Coordinates: 50°54′N 18°13′E
- Country: Poland
- Voivodeship: Opole
- County: Kluczbork
- Gmina: Lasowice Wielkie

Population
  - Total: 873
- Time zone: UTC+1 (CET)
  - Summer (DST): UTC+2 (CEST)
- Vehicle registration: OKL

Jasienie [jaˈɕɛɲɛ] is a village in the administrative district of Gmina Lasowice Wielkie, within Kluczbork County, Opole Voivodeship, in southern Poland.

== History ==
Two Polish citizens were murdered by Nazi Germany in the village during World War II.
