= Laskowice, Kluczbork County =

Laskowice
- Village
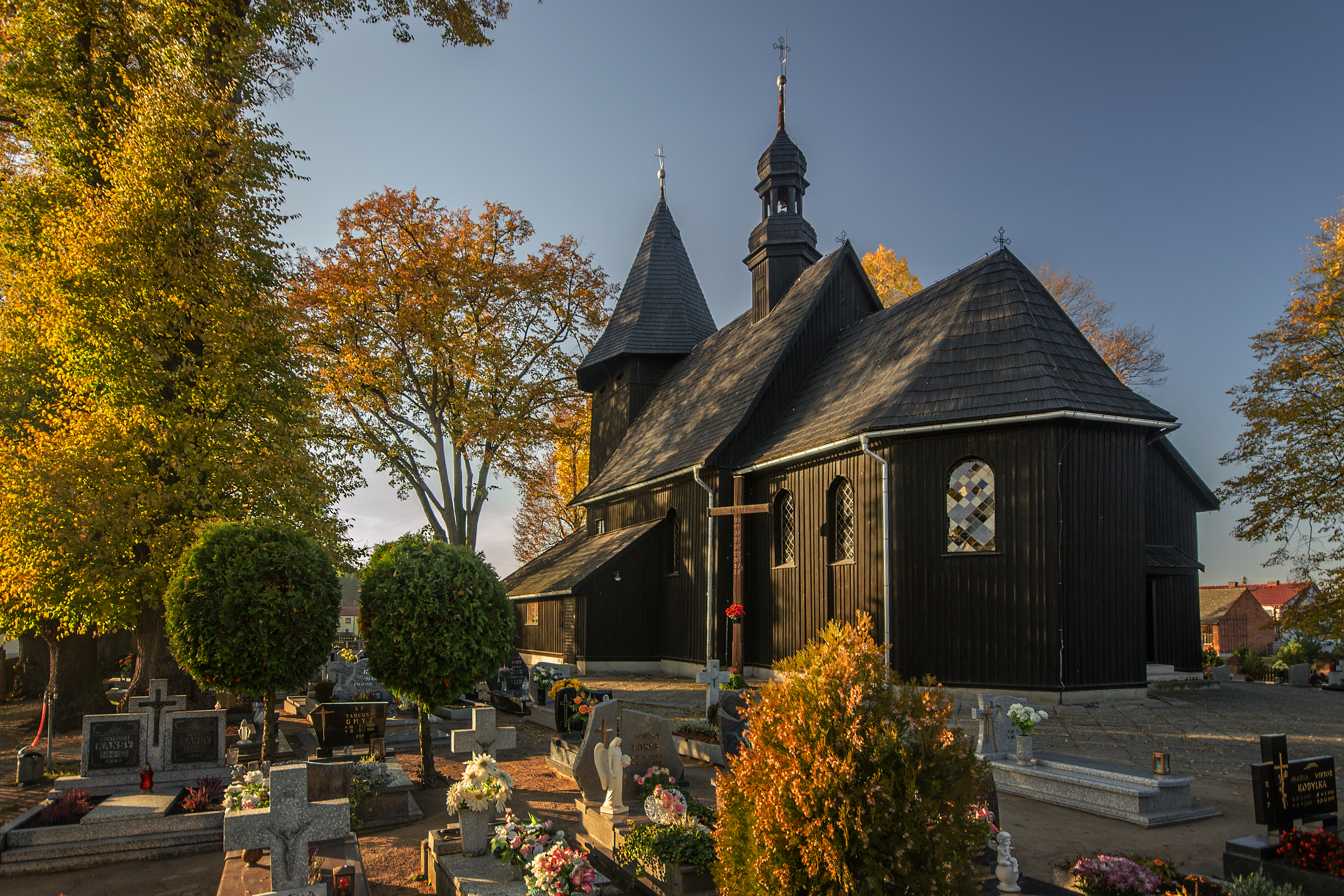
- Catholic church

- Location within Poland
- Coordinates: 50°50′N 18°7′E
- Country: Poland
- Voivodeship: Opole
- County: Kluczbork
- Gmina: Lasowice Wielkie
- Population: 980

Laskowice [laskɔˈvit͡sɛ] is a village in the administrative district of Gmina Lasowice Wielkie, within Kluczbork County, Opole Voivodeship, in south-western Poland.

== See also ==
- St. Lawrence's Church, Laskowice
