= Grabie, Opole Voivodeship =

Grabie Heinrichsfelde
- Village
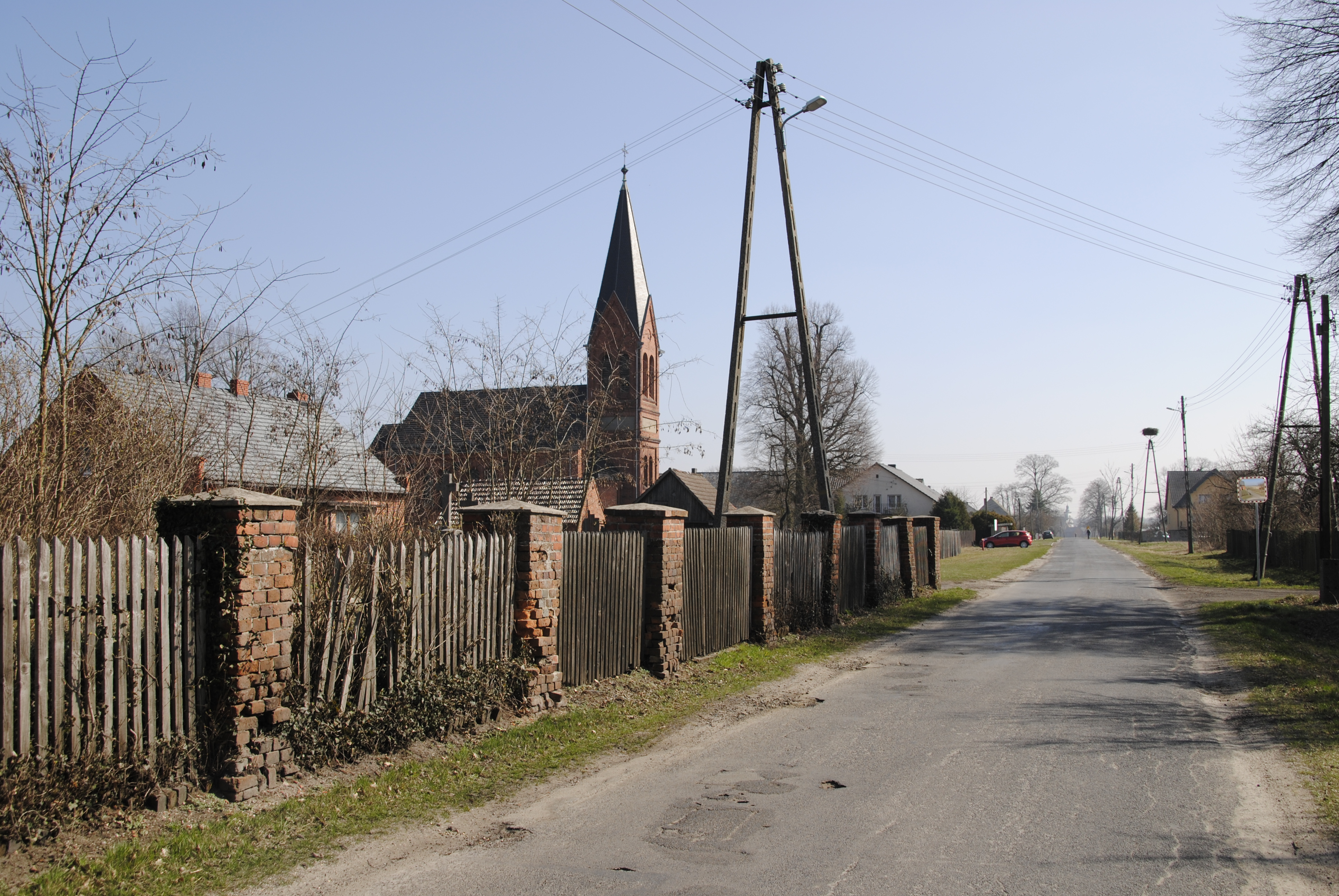

- Location within Poland
- Coordinates: 50°47′57″N 18°5′14″E
- Country: Poland
- Voivodeship: Opole
- County: Opole
- Gmina: Łubniany
- Postal code: 46-024

Grabie ([ˈɡrabjɛ], additional name in German: Heinrichsfelde) is a village in the administrative district of Gmina Łubniany, within Opole County, Opole Voivodeship, in south-western Poland.
