= Jełowa =

Jełowa Jellowa
- Village
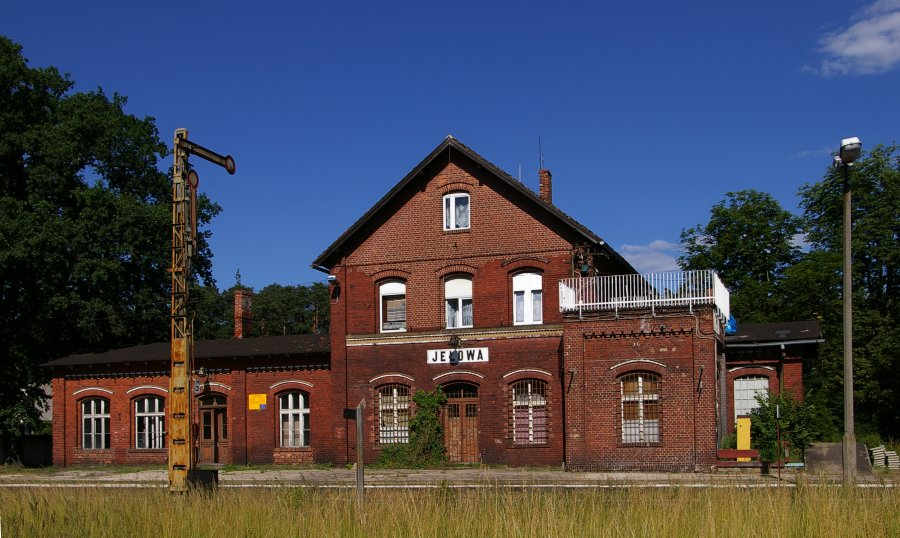
- Train station

- Location within Poland
- Coordinates: 50°48′N 18°5′E
- Country: Poland
- Voivodeship: Opole
- County: Opole
- Gmina: Łubniany
- Postal code: 46-024

Jełowa ([jɛˈwɔva], additional name in German: Jellowa) is a village in the administrative district of Gmina Łubniany, within Opole County, Opole Voivodeship, in south-western Poland.
