= Chocianowice =

- Village
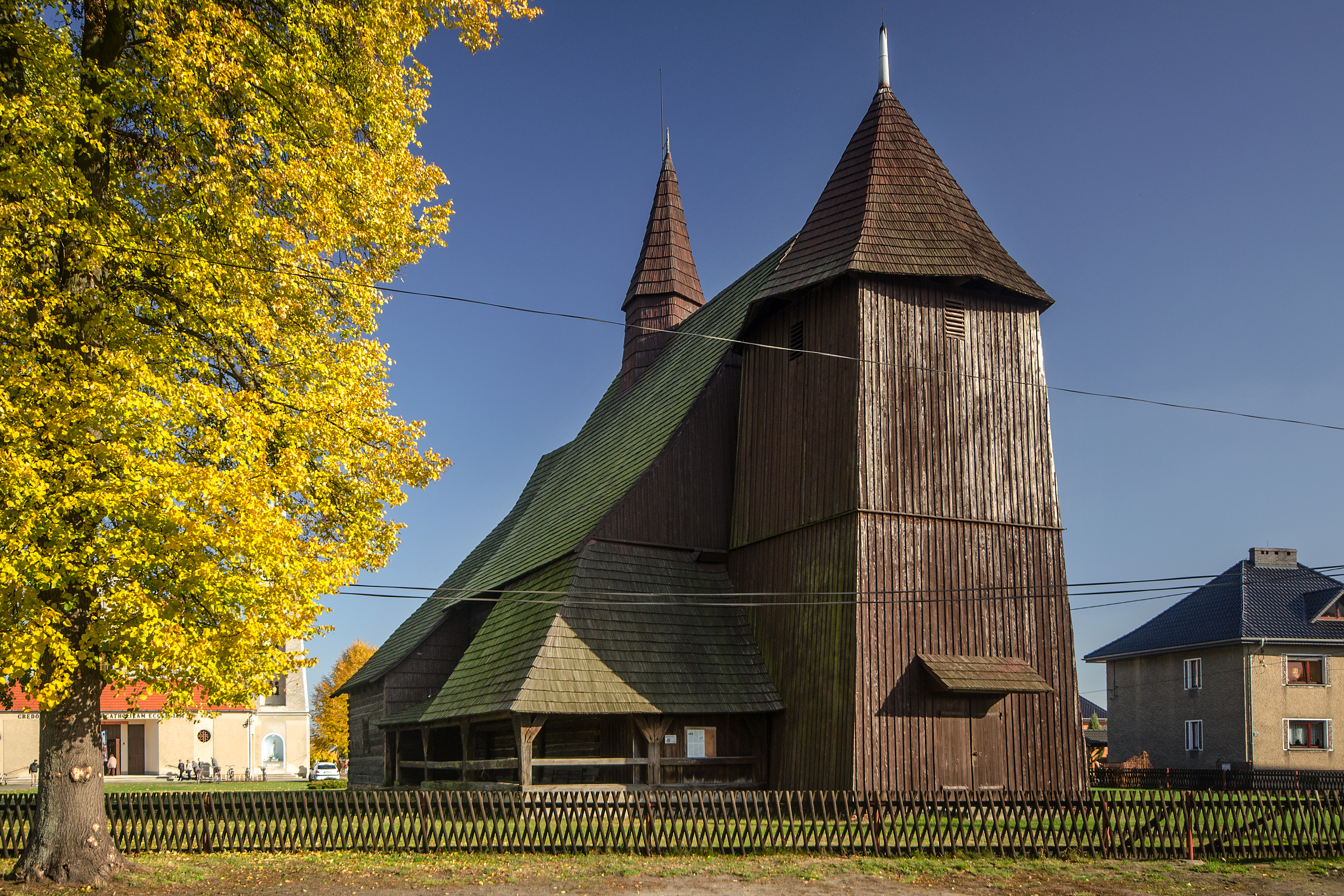
- Church of the Nativity of the Virgin Mary

- Location within Poland
- Coordinates: 50°56′N 18°17′E
- Country: Poland
- Voivodeship: Opole
- County: Kluczbork
- Gmina: Lasowice Wielkie

Population
  - Total: 1,170

Chocianowice [xɔt͡ɕanɔˈvit͡sɛ] is a village in the administrative district of Gmina Lasowice Wielkie, within Kluczbork County, Opole Voivodeship, in south-western Poland.
