= Kolanowice =

Kolanowice Kollanowitz
- Village
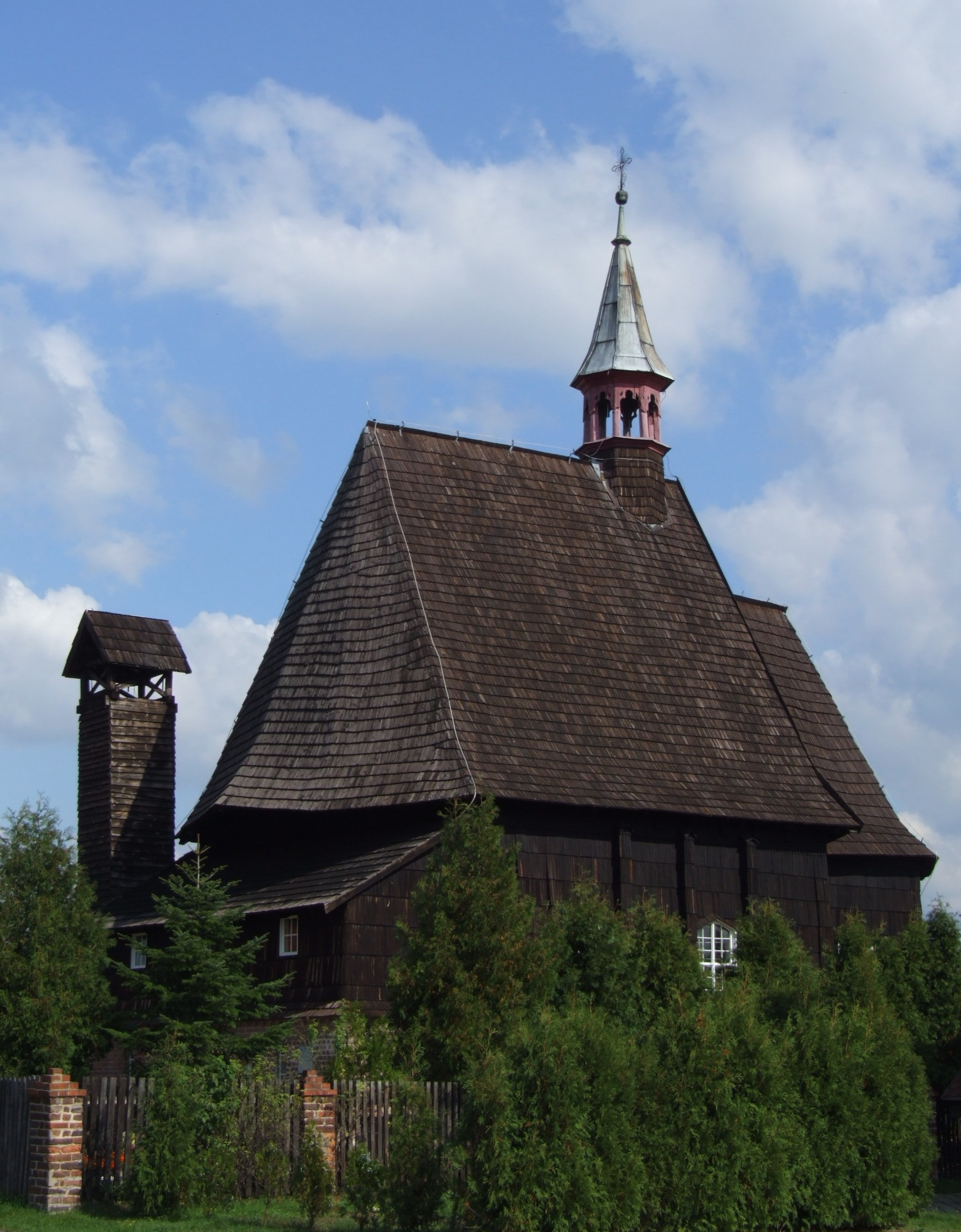
- Wooden church in Kolanowice

- Location within Poland
- Coordinates: 50°44′33″N 17°59′23″E
- Country: Poland
- Voivodeship: Opole
- County: Opole
- Gmina: Łubniany

Population (approx.)
  - Total: 500
- Postal code: 46-024

Kolanowice ([kɔlanɔˈvit͡sɛ], additional name in German: Kollanowitz) is a village in the administrative district of Gmina Łubniany, within Opole County, Opole Voivodeship, in south-western Poland.
