= Brynica, Gmina Łubniany =

Brynica Brinnitz
- Village
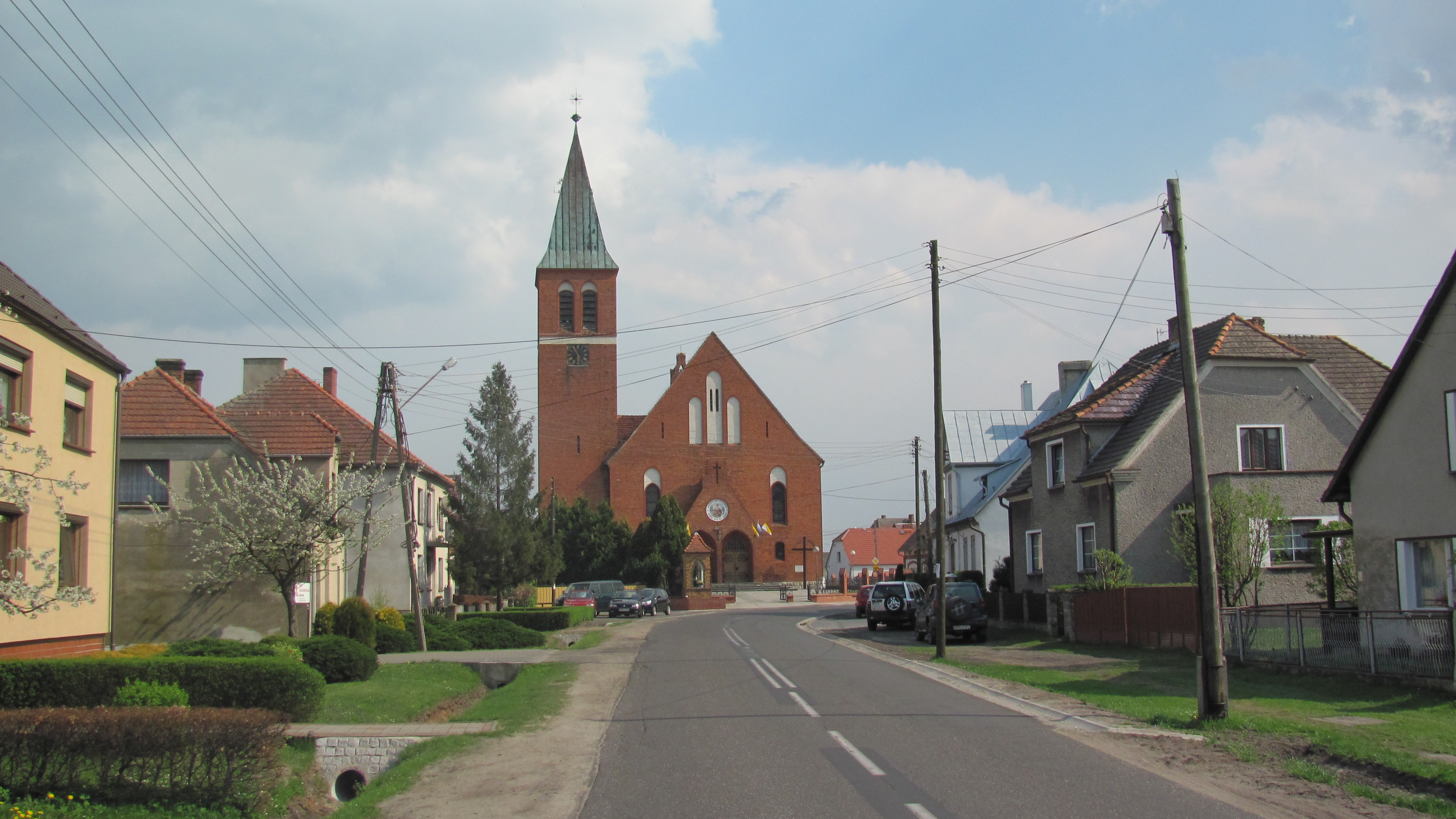

- Location within Poland
- Coordinates: 50°50′00″N 17°40′00″E
- Country: Poland
- Voivodeship: Opole
- County: Opole
- Gmina: Łubniany

Population
  - Total: 1,200
- Postal code: 46-024

Brynica ([brɨˈnit͡sa], additional name in German: Brinnitz) is a village in the administrative district of Gmina Łubniany, within Opole County, Opole Voivodeship, in south-western Poland.
