= Łubniany =

Łubniany Lugnian
- Village
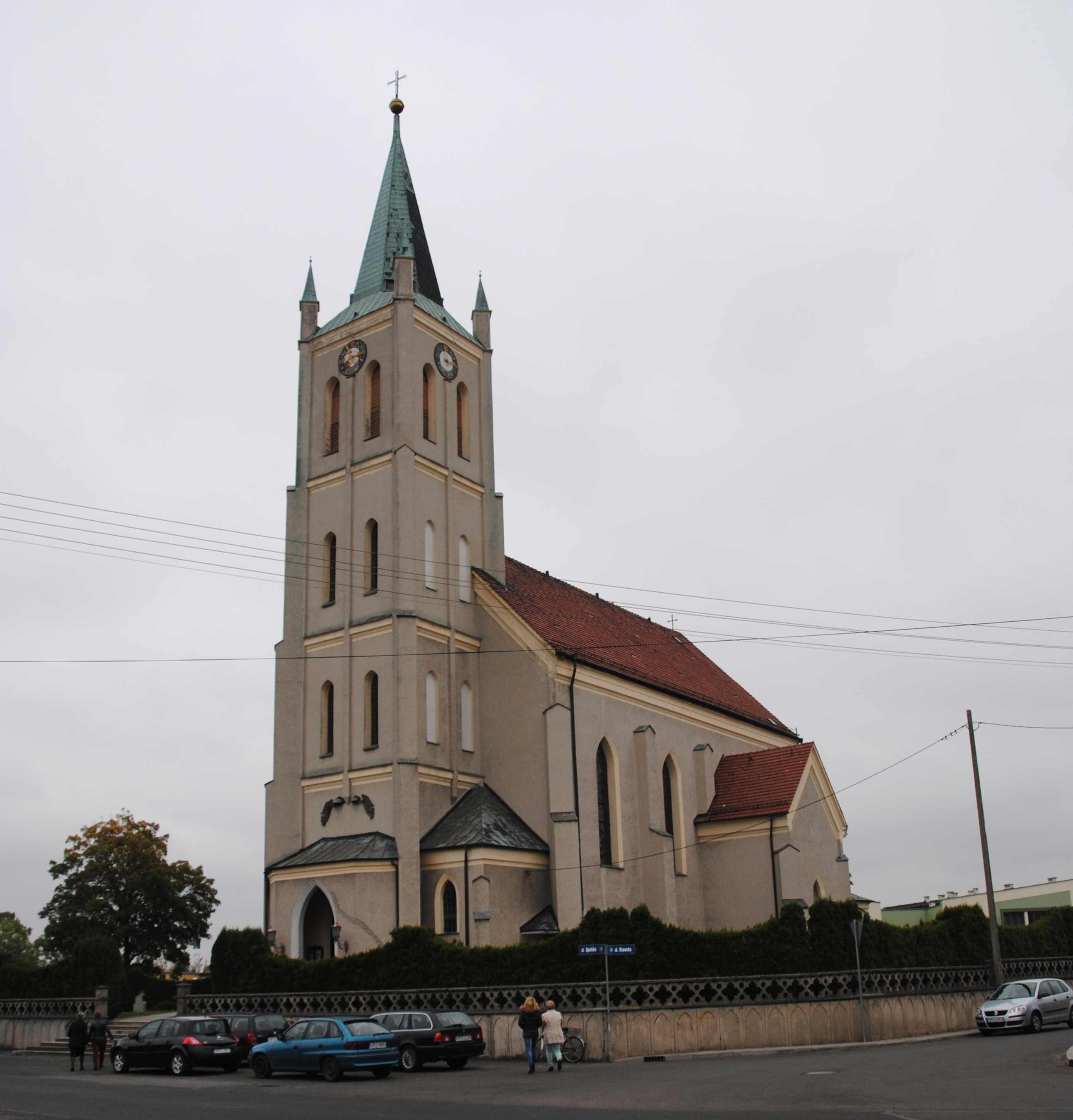
- Church of Saints Peter and Paul

- Location within Poland
- Coordinates: 50°47′N 18°0′E
- Country: Poland
- Voivodeship: Opole
- County: Opole
- Gmina: Łubniany
- Postal code: 46-024

Łubniany ([wubˈɲanɨ], additional name in German: Lugnian) is a village in Opole County, Opole Voivodeship, in southern Poland. It is the seat of the gmina (administrative district) called Gmina Łubniany.

== International relations ==
=== Twin towns – Sister cities ===
Łubniany is twinned with:

- Arnstein, Germany (since 22 May 1993)
