= Lasowice Wielkie, Opole Voivodeship =

Lasowice Wielkie
- Village
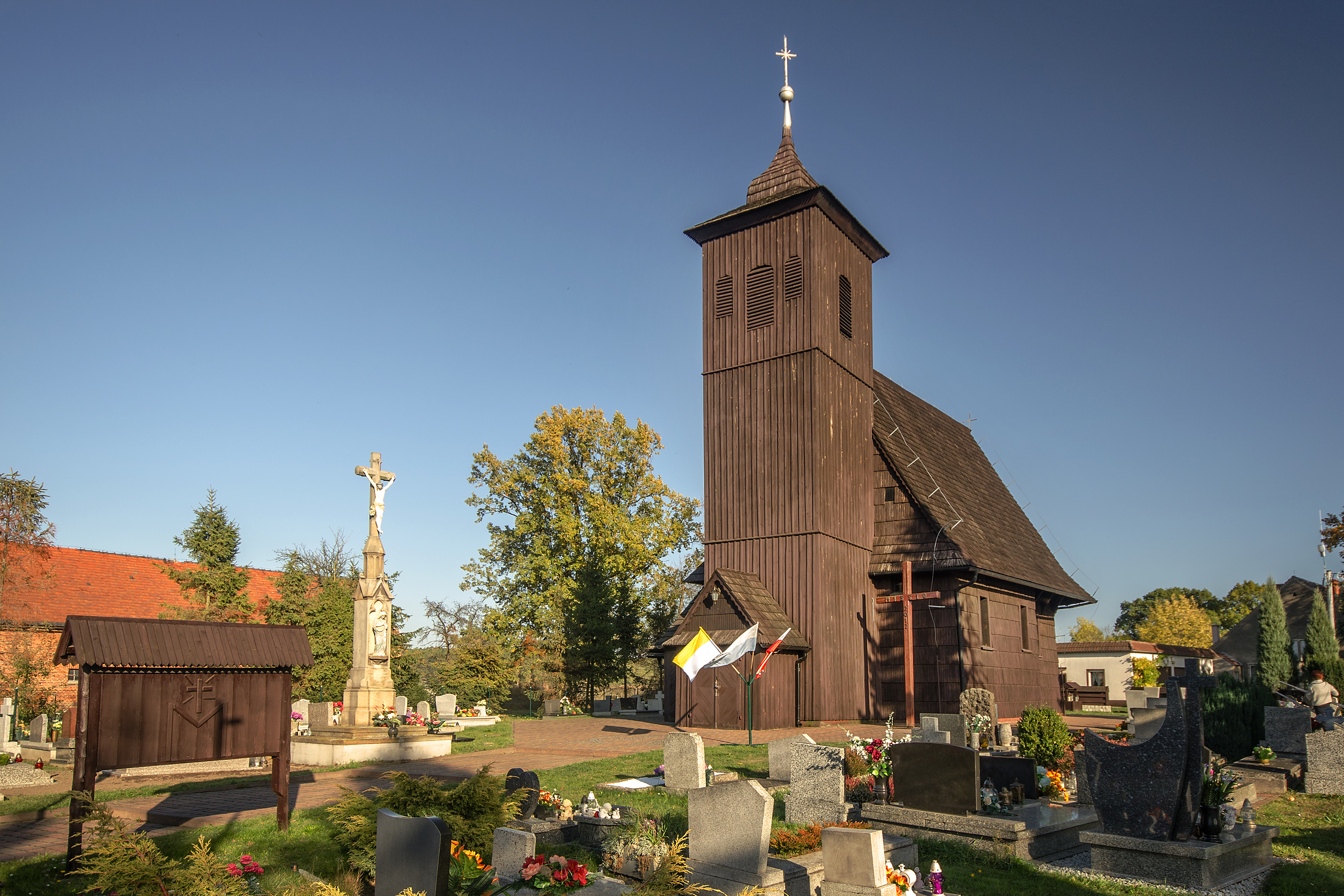
- Church of All Saints

- Location within Poland
- Coordinates: 50°52′12″N 18°13′33″E
- Country: Poland
- Voivodeship: Opole
- County: Kluczbork
- Gmina: Lasowice Wielkie

Population
  - Total: 764
- Time zone: UTC+1 (CET)
  - Summer (DST): UTC+2 (CEST)
- Vehicle registration: OKL

Lasowice Wielkie [lasɔˈvit͡sɛ ˈvjɛlkʲɛ] is a village in Kluczbork County, Opole Voivodeship, in southern Poland. It is the seat of the gmina (administrative district) called Gmina Lasowice Wielkie.

There is an old wooden church in Lasowice Wielkie from the 16th century. The village is officially bilingual as the majority of its population are Germans. Bilingual signs were installed recently.

== History ==
In the Upper Silesia plebiscite of 20 March 1921, 394 inhabitants (84.2%) voted to remain in Germany, 74 to rejoin Poland. Thus Groß Lassowitz remained part of the Weimar Republic.

Two Polish citizens were murdered by Nazi Germany in the village during World War II.
