= Chudoba, Gmina Lasowice Wielkie =

Chudoba
- Village
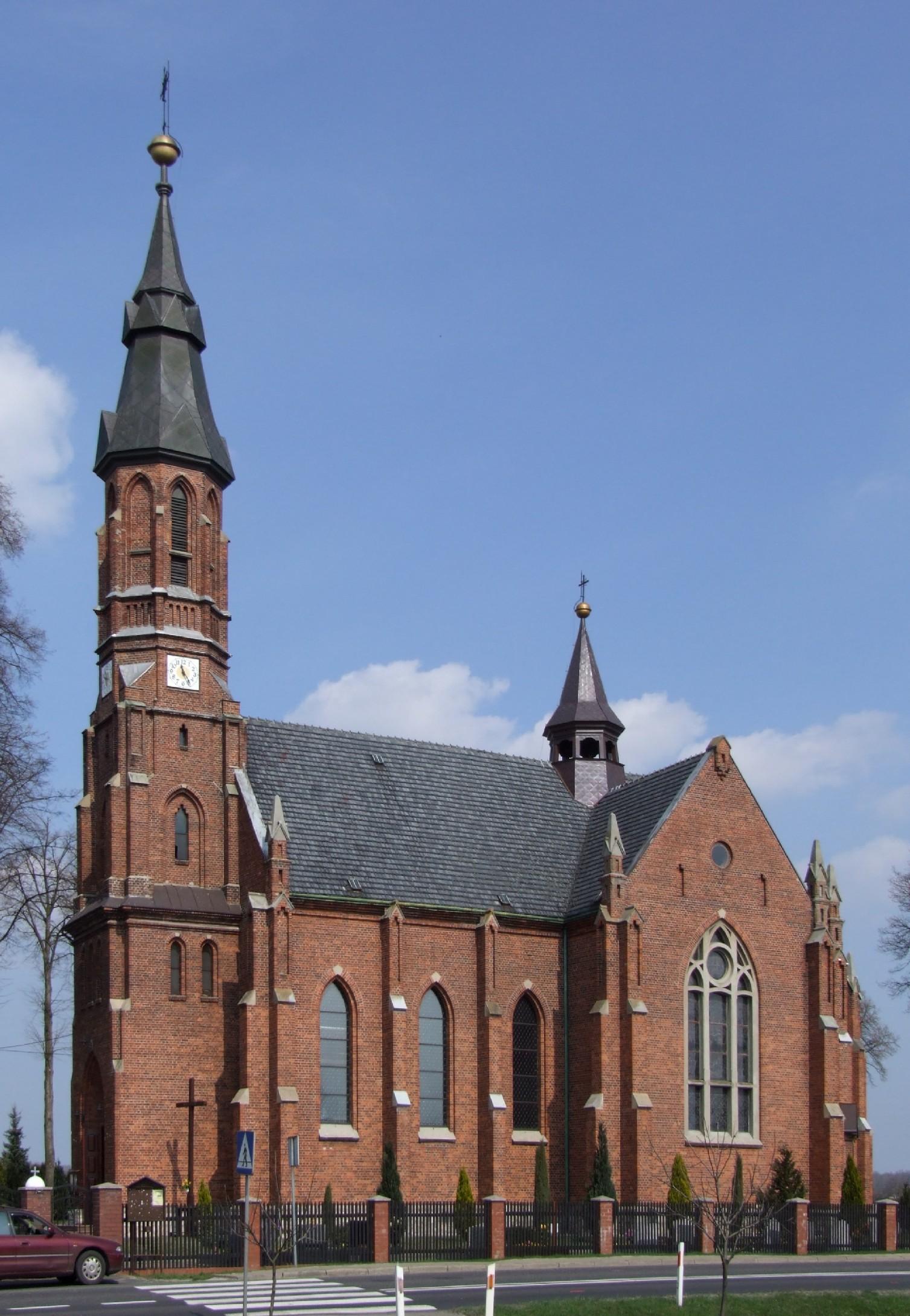
- Church in Chudoba

- Location within Poland
- Coordinates: 50°51′N 18°17′E
- Country: Poland
- Voivodeship: Opole
- County: Kluczbork
- Gmina: Lasowice Wielkie
- Population: 790
- Website: http://twojachudoba.pl/

Chudoba [xuˈdɔba] is a village in the administrative district of Gmina Lasowice Wielkie, within Kluczbork County, Opole Voivodeship, in south-western Poland.

== Notable residents ==
- Bernhard Jagoda (1940-2015) German politician
