= Gmina Lasowice Wielkie =

Gmina Lasowice Wielkie Gemeinde Gross Lassowitz Lasowice Wielkie Commune
- Gmina
- Flag Coat of arms
- Interactive map of Gmina Lasowice Wielkie
- Coordinates (Lasowice Wielkie): 50°52′12″N 18°13′33″E
- Country: Poland
- Voivodeship: Opole
- County: Kluczbork
- Seat: Lasowice Wielkie

Area
  - Total: 210.84 km^{2} (81.41 sq mi)

Population (2019-06-30)
  - Total: 6,864
  - Density: 32.56/km^{2} (84.32/sq mi)
- Time zone: UTC+1 (CET)
  - Summer (DST): UTC+2 (CEST)
- Vehicle registration: OKL
- Website: http://www.lasowicewielkie.pl/

Gmina Lasowice Wielkie (German: Gemeinde Gross Lassowitz) is a rural gmina (administrative district) in Kluczbork County, Opole Voivodeship, in southern Poland. Its seat is the village of Lasowice Wielkie, which lies approximately 13 kilometres (8 mi) south of Kluczbork and 31 km (19 mi) north-east of the regional capital Opole.

The gmina covers an area of 210.84 square kilometres (81.4 sq mi), and as of 2019 its total population is 6,864. Since 2006 the commune, like much of the area, has been bilingual in Polish and German.

The gmina contains part of the protected area called Stobrawa Landscape Park.

== Administrative divisions ==
The commune contains the villages and settlements of:

- Lasowice Wielkie
- Chocianowice
- Chudoba
- Ciarka
- Gronowice
- Jasienie
- Laskowice
- Lasowice Małe
- Oś
- Szumirad
- Trzebiszyn
- Tuły
- Wędrynia

== Neighbouring gminas ==
Gmina Lasowice Wielkie is bordered by the gminas of Kluczbork, Łubniany, Murów, Olesno, Turawa and Zębowice.
