= Dąbrówka Łubniańska =

Dąbrówka Łubniańska Lugnian Dombrowka
- Village
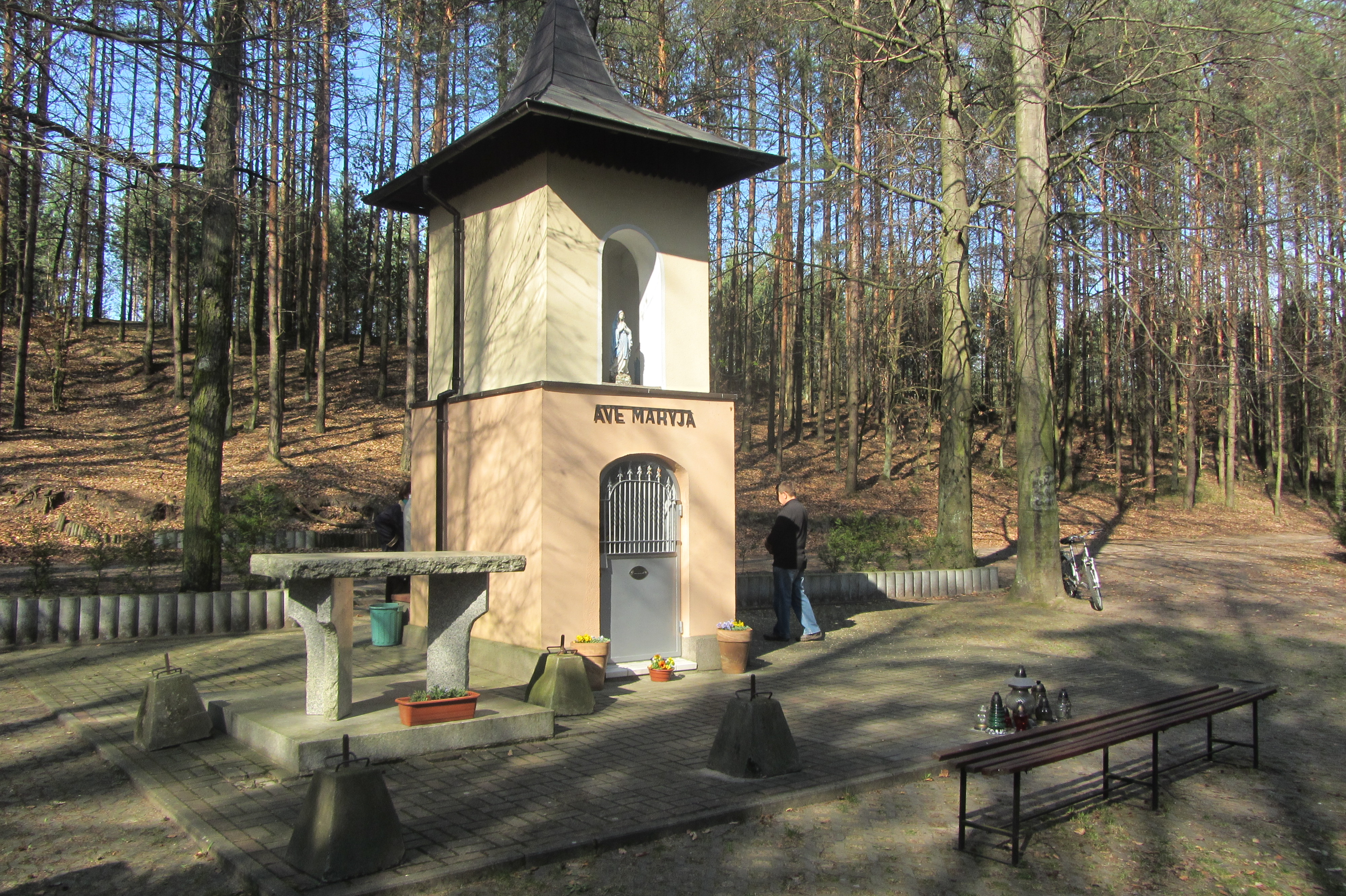
- Mineral spring with the Studzionka chapel

- Location within Poland
- Coordinates: 50°47′34″N 18°01′12″E
- Country: Poland
- Voivodeship: Opole
- County: Opole
- Gmina: Łubniany
- Postal code: 46-024

Dąbrówka Łubniańska ([dɔmˈbrufka wubˈɲaɲska], additional name in German: Lugnian Dombrowka) is a village in the administrative district of Gmina Łubniany, within Opole County, Opole Voivodeship, in south-western Poland.
