= Szumirad =

- Village
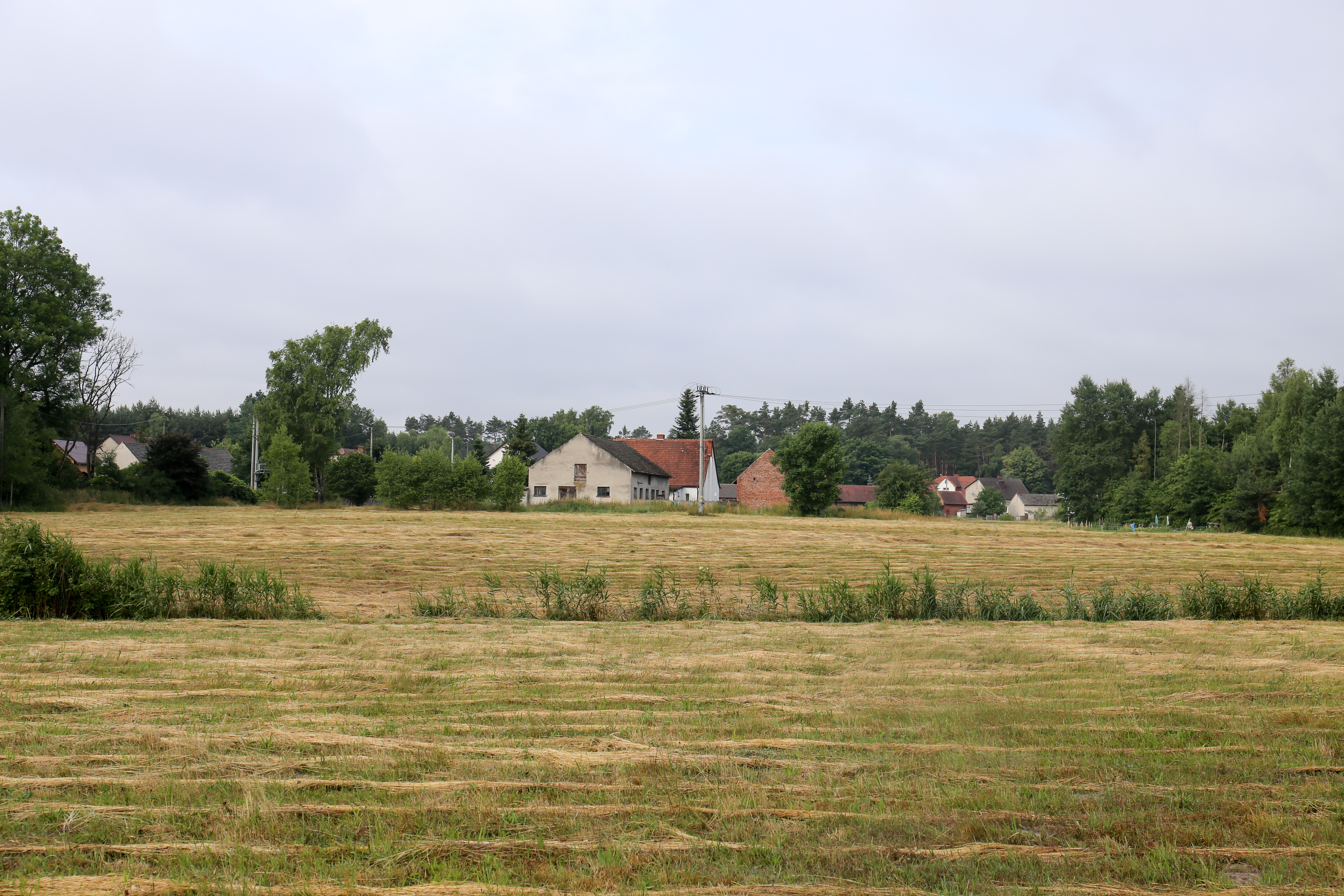

- Location within Poland
- Coordinates: 50°50′N 18°15′E
- Country: Poland
- Voivodeship: Opole
- County: Kluczbork
- Gmina: Lasowice Wielkie
- Population: 175

Szumirad [ʂuˈmirat] is a village in the administrative district of Gmina Lasowice Wielkie, within Kluczbork County, Opole Voivodeship, in south-western Poland.
