= Tuły =

- Village
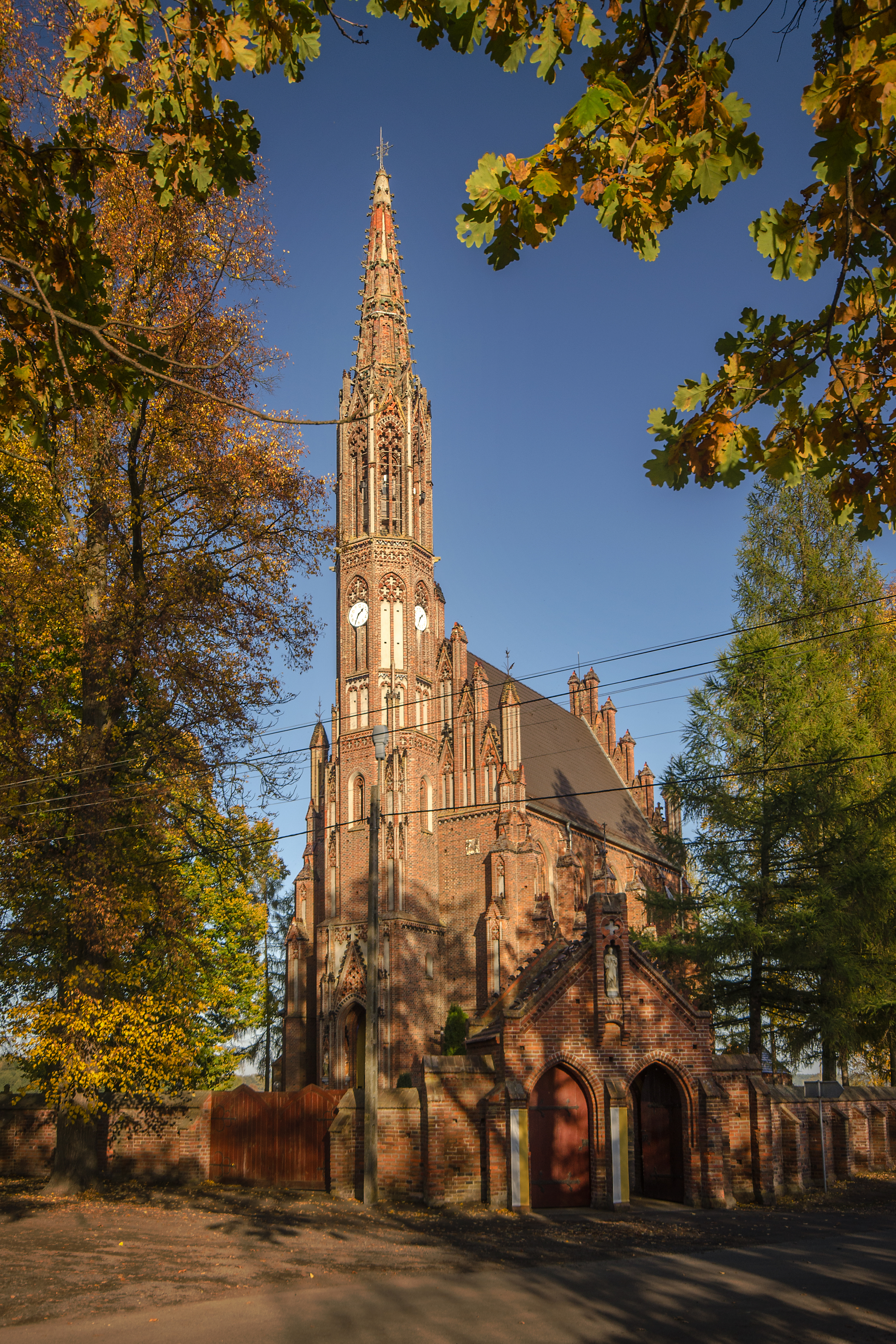
- Our Lady of Sorrows church in Tuły

- Location within Poland
- Coordinates: 50°52′N 18°9′E
- Country: Poland
- Voivodeship: Opole
- County: Kluczbork
- Gmina: Lasowice Wielkie
- First mentioned: 13th century

Population
  - Total: 268
- Time zone: UTC+1 (CET)
  - Summer (DST): UTC+2 (CEST)
- Area code: +48 77
- Car plates: OKL

Tuły [ˈtuwɨ] (German: Thule) is a village in the administrative district of Gmina Lasowice Wielkie, within Kluczbork County, Opole Voivodeship, in south-western Poland.

== History ==
The village was first mentioned in the 13th century, when it was part of fragmented Piast-ruled Poland. Later on, it was also part of Bohemia (Czechia), Prussia, and Germany. In 1883, it had a population of 507.

During World War II, the Germans operated the E330 forced labour subcamp of the Stalag VIII-B/344 prisoner-of-war camp in the village. After Germany's defeat in the war, in 1945, the village became again part of Poland.

== Transport ==
There is a train station in the village.
