= Gronowice, Opole Voivodeship =

Gronowice
- Village
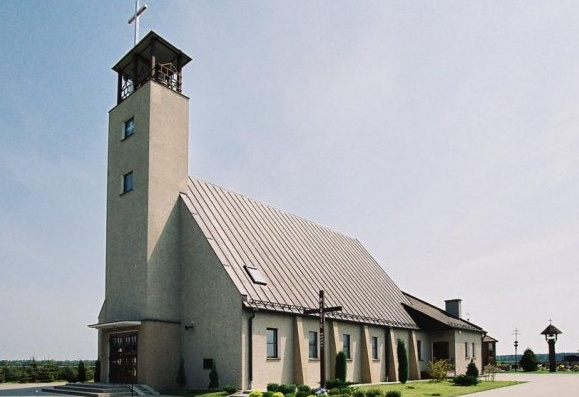
- Church of Saint Giles

- Location within Poland
- Coordinates: 50°54′35″N 18°18′02″E
- Country: Poland
- Voivodeship: Opole
- County: Kluczbork
- Gmina: Lasowice Wielkie

Population
  - Total: 673

Gronowice [ɡrɔnɔˈvit͡sɛ] is a village in the administrative district of Gmina Lasowice Wielkie, within Kluczbork County, Opole Voivodeship, in south-western Poland.
