= Trzebiszyn, Opole Voivodeship =

Trzebiszyn
- Village
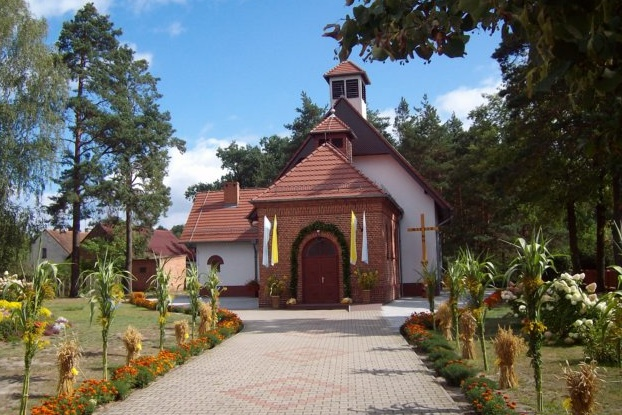
- Chapel

- Location within Poland
- Coordinates: 50°51′N 18°11′E
- Country: Poland
- Voivodeship: Opole
- County: Kluczbork
- Gmina: Lasowice Wielkie
- Population: 248

Trzebiszyn [tʂɛˈbiʂɨn] is a village in the administrative district of Gmina Lasowice Wielkie, within Kluczbork County, Opole Voivodeship, in south-western Poland.
