= Oś =

- Village
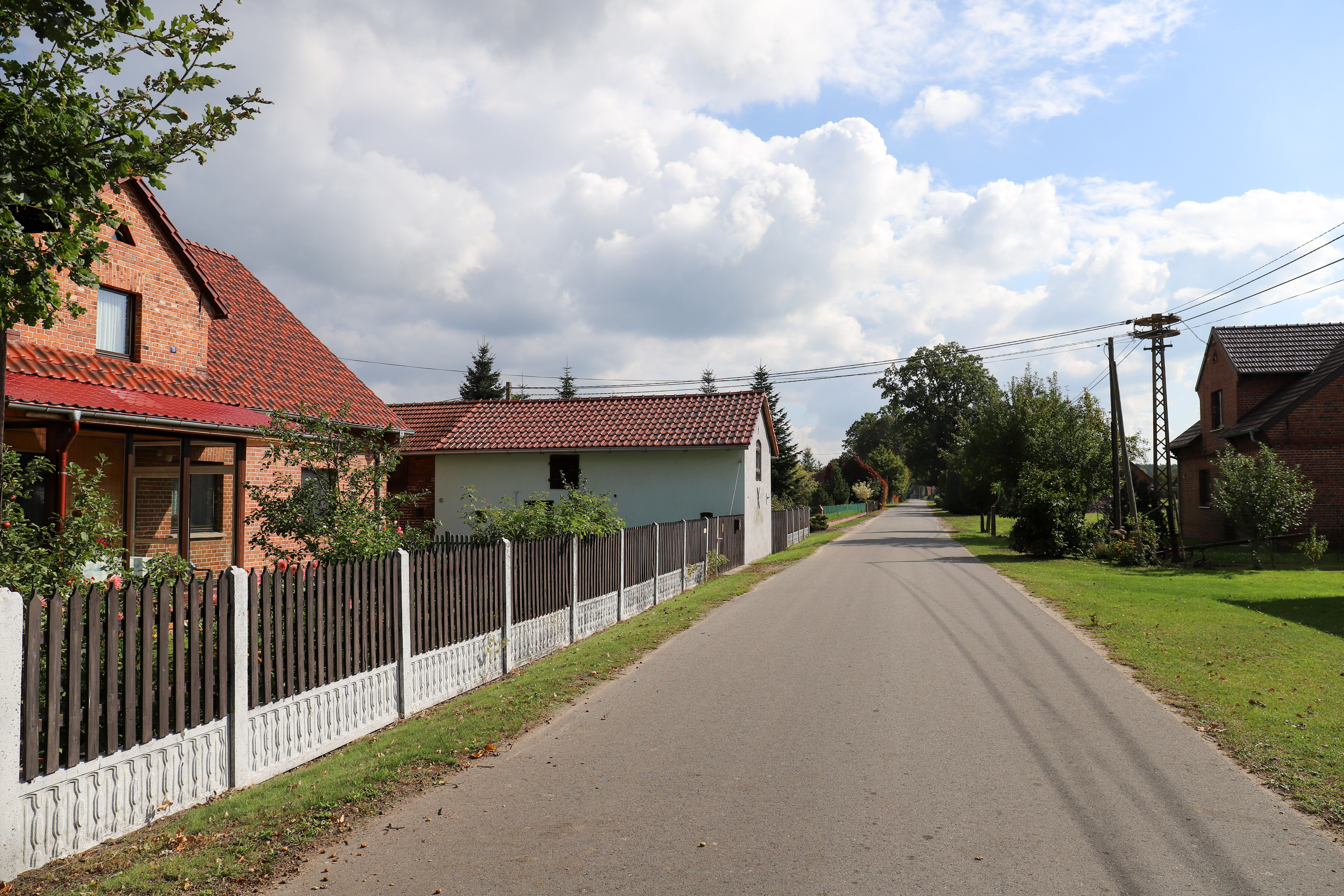

- Location within Poland
- Coordinates: 50°53′12″N 18°10′12″E
- Country: Poland
- Voivodeship: Opole
- County: Kluczbork
- Gmina: Lasowice Wielkie

Population
  - Total: 62
- Time zone: UTC+1 (CET)
  - Summer (DST): UTC+2 (CEST)
- Postal code: 46-282
- Vehicle registration: OKL

Oś [ɔɕ] is a village in the administrative district of Gmina Lasowice Wielkie, within Kluczbork County, Opole Voivodeship, in south-western Poland.
