= Ciarka =

Ciarka Schiorke
- Village
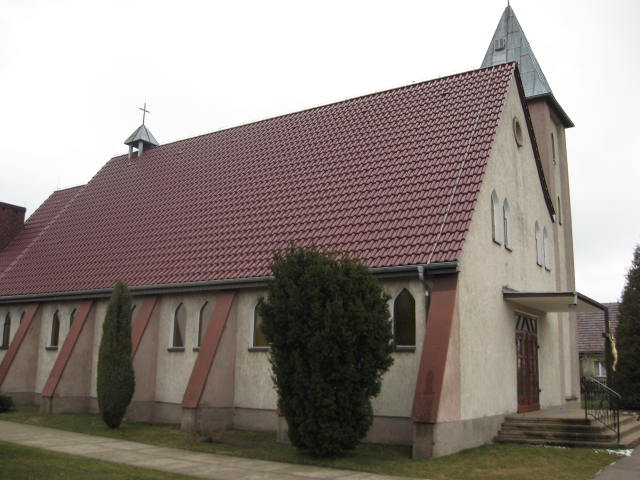
- Saints Peter and Paul church in Ciarka

- Location within Poland
- Coordinates: 50°55′46″N 18°18′52″E
- Country: Poland
- Voivodeship: Opole
- County: Kluczbork
- Gmina: Lasowice Wielkie
- Time zone: UTC+1 (CET)
  - Summer (DST): UTC+2 (CEST)
- Postal code: 46-280
- Vehicle registration: OKL

Ciarka ([ˈt͡ɕarka], German: Schiorke) is a village in the administrative district of Gmina Lasowice Wielkie, within Kluczbork County, Opole Voivodeship, in south-western Poland.

The Expressway S11 bypasses the village in the north-east.
