= Lasowice Małe, Opole Voivodeship =

Lasowice Małe
- Village
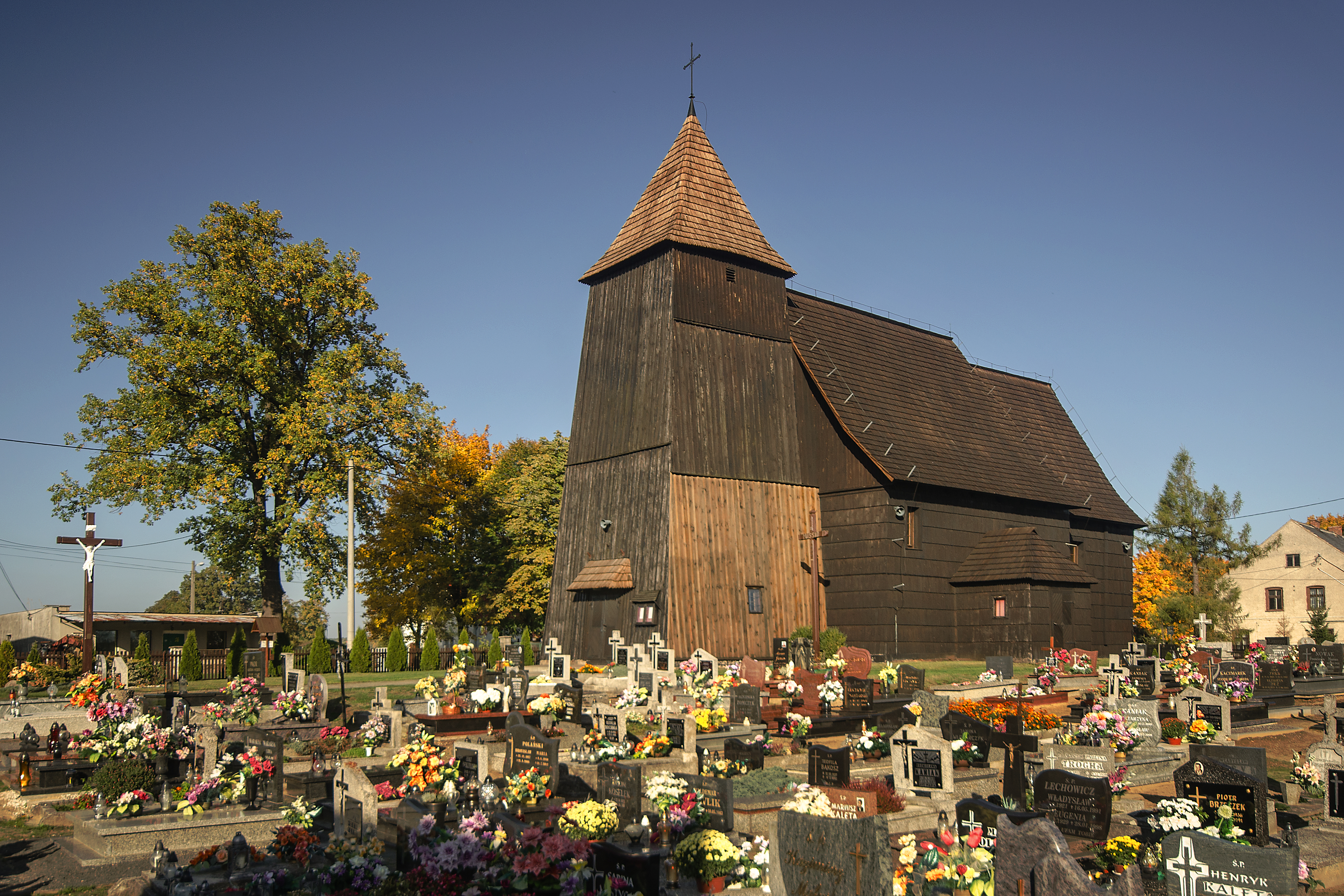
- Wooden church in Lasowice Małe

- Location within Poland
- Coordinates: 50°54′20″N 18°15′30″E
- Country: Poland
- Voivodeship: Opole
- County: Kluczbork
- Gmina: Lasowice Wielkie
- Highest elevation: 220 m (720 ft)
- Lowest elevation: 200 m (660 ft)
- Population: 553
- Website: http://lasowice.eu

Lasowice Małe [lasɔˈvit͡sɛ ˈmawɛ] is a village in the administrative district of Gmina Lasowice Wielkie, within Kluczbork County, Opole Voivodeship, in south-western Poland.
