= St. Lawrence's Church, Laskowice =

Coordinates: 50.5047°N 18.0648°E

St. Lawrence's Church
- Kościół św. Wawrzyńca w Laskowicach
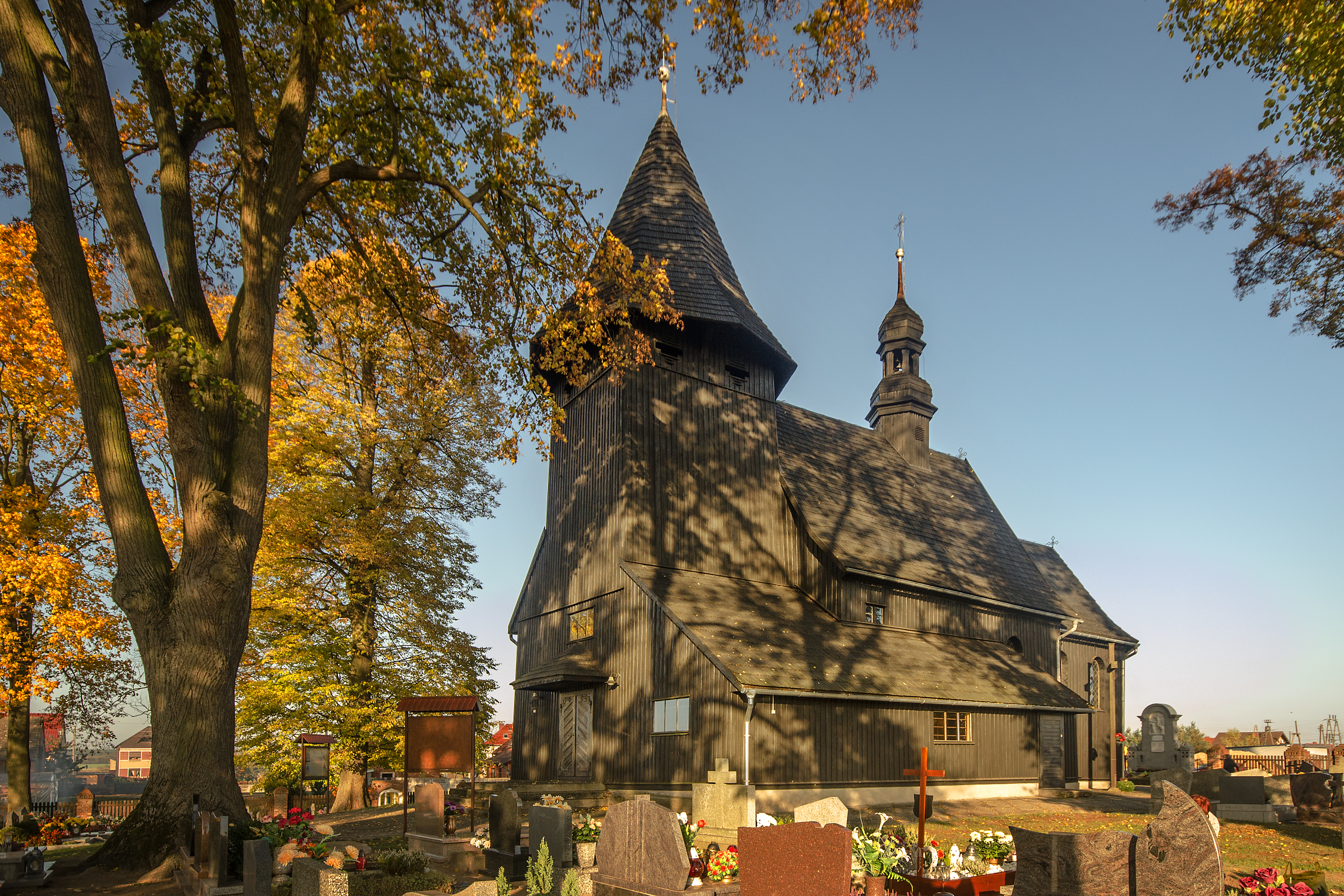
- St. Lawrence's Church
- St. Lawrence's Church
- Location: Laskowice
- Country: Poland
- Denomination: Roman Catholic

Architecture
- Groundbreaking: 1685
- Completed: 1686

Specifications
- Materials: Wood

Administration
- Diocese: Roman Catholic Diocese of Opole
- Parish: Parafia Matki Boskiej Bolesnej w Tułach

St. Lawrence's Church is a historic, wooden cemetery chapel in Laskowice, Kluczbork County in Poland. Since May 5, 1964 the church was registered on the Register of Objects of Cultural Heritage for the Opole Voivodeship, with the registration number of 859/64.

The church was built in 1686. Located on a small hill in the western-side of Laskowice. Presently, the church served as a cemetery chapel.
