= Masów =

Masów Massow
- Village
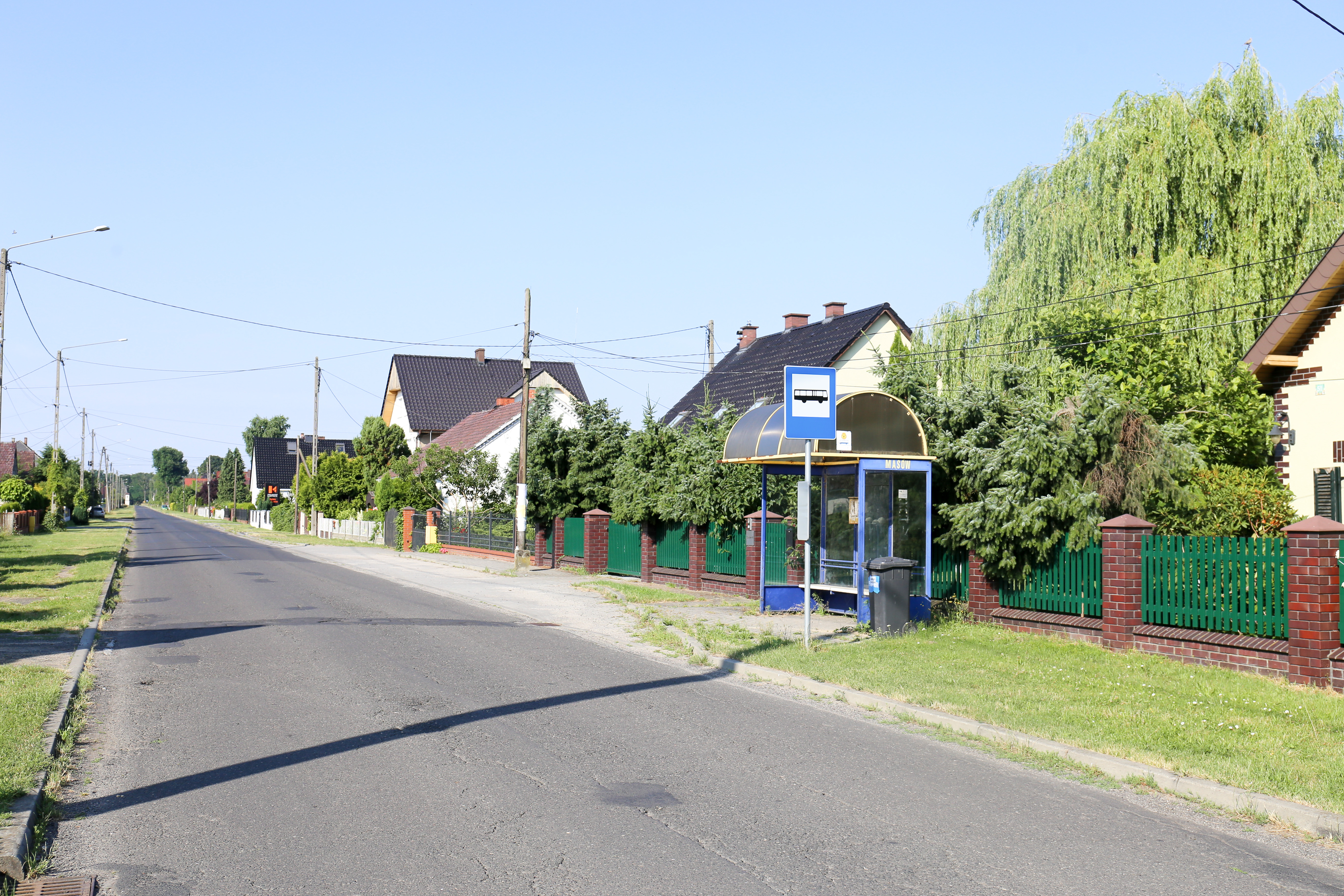

- Location within Poland
- Coordinates: 50°46′N 17°59′E
- Country: Poland
- Voivodeship: Opole
- County: Opole
- Gmina: Łubniany
- Postal code: 46-024

Masów ([ˈmasuf], additional name in German: Massow) is a village in the administrative district of Gmina Łubniany, within Opole County, Opole Voivodeship, in southern Poland.
