= Arnstein =

- Town
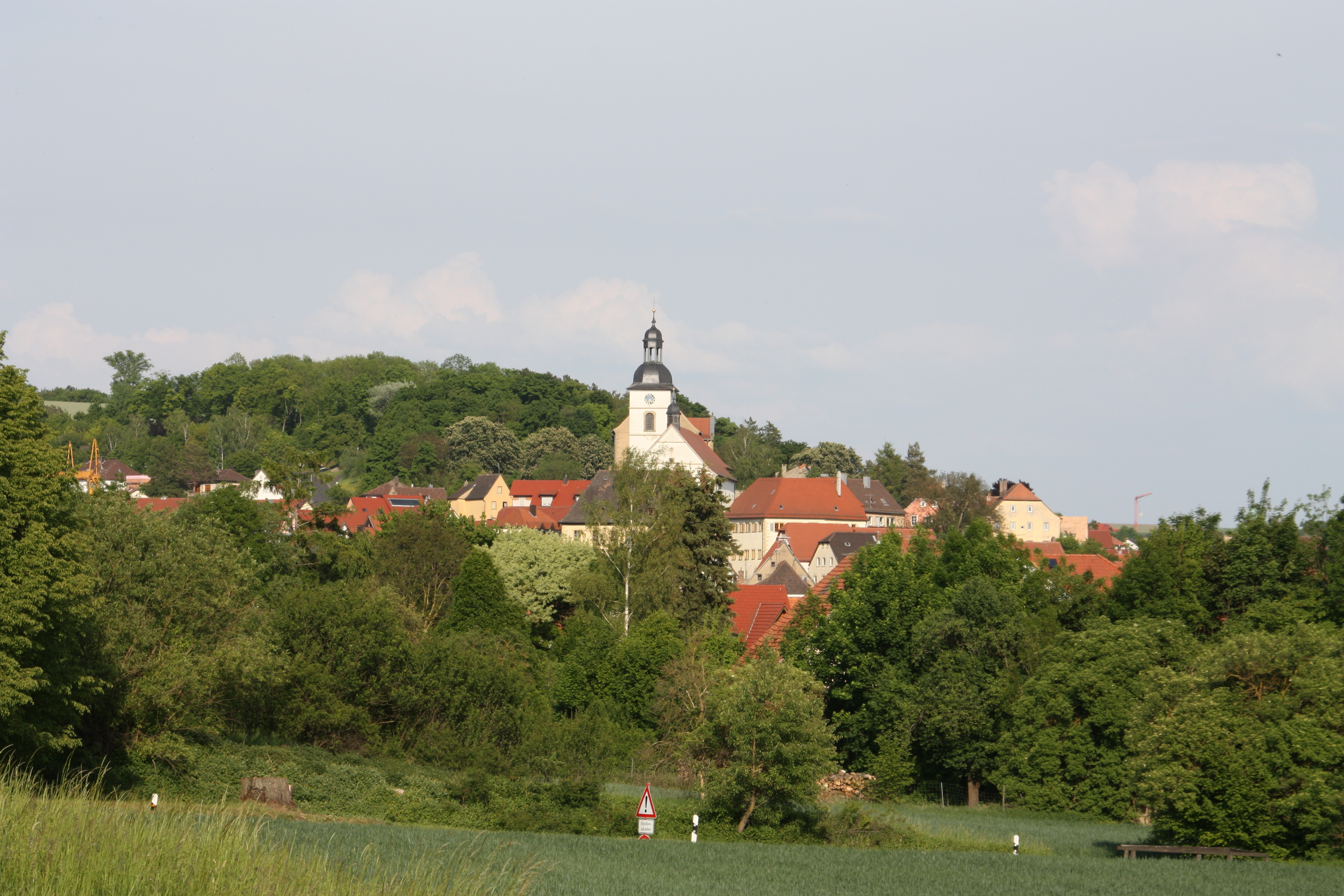
- Arnstein seen from the west

- Coat of arms

- Location of Arnstein within Main-Spessart district
- Interactive map of Arnstein
- Location within Germany Location within Bavaria
- Coordinates: 49°58′N 09°59′E
- Country: Germany
- State: Bavaria
- Admin. region: Unterfranken
- District: Main-Spessart
- Subdivisions: 12 Stadtteile

Government
  - Mayor (2019–25): Franz-Josef Sauer (CSU)

Area
  - Total: 112.1 km^{2} (43.3 sq mi)
- Elevation: 228 m (748 ft)

Population (2025-12-31)
  - Total: 8,235
  - Density: 73.46/km^{2} (190.3/sq mi)
- Time zone: UTC+01:00 (CET)
  - Summer (DST): UTC+02:00 (CEST)
- Postal codes: 97450
- Dialling codes: 09363
- Vehicle registration: MSP
- Website: arnstein.de

Arnstein (German pronunciation: [ˈaʁnʃtaɪn]) is a town in the Main-Spessart district in the Regierungsbezirk of Lower Franconia (Unterfranken) in Bavaria, Germany.

== Geography ==
=== Location ===
The town lies on the banks of the river Wern and is roughly 20 km from Schweinfurt and 25 km from Würzburg.

=== Constituent communities ===
Arnstein's Stadtteile are:

- Altbessingen
- Binsbach
- Binsfeld
- Büchold
- Dattensoll
- Gänheim
- Halsheim
- Heugrumbach
- Müdesheim
- Neubessingen
- Reuchelheim
- Schwebenried

== History ==
Town rights were granted in 1333 by Emperor Louis the Bavarian.

The former Oberamt of the Prince-Bishopric of Würzburg was in Bavaria's favour secularized and passed in 1805 to Grand Duke Ferdinand of Tuscany to form the Grand Duchy of Würzburg.

=== Population development ===
- 1961: 7943
- 1970: 8403
- 1987: 7640
- 1995: 8092
- 2005: 8345
- 2010: 8090
- 2015: 8161

== Politics ==
=== Mayor ===
- 1972-2002: Roland Metz (CSU)
- 2002-2014: Linda Plappert-Metz (CSU)
- 2014–2019: Anna Stolz (independent)
- 2019–incumbent: Franz Josef Sauer (CSU)

=== Town partnerships ===
- Cancale, Ille-et-Vilaine, Brittany, France (since 7 September 1988)
- Łubniany, Opole County, Opole Voivodeship, Poland (since 22 May 1993)

=== Coat of arms ===
The town's arms might be described thus: Argent in base a mount of three vert, thereon an eagle reguardant wings expanded sable armed Or and langued gules.

The usual German word for eagle is Adler, but the poetic word Aar also exists. The noun Aar can follow the weak declension, in which case the genitive form is Aaren. The "mount of three" (called a Dreiberg in German heraldry), moreover, can be taken to be a stone (Stein in German). This makes the arms canting, as the town's name, Arnstein, can be taken to mean "Eagle's Stone", which is the image suggested by the charges in the arms. The town's oldest known seal, from 1378, already showed this image, as have all Arnstein's seals and coats of arms since then, although the eagle has changed in size and shape over time. The tinctures are known to have been used since 1544.

== Culture and sightseeing ==
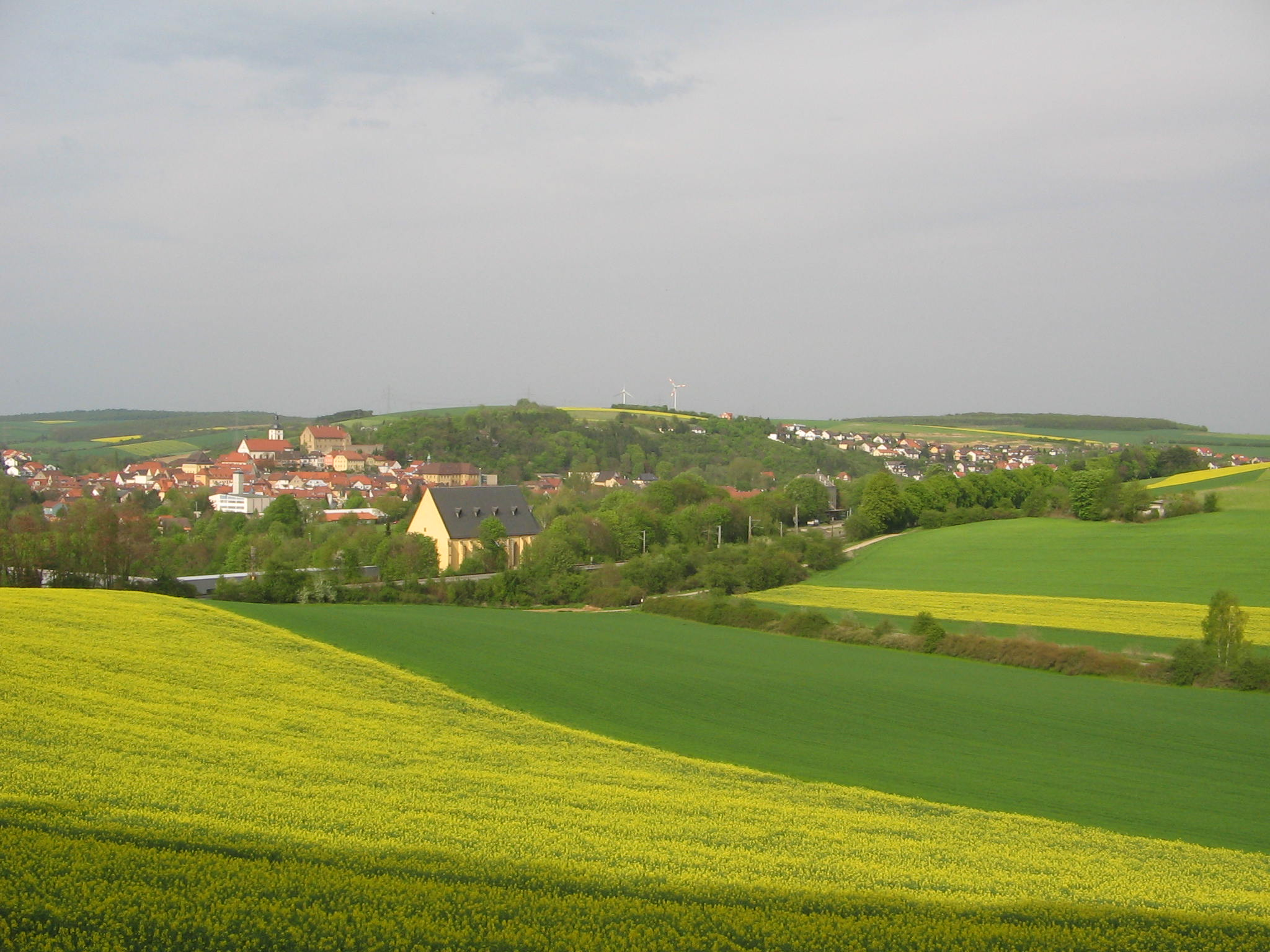
Gentle hills around Arnstein with a view of the Maria Sondheim pilgrimage church

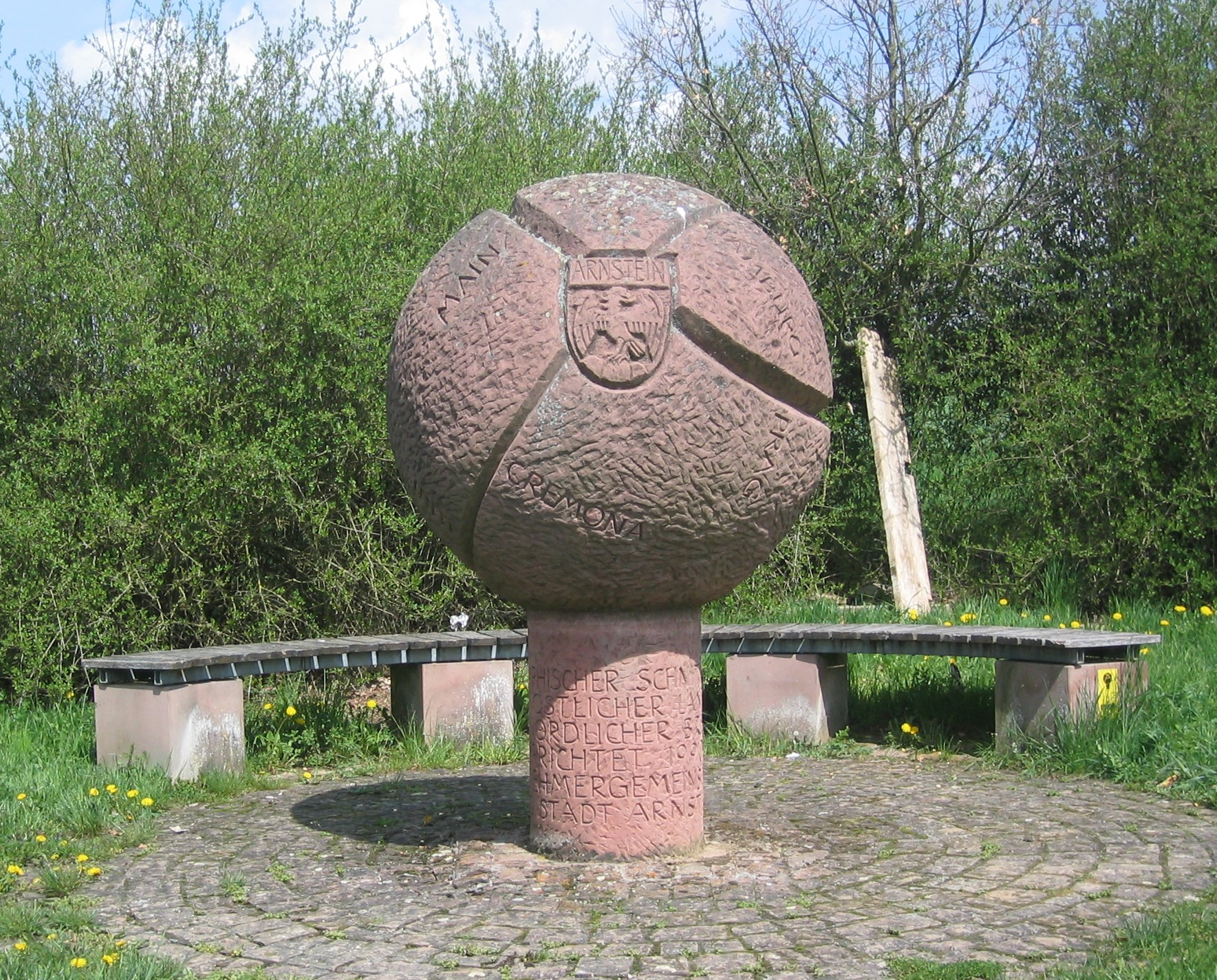
The Schnittpunktdenkmal

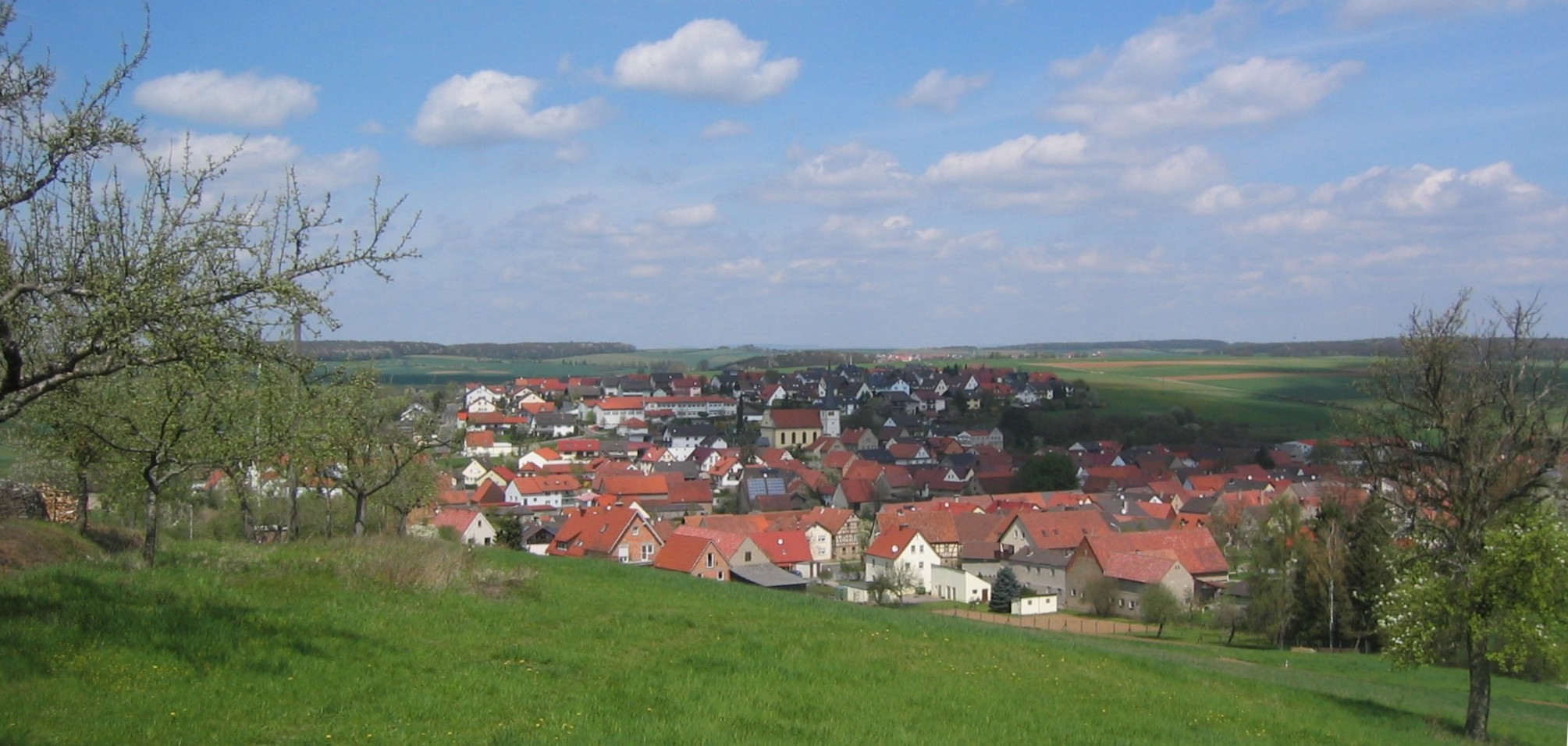
Schwebenried

=== Buildings ===
- The Late Gothic parish and pilgrimage church of Maria Sondheim was already Arnstein's parish church at the time when Sondheim was founded. During the time when Arnstein was pledged to the Lords of Hutten, it served the noble family as a family gravesite.
- The Town Hall was built about 1550 on the site of an older, Gothic building, and in 1754 it was renovated. In 1945, it burnt down to the foundation, but after the War was built once again in its old form.
- The Pfründnerspital is an historic building built in 1555 at the behest of Moritz von Hutten.
- The Balleshaus was built in 1725 by the clothier Georg Roth and served for more than two hundred years as a residential house. The town acquired it from its last owners, the family Balles, and renovated it. Ever since, it has housed the town library and archive.

In Arnstein's new residential area has stood since the late 1990s a terraced housing development with 20 low-energy houses, the so-called Arnsteiner Sonnenhäuser (“Sunhouses”). Part of the energy supply comes from a solar collector area of more than 210 m^{2} through which water is heated and household heating is provided. Furthermore, 95% of the space heat can be recovered through a controlled ventilation system. By using rainwater to flush the toilets, choosing ecologically friendly building materials, forgoing a basement and thus insulating the houses and taking other measures, further energy-saving and environmentally protective measures could be realized. The “Sunhouses” were built collaboratively by the 20 builders in the framework of the promotional programme for experimental home building, thereby reducing acquisition and planning costs.

=== Monuments ===
Not far outside Arnstein, on Bundesstraße 26a going towards Schwebenried, stands the Schnittpunktdenkmal, or “Crossing Point Monument”. It marks the spot where the 50th parallel of north latitude crosses the 10th meridian of east longitude: 50°N 10°E.

== Economy and infrastructure ==
=== Solar park ===
In May 2005, the world's biggest solar park was built near Arnstein (Erlasee).

=== MIWE ===
The biggest employer in town for over 80 years has been the firm MIWE GmbH. At the main MIWE works in Arnstein today, roughly 400 workers manufacture industrial ovens, ovens for bakeries and bakery and cooling technology products.

=== Education ===
As of 2007 the following institutions existed in Arnstein:

- Michael-Ignaz-Schmitt-Realschule
- Primary school and Hauptschule
- Kindergartens

== Recreation ==
- The Naturbadesee Arnstein (lake) lies right near the town. The bathing lake was laid out in the course of the kleine Gartenschau (“Little Garden Show”) in 1997. There are various sunbathing lawns, a raft, a beach volleyball court and a kiosk with a lakeside terrace. For children there is a playground with a “living willow” village (Weidendorf) and a nature playground.
- The Walderlebnispfad Arnstein (“Forest Adventure Path”) lies between Arnstein and Reuchelheim somewhat above the dale and is roughly 2.5 km long.
- The Gewässerlehrpfad Wern/Arnstein (“Bodies of Water Learning Path”) is about 1 km long.
- The Wernradweg (“Wern Cycle Path”) is a 78 km-long cycle path running from the Wern's source by way of Arnstein down to the river's outflow into the Main near Gemünden-Wernfeld.

== Famous people ==
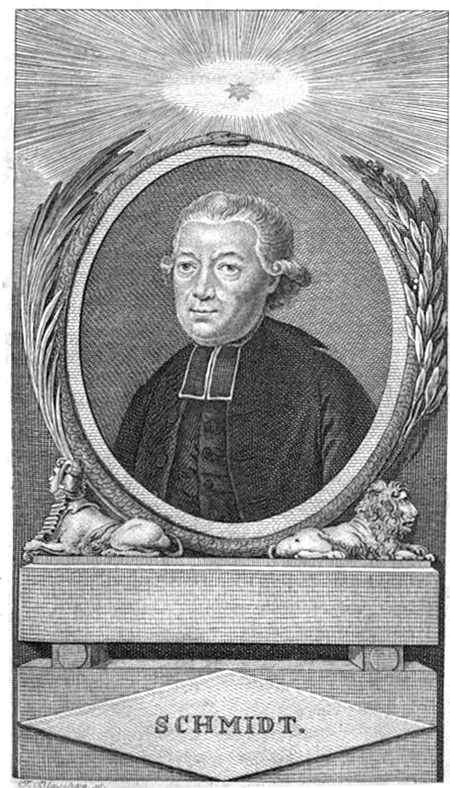
Michael Ignaz Schmidt

- Moritz von Hutten (1503–1552), Prince-Bishop
- Michael Ignaz Schmidt (1736–1794), historian
- Michael Siegel (1882–1979), lawyer
- Emil Greul (1895–1993), admiral's staff physician and the navy's last sanitation chief
- Fritz Burkhardt (1900–1983), graphic artist and painter
- Christian Wück (born 1973), former Bundesliga footballer, head coach of the Germany women's national team
