= Biadacz, Gmina Łubniany =

Biadacz
- Village
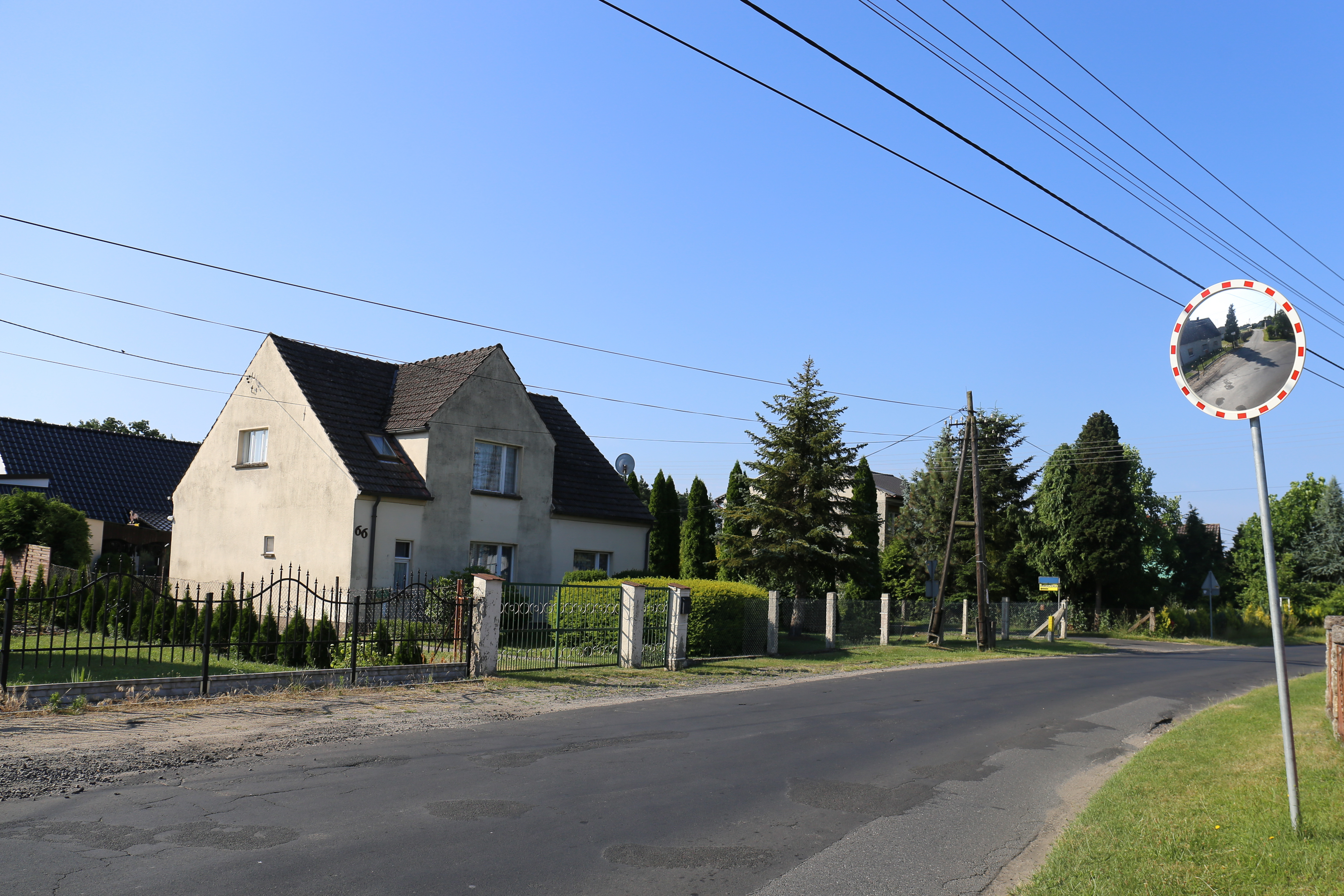

- Location within Poland
- Coordinates: 50°44′N 17°58′E
- Country: Poland
- Voivodeship: Opole
- County: Opole
- Gmina: Łubniany

Biadacz [ˈbjadat͡ʂ] is a village in the administrative district of Gmina Łubniany, within Opole County, Opole Voivodeship, in south-western Poland.
