= Wędrynia =

- Village
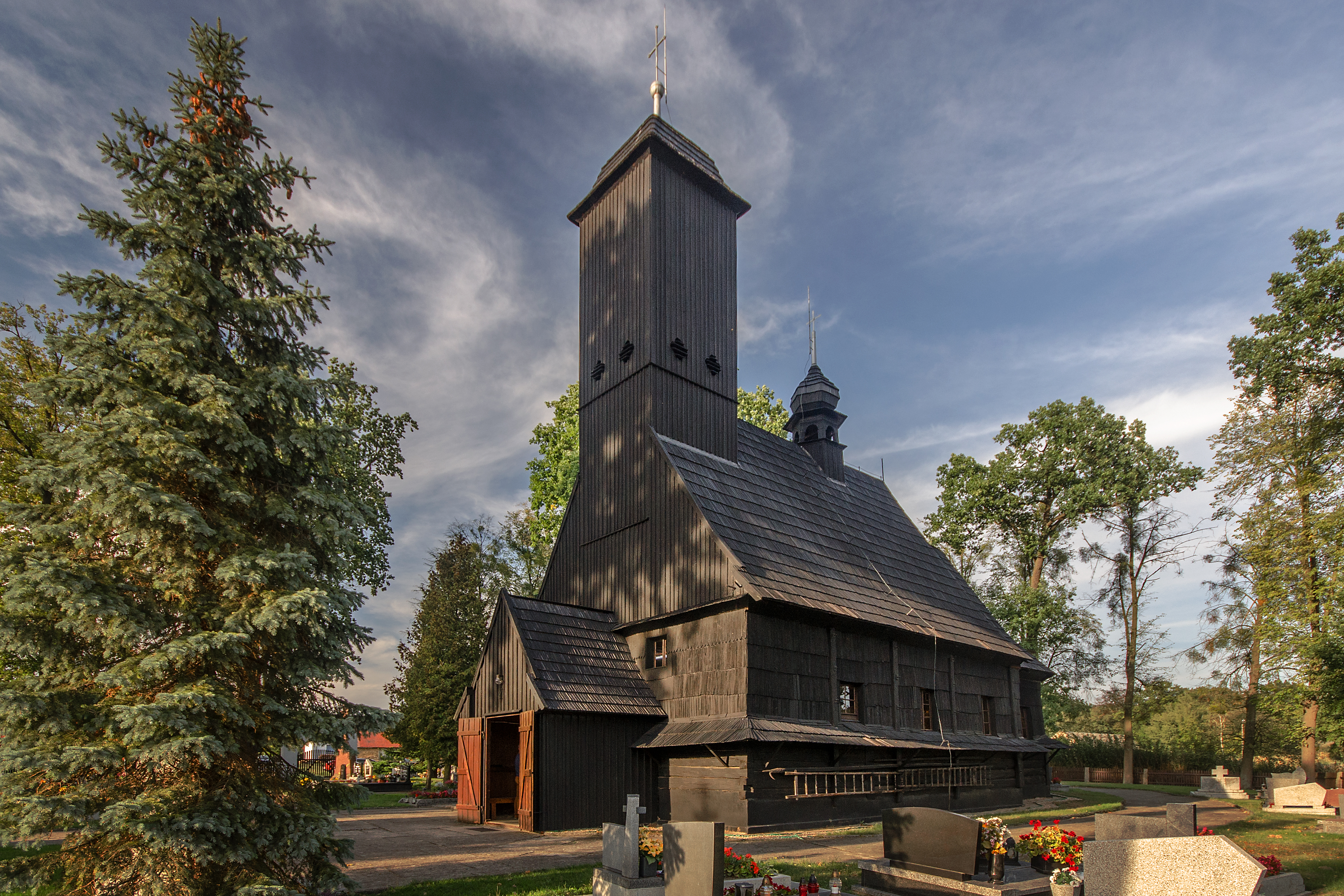
- Church of Saint John the Baptist

- Location within Poland
- Coordinates: 50°52′N 18°19′E
- Country: Poland
- Voivodeship: Opole
- County: Kluczbork
- Gmina: Lasowice Wielkie

Population
  - Total: 476

Wędrynia [vɛnˈdrɨɲa] is a village in the administrative district of Gmina Lasowice Wielkie, within Kluczbork County, Opole Voivodeship, in south-western Poland.

== People ==
- Valeska Bethusy-Huc (1849–1926), German writer
