= Luboszyce, Opole Voivodeship =

Luboszyce Luboschütz
- Village
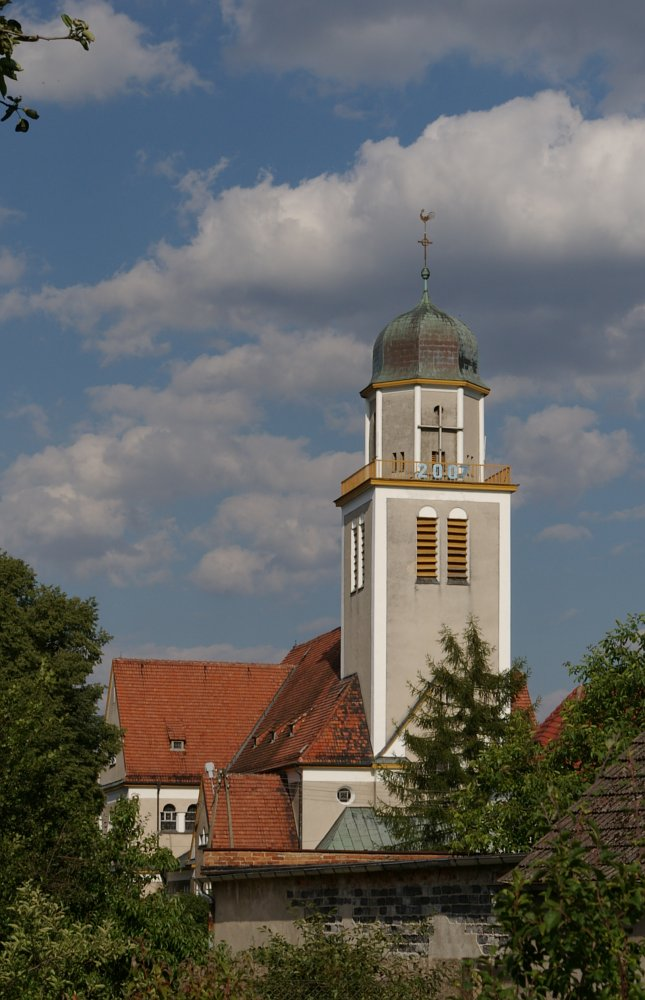
- Church of Saint Anthony

- Location within Poland
- Coordinates: 50°44′N 17°58′E
- Country: Poland
- Voivodeship: Opole
- County: Opole
- Gmina: Łubniany

Population (approx.)
  - Total: 1,000
- Postal code: 46-022

Luboszyce ([lubɔˈʂɨt͡sɛ], additional name in German: Luboschütz) is a village in the administrative district of Gmina Łubniany, within Opole County, Opole Voivodeship, in southern Poland.
