= Holy Trinity Church, Baldwinowice =

Coordinates: 51.0703°N 17.4840°E

Holy Trinity Church
- Kościół Trójcy Świętej
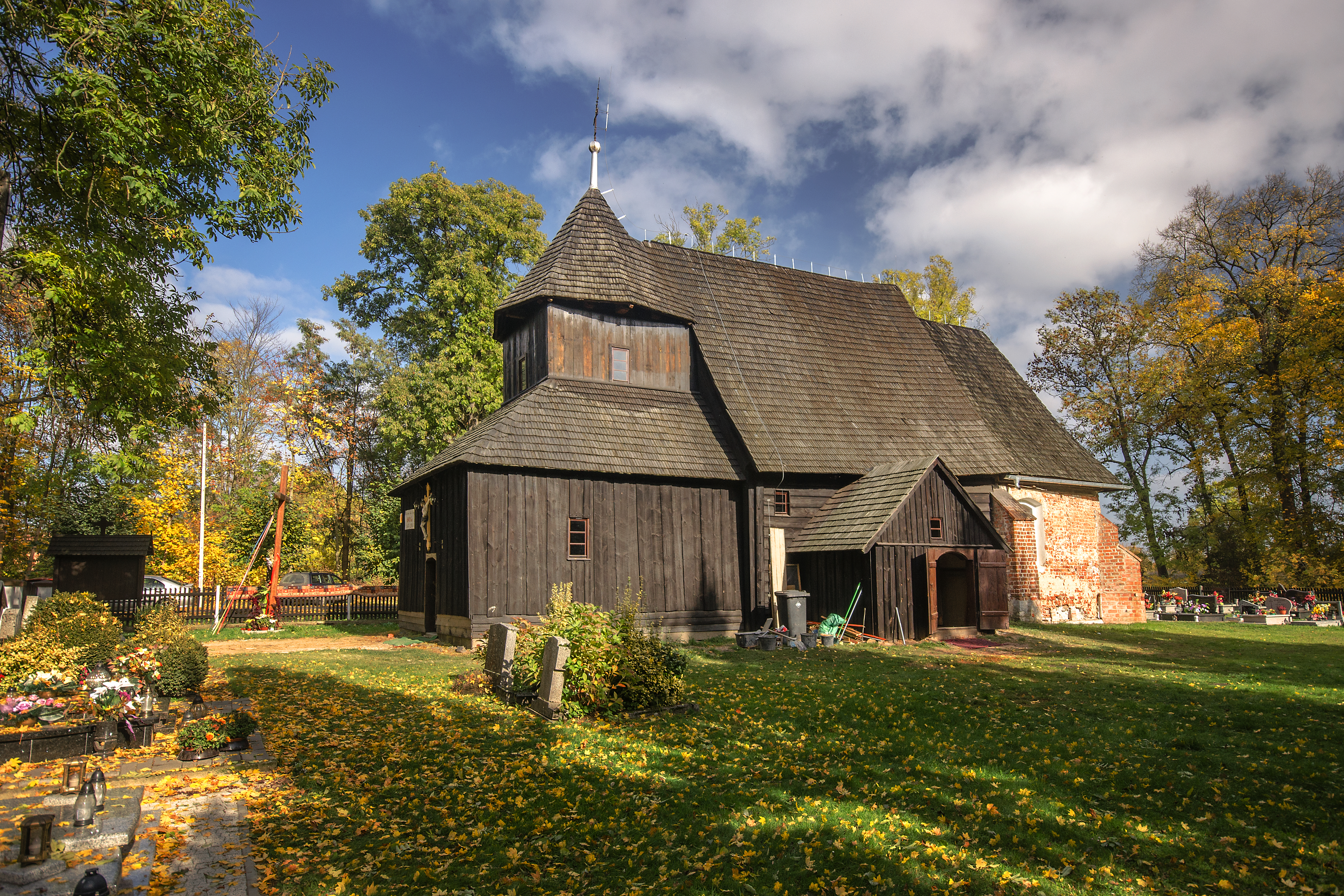
- Holy Trinity Church
- Holy Trinity Church
- Location: Baldwinowice
- Country: Poland
- Denomination: Roman Catholic

Architecture
- Completed: 1414

Specifications
- Materials: Wood, brick

Administration
- Parish: Parafia św. Michała Archanioła w Michalicach

Holy Trinity Church in Baldwinowice, Poland, is a wooden-brick church built in 1414. The chapel of ease is located on the route between Namysłów and Kępno, being one of the oldest in Namysłów County.

The oldest parts of the church (chancel and sacristy) originate from before 1414, and as such are bricked. The wooden nave was constructed in 1592, whilst the tower from the second half of the seventeenth-century. The nave-wide part of the church tower has a carport, whilst the upper tower has an eight-part tent-carport, covered with a shake wooden shingle.

Presently, the church serves as a chapel of ease of St. Michael Archangel Parish in Michalice.
