= Ziemiełowice Palace =

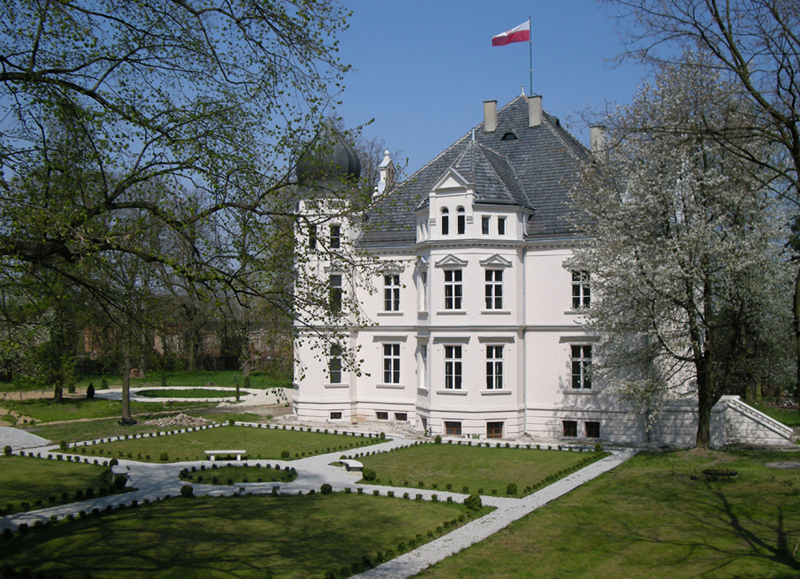
- Ziemiełowice Palace

- Location of Wilhelm Ellis Rau Palace in Poland Ziemiełowice Palace (Opole Voivodeship)
- 51°03′22″N 17°45′10″E
- Location: Ziemiełowice, Opole Voivodeship; in Poland

History
- Built: 1898

Site notes
- Area: 536 m^{2} (5,770 sq ft)
- Architectural style: Eclecticist

Ziemiełowice Palace (Polish: Pałac w Ziemiełowicach) - a historical building, located in Ziemiełowice in Namysłów County, Poland. Since 2006, the palace has been owned by the Praski family from Opole, which has successively restored the castle into a classic example of a palace-garden complex prevalent across the nineteenth-century, retaining its Eclecticist character.

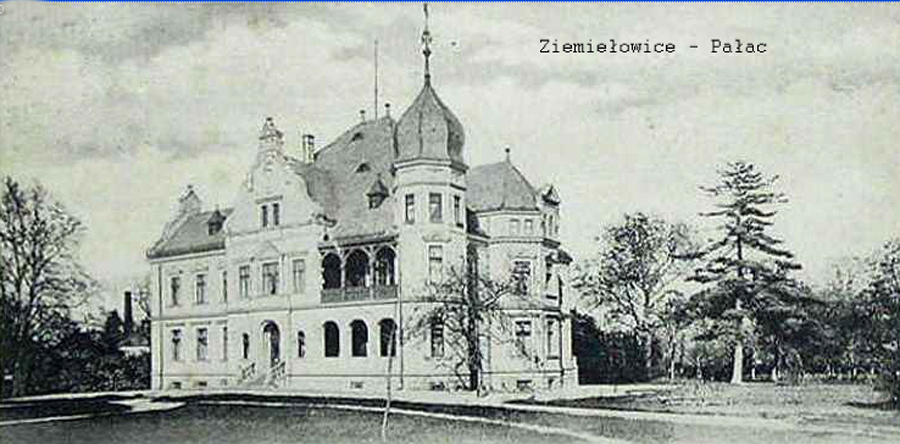
View of Ziemiełowice Palace in 1920

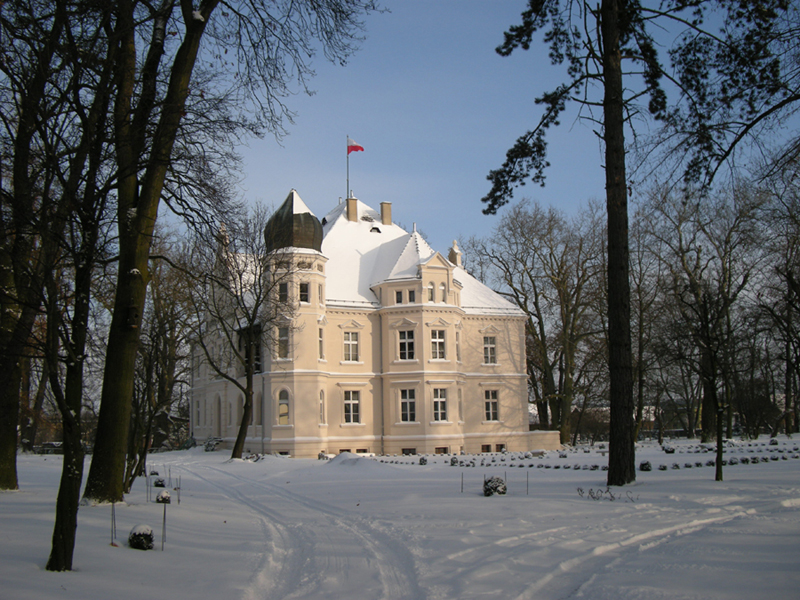
Ziemiełowice Palace during winter time

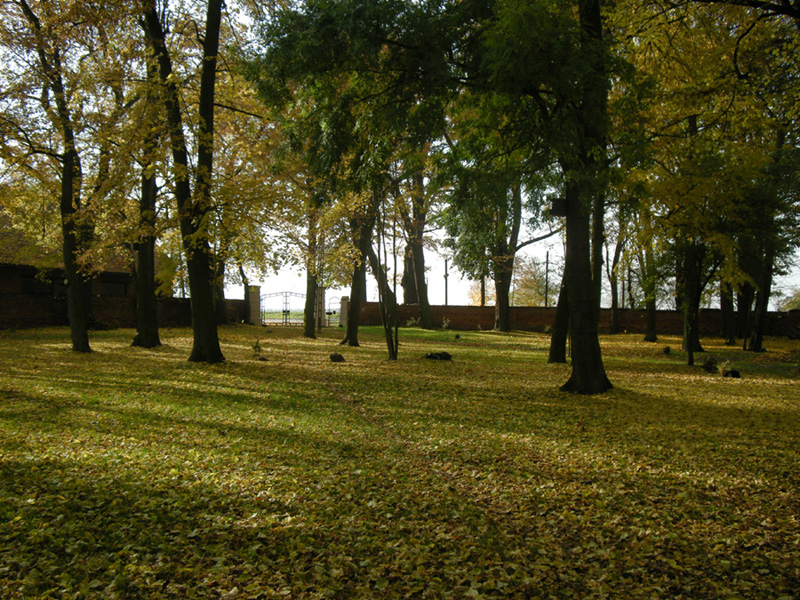
Ziemiełowice Palace English landscape garden
