= St. Lawrence's Church, Woskowice Małe =

Coordinates: 51.0607°N 17.5152°E

St. Lawrence's Church
- Kościół św. Wawrzyńca w Laskowicach
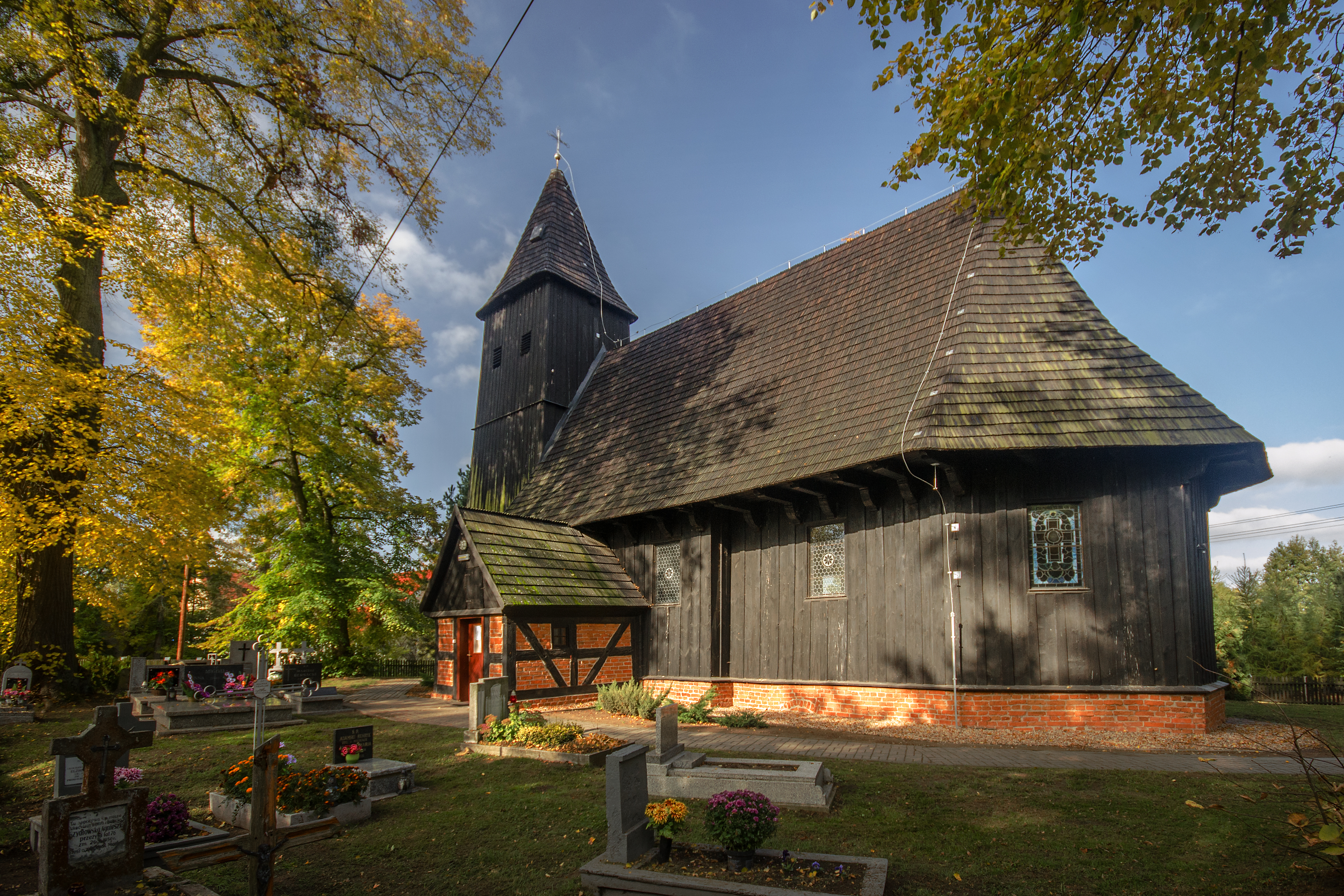
- St. Lawrence's Church
- St. Lawrence's Church
- Location: Woskowice Małe
- Country: Poland
- Denomination: Roman Catholic

Architecture
- Completed: 1711

Specifications
- Materials: Wood

Administration
- Diocese: Roman Catholic Diocese of Opole
- Parish: Parafia św. Wawrzyńca w Woskowicach Małych

St. Lawrence's Church is a historic, wooden parish church in Woskowice Małe, Namysłów County in Poland.

The church was built in 1711. Restored between 1888–1889 and 1914 (during which time a polychrome by J. Langer was discovered). The shrine was renovated in 1969.
