= Zabka =

Zabka may refer to:

- Żabka, Opole Voivodeship, a village in south-western Poland
- Żabka, a Polish chain of convenience stores
- Zabka, a genus of jumping spiders

== People ==
- Boris Žabka (born 1977), Slovak ice hockey coach
- Marek Michał Żabka (born 1955), Polish arachnologist (zoological abbreviation: Zabka)
- Stanley Zabka (1924–2023), American songwriter, filmmaker, and television director,
- William Zabka (born 1965), American actor
