= Michelsdorf =

The German name Michelsdorf can refer to:

- Ciceu-Mihăiești in Romania
- Michelsdorf, a district of Cham, Germany
- Miszkowice, Kamienna Góra County, Lower Silesian Voivodeship, in south-western Poland
- Michałkowa, Wałbrzych County, Lower Silesian Voivodeship, in south-western Poland
- Michalice, Namysłów County, Opole Voivodeship, in south-western Poland
- Michelsdorf, the former German name for the village of Sânmihai de Pădure, located within the commune Beica de Jos, Mureș County, Transylvania, Romania
- Veliká Ves (Chomutov District) in Czech Republic
