= Zaba =

Zaba may refer to:

== Places ==
- Zaba, a location given by Ptolemy in ancient Southeast Asia
- Zaba, Democratic Republic of the Congo
- Żaba, Opole Voivodeship, Poland

== Other ==
- Zaba (surname)
- acronym of Zainal Abidin bin Ahmad, Malaysian linguist and writer
- Zaba, a Croatian contraction of the Zagreb Bank (Zagrebačka banka)
- Zabasearch.com, a personal-information search engine
- Zaba (album), a 2014 album by Glass Animals
- ZABA, an acronym for Zine El Abidine Ben Ali, a former president of Tunisia
