= Krasowice =

- Village
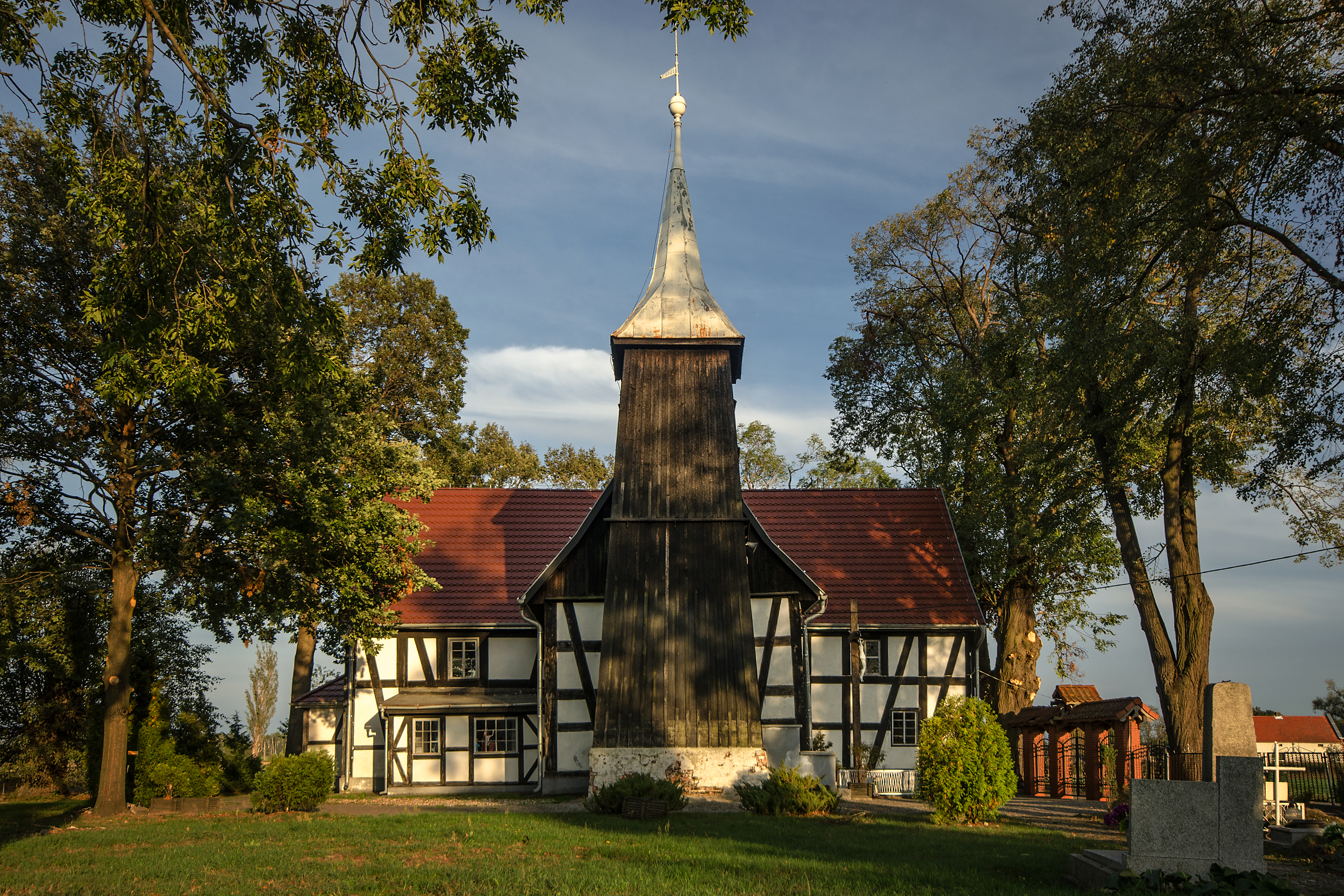

- Location within Poland
- Coordinates: 51°5′N 17°36′E
- Country: Poland
- Voivodeship: Opole
- County: Namysłów
- Gmina: Namysłów

Krasowice [krasɔˈvit͡sɛ] (German Kraschen) is a village in the administrative district of Gmina Namysłów, within Namysłów County, Opole Voivodeship, in south-western Poland.
