= Krzywa Góra, Opole Voivodeship =

Krzywa Góra
- Village
- Location within Poland
- Coordinates: 50°51′57″N 17°52′33″E
- Country: Poland
- Voivodeship: Opole
- County: Namysłów
- Gmina: Pokój
- Time zone: UTC+1 (CET)
  - Summer (DST): UTC+2 (CEST)
- Vehicle registration: ONA

Krzywa Góra ([ˈkʂɨva ˈɡura]; German: Blumenthal) is a village in the administrative district of Gmina Pokój, within Namysłów County, Opole Voivodeship, in south-western Poland.

== History ==
The village dates back to the Middle Ages, when it was part of Piast-ruled Poland. Its name is of Polish origin, in Old Polish it was known as Krziwogura or Krziwogóra. It was the location of a medieval motte-and-bailey castle from the 14th century, which is now an archaeological site. In the 18th century, the village was annexed by Prussia, and from 1871 to 1945 it was also part of Germany, before it became again part of Poland following Germany's defeat in World War II.
