= Pawłowice Namysłowskie =

- Village
- Location within Poland
- Coordinates: 51°9′25″N 17°42′25″E
- Country: Poland
- Voivodeship: Opole
- County: Namysłów
- Gmina: Namysłów

Pawłowice Namysłowskie [pavwɔˈvit͡sɛ namɨˈswɔfskʲɛ] (German Paulsdorf) is a village in the administrative district of Gmina Namysłów, within Namysłów County, Opole Voivodeship, in south-western Poland.
