= Ładza =

- Village
- Location within Poland
- Coordinates: 50°51′N 17°53′E
- Country: Poland
- Voivodeship: Opole
- County: Namysłów
- Gmina: Pokój

Ładza ([ˈwad͡za]; German: Salzbrunn) is a village in the administrative district of Gmina Pokój, within Namysłów County, Opole Voivodeship, in south-western Poland.
