= Marysin, Opole Voivodeship =

Marysin
- Village
- Location within Poland
- Coordinates: 51°06′54″N 17°48′07″E
- Country: Poland
- Voivodeship: Opole
- County: Namysłów
- Gmina: Namysłów

Marysin [maˈrɨɕin] is a village in the administrative district of Gmina Namysłów, within Namysłów County, Opole Voivodeship, in south-western Poland.
