= Reichen =

- Lobet Gott in seinen Reichen, BWV 11 ("Praise God in his kingdom")
- (Richard Allen) "Reichen" Lehmkuhl (born 1973), an American reality show winner, model
- Jürgen Reichen

Place names

- German name of Rychlik, Lubusz Voivodeship
- German name of Rychnów, Opole Voivodeship
