= Kopalina, Gmina Domaszowice =

Kopalina
- Village
- Location within Poland
- Coordinates: 51°02′14″N 17°49′16″E
- Country: Poland
- Voivodeship: Opole
- County: Namysłów
- Gmina: Domaszowice

Kopalina [kɔpaˈlina] is a village in the administrative district of Gmina Domaszowice, within Namysłów County, Opole Voivodeship, in south-western Poland.
