= Kopalina, Gmina Pokój =

Kopalina
- Village
- Location within Poland
- Coordinates: 50°58′27″N 17°55′57″E
- Country: Poland
- Voivodeship: Opole
- County: Namysłów
- Gmina: Pokój

Kopalina ([kɔpaˈlina]; German: Kopaline, 1936–45 Winterberg) is a village in the administrative district of Gmina Pokój, within Namysłów County, Opole Voivodeship, in south-western Poland.
