= Fałkowice, Opole Voivodeship =

Fałkowice
- Village
- Location within Poland
- Coordinates: 50°57′55″N 17°52′09″E
- Country: Poland
- Voivodeship: Opole
- County: Namysłów
- Gmina: Pokój

Fałkowice ([fau̯kɔˈvit͡sɛ]; German: Falkowitz, 1936–45 Falkendorf) is a village in the administrative district of Gmina Pokój, within Namysłów County, Opole Voivodeship, in south-western Poland.
