= Żabiniec, Namysłów County =

Żabiniec
- Village
- Location within Poland
- Coordinates: 50°56′22″N 17°51′2″E
- Country: Poland
- Voivodeship: Opole
- County: Namysłów
- Gmina: Pokój

Żabiniec [ʐaˈbiɲɛt͡s] is a village in the administrative district of Gmina Pokój, within Namysłów County, Opole Voivodeship, in south-western Poland.
