= Zofijówka, Opole Voivodeship =

Zofijówka
- Village
- Location within Poland
- Coordinates: 51°01′08″N 17°53′30″E
- Country: Poland
- Voivodeship: Opole
- County: Namysłów
- Gmina: Domaszowice

Zofijówka [zɔfiˈjufka] is a village in the administrative district of Gmina Domaszowice, within Namysłów County, Opole Voivodeship, in south-western Poland.
