= Nowa Wieś, Namysłów County =

Nowa Wieś
- Village
- Location within Poland
- Coordinates: 51°1′14″N 17°54′54″E
- Country: Poland
- Voivodeship: Opole
- County: Namysłów
- Gmina: Domaszowice

Nowa Wieś [ˈnɔva ˈvjɛɕ] is a village in the administrative district of Gmina Domaszowice, within Namysłów County, Opole Voivodeship, in south-western Poland.
