= Staszków =

- Village
- Location within Poland
- Coordinates: 51°05′23″N 17°45′57″E
- Country: Poland
- Voivodeship: Opole
- County: Namysłów
- Gmina: Namysłów

Staszków [ˈstaʂkuf] is a village in the administrative district of Gmina Namysłów, within Namysłów County, Opole Voivodeship, in south-western Poland.
