= Domaradz =

Domaradz may refer to the following places:

- Domaradz, Opole Voivodeship (south-west Poland)
- Domaradz, Pomeranian Voivodeship (north Poland)
- Domaradz, Subcarpathian Voivodeship (south-east Poland)
- Domaradz, West Pomeranian Voivodeship (north-west Poland)
