= Przeczów, Opole Voivodeship =

Przeczów
- Village
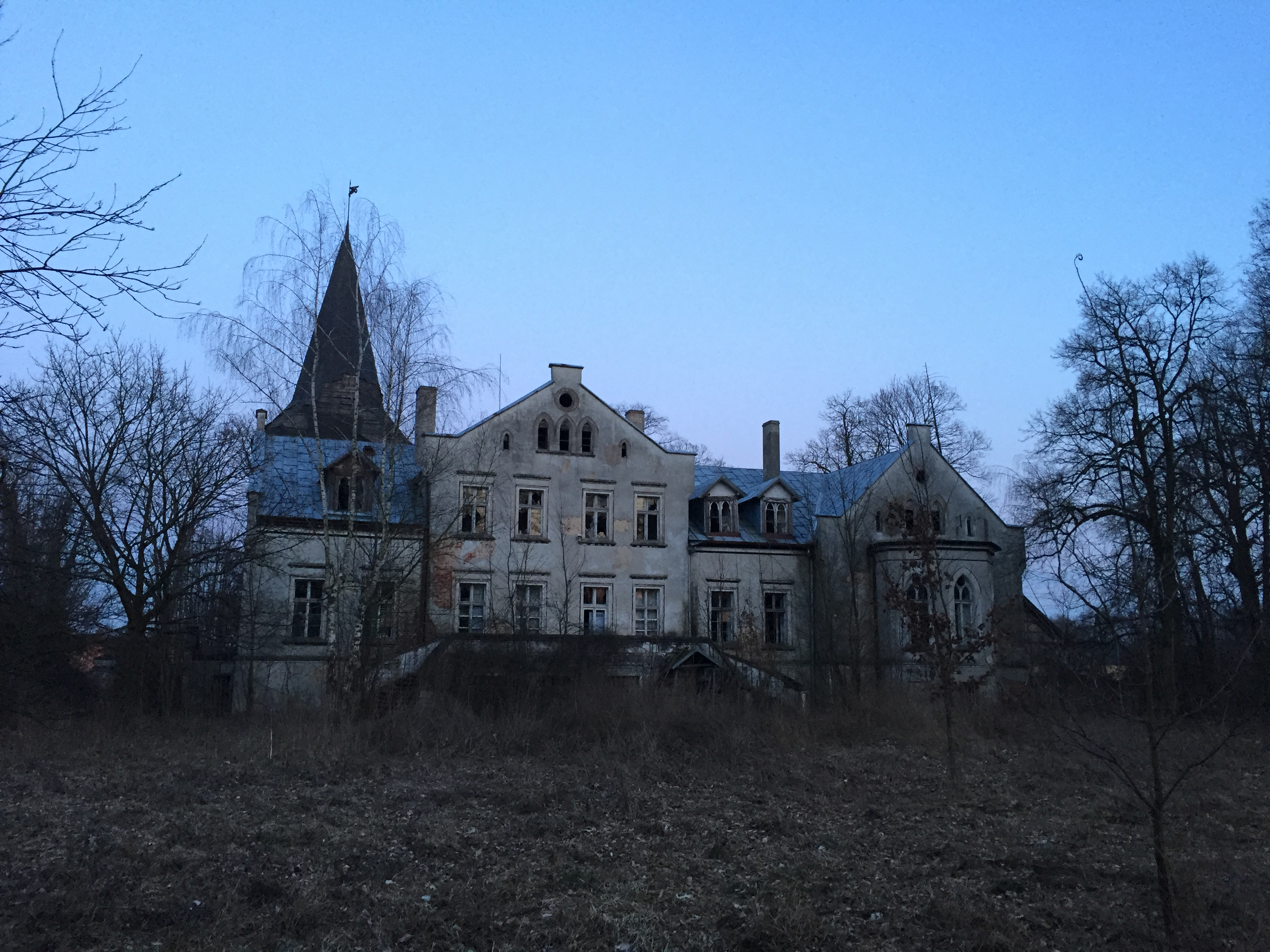

- Location within Poland
- Coordinates: 51°3′N 17°33′E
- Country: Poland
- Voivodeship: Opole
- County: Namysłów
- Gmina: Namysłów

Przeczów [ˈpʂɛt͡ʂuf] (German Prietzen) is a village in the administrative district of Gmina Namysłów, within Namysłów County, Opole Voivodeship, in south-western Poland.
