= Krogulna =

- Village
- Location within Poland
- Coordinates: 50°56′N 17°49′E
- Country: Poland
- Voivodeship: Opole
- County: Namysłów
- Gmina: Pokój
- Time zone: UTC+1 (CET)
  - Summer (DST): UTC+2 (CEST)
- Vehicle registration: ONA

Krogulna ([krɔˈɡulna]; German: Krogullno; Silesian: Krogulno) is a village in the administrative district of Gmina Pokój, within Namysłów County, Opole Voivodeship, in southern Poland.

The name of the village is of Polish origin and comes from the word krogulec, which means "sparrowhawk".
