= Piekło, Opole Voivodeship =

Piekło
- Village
- Location within Poland
- Coordinates: 51°01′41″N 17°54′51″E
- Country: Poland
- Voivodeship: Opole
- County: Namysłów
- Gmina: Domaszowice

Piekło [ˈpjɛkwɔ] (German: Pieklo) is a village in the administrative district of Gmina Domaszowice, within Namysłów County, Opole Voivodeship, in south-western Poland.
