= Igłowice =

- Village
- Location within Poland
- Coordinates: 51°06′53″N 17°49′39″E
- Country: Poland
- Voivodeship: Opole
- County: Namysłów
- Gmina: Namysłów

Igłowice [iɡwɔˈvit͡sɛ] (German Haugendorf) is a village in the administrative district of Gmina Namysłów, within Namysłów County, Opole Voivodeship, in south-western Poland.
