= Strzelce, Opole Voivodeship =

Strzelce
- Village
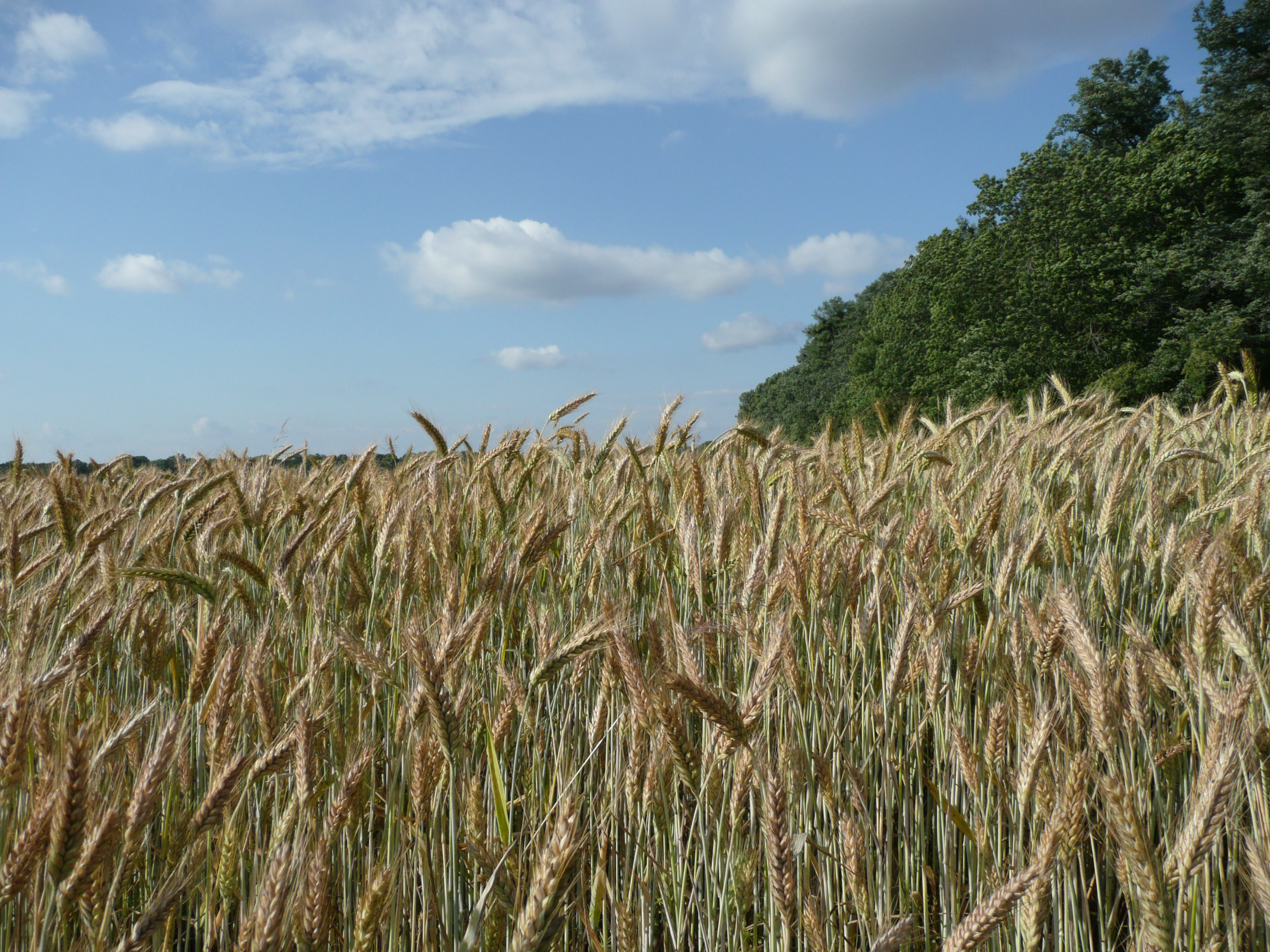

- Location within Poland
- Coordinates: 51°4′N 17°51′E
- Country: Poland
- Voivodeship: Opole
- County: Namysłów
- Gmina: Domaszowice
- Time zone: UTC+1 (CET)
  - Summer (DST): UTC+2 (CEST)
- Vehicle registration: ONA

Strzelce [ˈstʂɛlt͡sɛ] is a village in the administrative district of Gmina Domaszowice, within Namysłów County, Opole Voivodeship, in south-western Poland.

== History ==
The name of the village is of Polish origin and comes from the old Polish word strzelec, which means "hunter" or "archer". The local parish church was established probably in the 13th century. In the past, the village was divided into three parts. In 1885, all three parts combined had a population of 1,229.
