= Gręboszów, Opole Voivodeship =

Gręboszów
- Village
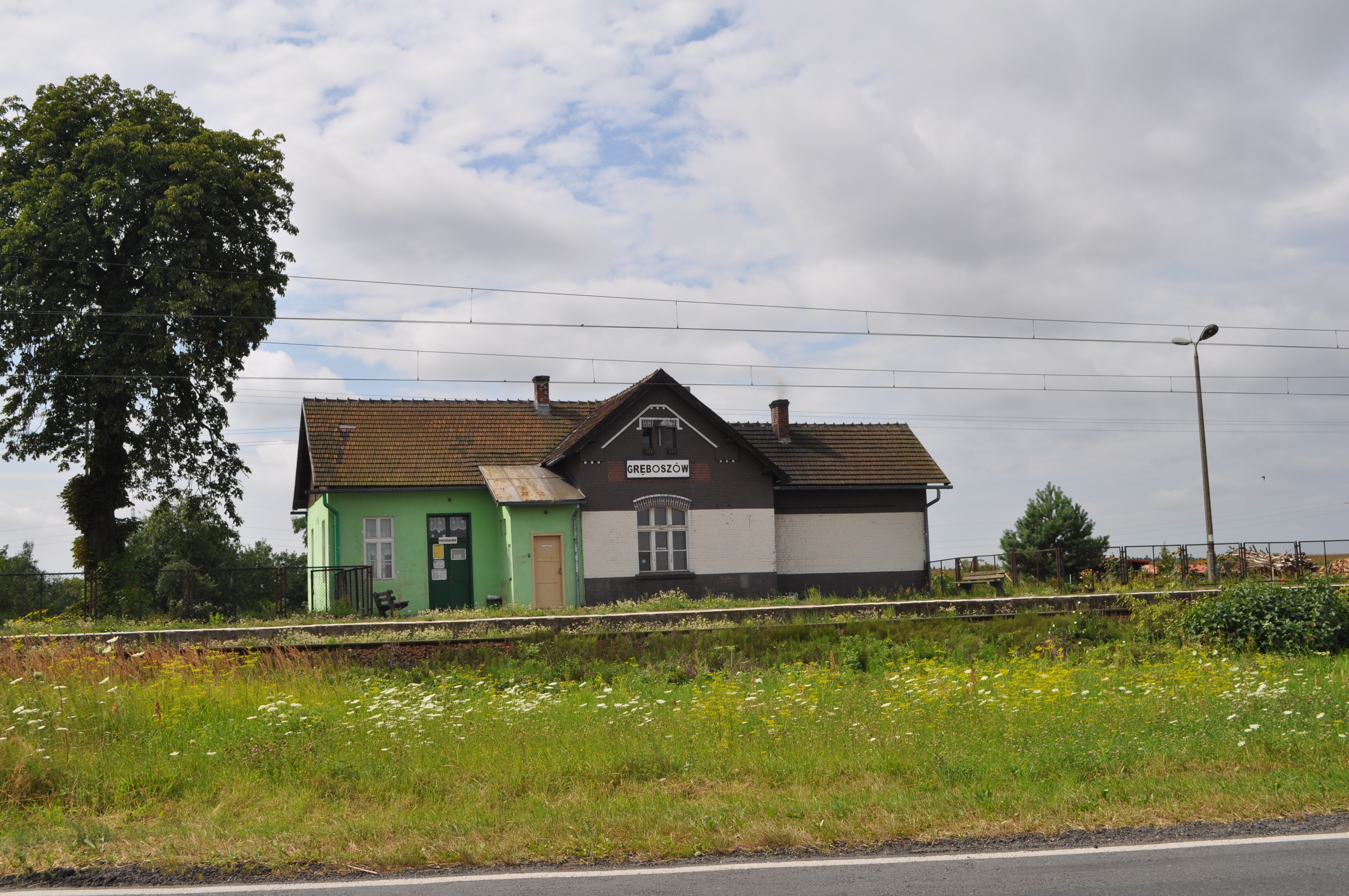
- Gręboszów train stop

- Location within Poland
- Coordinates: 51°3′19″N 17°48′21″E
- Country: Poland
- Voivodeship: Opole
- County: Namysłów
- Gmina: Domaszowice

Gręboszów [ɡrɛmˈbɔʂuf] is a village in the administrative district of Gmina Domaszowice, within Namysłów County, Opole Voivodeship, in south-western Poland.
