= Smarchowice Wielkie =

- Village
- Location within Poland
- Coordinates: 51°3′N 17°41′E
- Country: Poland
- Voivodeship: Opole
- County: Namysłów
- Gmina: Namysłów

Smarchowice Wielkie [smarxɔˈvit͡sɛ ˈvjɛlkʲɛ] is a village in the administrative district of Gmina Namysłów, within Namysłów County, Opole Voivodeship, in south-western Poland.
