= Włochy, Opole Voivodeship =

Włochy
- Village
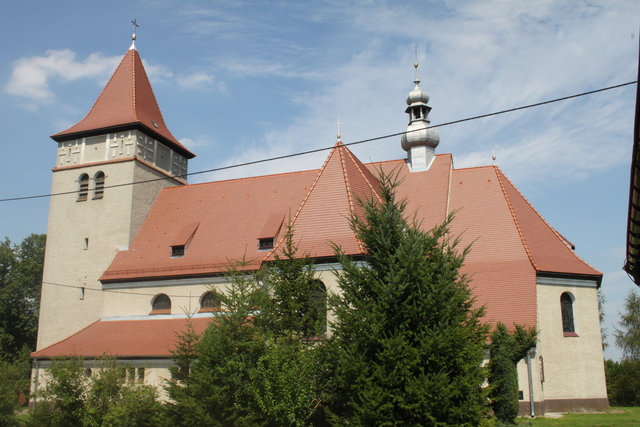
- Church of the Assumption in Włochy

- Location within Poland
- Coordinates: 51°3′N 17°56′E
- Country: Poland
- Voivodeship: Opole
- County: Namysłów
- Gmina: Domaszowice

Włochy [ˈvwɔxɨ] is a village in the administrative district of Gmina Domaszowice, within Namysłów County, Opole Voivodeship, in south-western Poland.
