= Karolówka, Opole Voivodeship =

Karolówka
- Village
- Location within Poland
- Coordinates: 51°00′33″N 17°41′26″E
- Country: Poland
- Voivodeship: Opole
- County: Namysłów
- Gmina: Namysłów

Karolówka [karɔˈlufka] is a village in the administrative district of Gmina Namysłów, within Namysłów County, Opole Voivodeship, in south-western Poland.
