= List of German Democratic Republic national rugby union team results =

The national rugby union team of the former East Germany played its first rugby international in 1951 against Romania. It never played in a Rugby World Cup, not being invited to the inaugural 1987 edition, the only one held while East Germany was in existence. The team played its last match in 1990, before merging with the West German rugby union team to form a single team representing all of Germany. In its 40-year history, the East German team never played its West German counterpart in a rugby test match.

This is a list of games played by the East German team against other nations.

== Internationals ==
This list is most likely incomplete.

=== Overview ===
Internationals
Country	First Played	Games	Won	Drew	Lost
Romania	1951	14	0	1	13
Czechoslovakia	1956	16	3	2	11
Netherlands	1958	1	1	0	0
Poland	1958	13	2	1	10
Sweden	1964	3	3	0	0
Denmark	1964	2	2	0	0
Bulgaria	1976	14	9	0	5
Soviet Union	1978	2	0	0	2
Yugoslavia	1978	1	0	0	1
Hungary	1990	1	1	0	0
Luxembourg	1990	1	0	0	1
**Overall**		**68**	**21**	**4**	**43**

=== 1950s ===
Date	Location	Opposition	Result	Tournament
21 October 1951	Bucharest	Romania	26-64	Friendly
11 May 1952	**Berlin**	Romania	11-46	Friendly
14 May 1952	**Hennigsdorf**	Romania	3-34	Friendly
12 May 1954	Gottwaldov	Czechoslovakia	6-26	Friendly
15 May 1954	Kladno	Czechoslovakia	11-44	Friendly
14 October 1958	**Brandenburg**	Romania	5-5	Friendly
1958	Brussels	Netherlands	**32-6**	Friendly
1958	Warsaw	Poland	**11-3**	Friendly
19 May 1959	Bucharest	Romania	6-21	Victory Cup
21 May 1959	Bucharest	Czechoslovakia	0-22	Victory Cup
27 September 1959	Bucharest	Romania	6-38	Friendly

=== 1960s ===
Date	Location	Opposition	Result	Tournament
22 April 1960	**Zwickau**	Czechoslovakia	0-9	Friendly
14 May 1960	**Pirna**	Romania	0-5	Victory Cup
24 May 1961	Prague	Czechoslovakia	0-8	Peace Cup
26 May 1961	Brno	Romania	0-33	Peace Cup
27 May 1961	Brno	Poland	**3-0**	Peace Cup
5 November 1961	Bucharest	Romania	0-27	Friendly
25 May 1962	Siedlice	Romania	5-28	Peace Cup
22 May 1963	Bârlad	Romania	0-15	Peace Cup
24 May 1964	**Görlitz**	Romania	6-28	Peace Cup
15 August 1964	Malmö	Denmark	**15-13**	Friendly
16 August 1964	Malmö	Sweden	**28-0**	Friendly
1964	Malmö	Poland	6-6	Friendly
3 October 1965	**Zehdenick**	Sweden	**18-5**	Friendly

=== 1970s ===
Date	Location	Opposition	Result	Tournament
1971	**Grimma**	Poland	6-27	Friendly
27 October 1972	**Rostock**	Denmark	**20-12**	Friendly
20 April 1973	**Berlin**	Sweden	**22-12**	Friendly
23 June 1973	Šumperk	Czechoslovakia	6-44	Friendly
1973	**Dresden**	Poland	0-16	Friendly
18 September 1974	Albena	Romania	0-49	Akena Trophy
13 October 1974	**Potsdam**	Czechoslovakia	6-16	Friendly
1975	**Berlin**	Poland	6-27	Friendly
13 June 1976	Prague	Czechoslovakia	0-54	Friendly
1976	**Potsdam**	Bulgaria	**6-0**	Friendly
1978	Varna	Bulgaria	0-10	Friendly
1978	Varna	Soviet Union	3-46	Friendly
1978	Varna	Yugoslavia	11-15	Friendly
1979	Nesebar	Bulgaria	5-14	Friendly
1979	Nesebar	Romania	0-60	Friendly
1979	Nesebar	Poland	12-32	Friendly
1979	**Magdeburg**	Bulgaria	**8-7**	Friendly

=== 1980s ===
Date	Location	Opposition	Result	Tournament
1980	**Rathenow**	Bulgaria	**8-4**	Friendly
1980	**Brandenburg**	Bulgaria	**10-7**	Friendly
1982	**Leipzig**	Bulgaria	**6-4**	Friendly
1983	Varna	Bulgaria	6-19	Friendly
1983	Varna	Poland	3-30	Friendly
6 May 1984	Varna	Soviet Union	3-51	Friendly
1984	**Werder**	Bulgaria	**12-6**	Friendly
1984	**Falkensee**	Bulgaria	**9-6**	Friendly
1986	Sozopol	Bulgaria	0-16	Friendly
1986	Sozopol	Poland	6-15	Friendly
1987	**Cottbus**	Bulgaria	**14-6**	Friendly
1988	Sofia	Bulgaria	0-3	Friendly
1988	Starogard	Poland	3-22	Friendly
16 June 1988		Soviet Union	3-56	Friendly
1989	**Falkensee**	Bulgaria	**10-3**	Friendly
1989	**Leipzig**	Poland	0-44	Friendly

=== 1990s ===
Date	Location	Opposition	Result	Tournament
1 July 1990	Érd	Hungary	**7-3**	Friendly
15 September 1990	Luxembourg	Luxembourg	9-17	Friendly

- East German wins in **bold**.
- Locations of East German home games in **bold**.

== Record of international matches ==
Internationals
Country	First Played	Games	Won	Drew	Lost
Romania	1951	14	0	1	13
Czechoslovakia	1956	16	3	2	11
Netherlands	1958	1	1	0	0
Poland	1958	13	2	1	10
Sweden	1964	3	3	0	0
Denmark	1964	2	2	0	0
Bulgaria	1976	14	9	0	5
Soviet Union	1978	2	0	0	2
Yugoslavia	1978	1	0	0	1
Hungary	1990	1	1	0	0
Luxembourg	1990	1	0	0	1
Overall		68	21	4	43

== See also ==
- List of Germany national rugby union team results

== Sources ==
- East Germany international rugby results at rugbyinternational.net
- East Germany results at the IRB website
