= Grabówka, Namysłów County =

Grabówka
- Settlement
- Location within Poland
- Coordinates: 51°5′30″N 17°45′16″E
- Country: Poland
- Voivodeship: Opole
- County: Namysłów
- Gmina: Namysłów

Grabówka [ɡraˈbufka] is a settlement in the administrative district of Gmina Namysłów, within Namysłów County, Opole Voivodeship, in south-western Poland.
