= Jastrzębie, Opole Voivodeship =

Jastrzębie
- Village
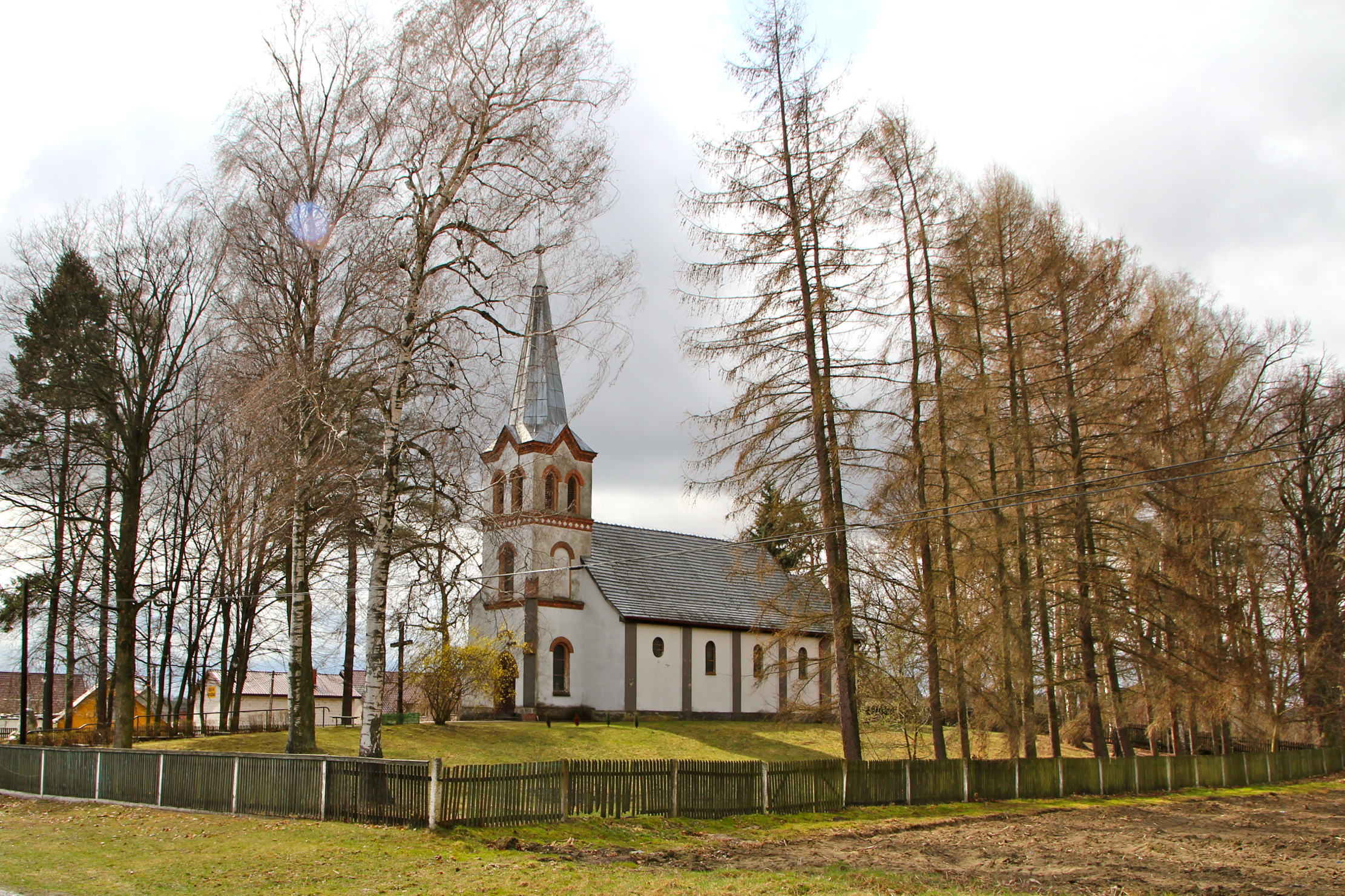

- Location within Poland
- Coordinates: 51°1′N 17°45′E
- Country: Poland
- Voivodeship: Opole
- County: Namysłów
- Gmina: Namysłów

Jastrzębie [jasˈtʂɛmbjɛ] (German Nassadel) is a village in the administrative district of Gmina Namysłów, within Namysłów County, Opole Voivodeship, in south-western Poland.
