= Piękna Studnia =

- Settlement
- Location within Poland
- Coordinates: 51°0′50″N 17°40′25″E
- Country: Poland
- Voivodeship: Opole
- County: Namysłów
- Gmina: Namysłów

Piękna Studnia (Polish pronunciation: [ˈpjɛŋkna ˈstudɲa]) is a settlement in the administrative district of Gmina Namysłów, within Namysłów County, Opole Voivodeship, in south-western Poland.
