= Jagienna =

- Village
- Location within Poland
- Coordinates: 50°55′36″N 17°51′14″E
- Country: Poland
- Voivodeship: Opole
- County: Namysłów
- Gmina: Pokój

Jagienna [jaˈɡʲɛnna] is a village in the administrative district of Gmina Pokój, within Namysłów County, Opole Voivodeship, in south-western Poland.
