= Lampersdorf =

Lampersdorf may refer to the following places:

- in the Czech Republic:
  - Lampersdorf, the German name for Lampertice, a village in Trutnov District
- in Poland:
  - Lampersdorf, the German name for Grodziszcze, Ząbkowice County, a village in Ząbkowice County
  - Lampersdorf, the German name for Mikowice, Opole Voivodeship, a village in Namysłów County
  - Lampersdorf, the German name for Zaborów, Lower Silesian Voivodeship, a village in Lubin County
