= Minkowskie =

- Village
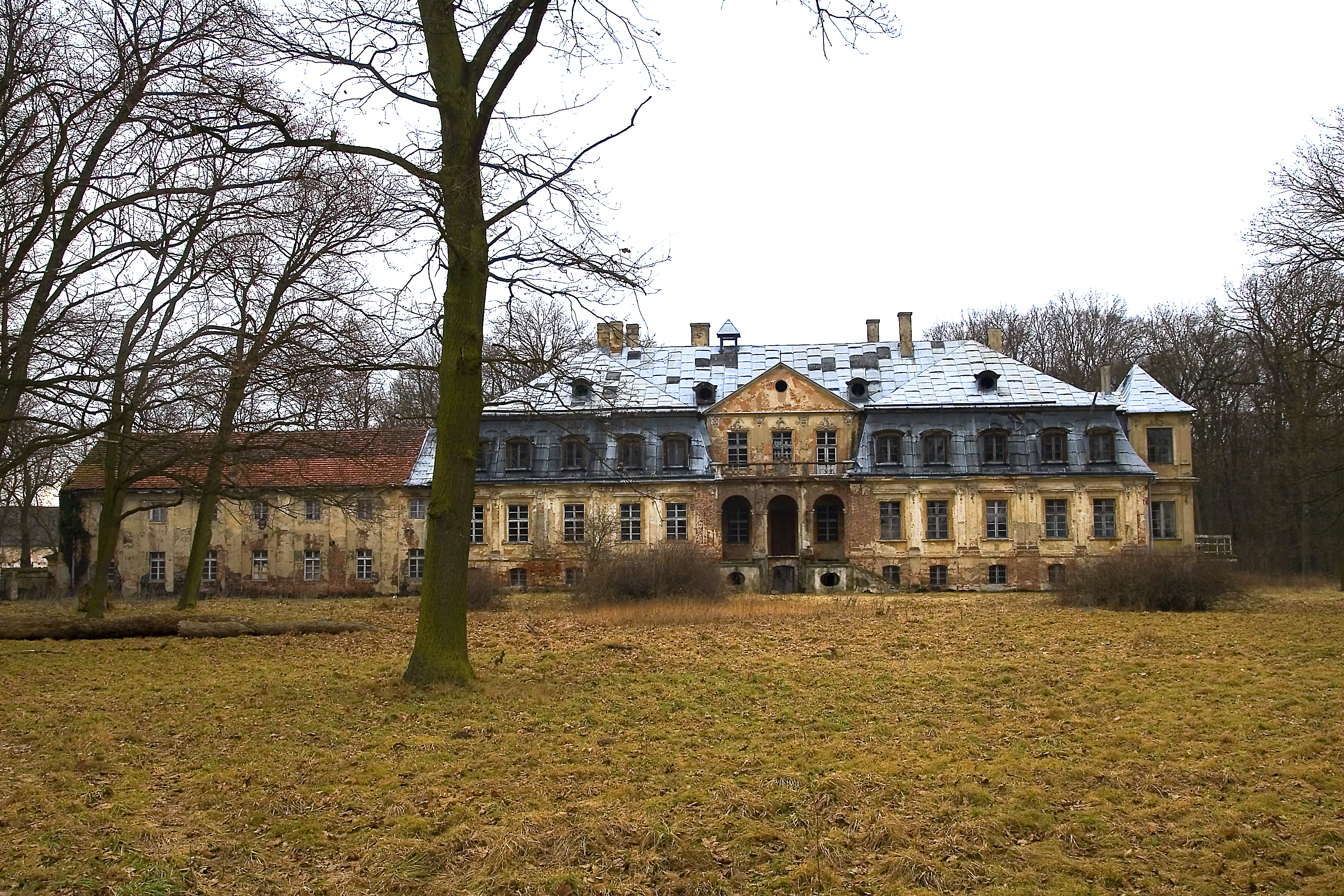
- Seydlitz Palace

- Location within Poland
- Coordinates: 50°59′N 17°36′E
- Country: Poland
- Voivodeship: Opole
- County: Namysłów
- Gmina: Namysłów
- Population: 440

Minkowskie [minˈkɔfskʲɛ] is a village in the administrative district of Gmina Namysłów, within Namysłów County, Opole Voivodeship, in south-western Poland.
