= Paryż, Opole Voivodeship =

Paryż
- Village
- Location within Poland
- Coordinates: 50°56′47″N 17°53′56″E
- Country: Poland
- Voivodeship: Opole
- County: Namysłów
- Gmina: Pokój

Paryż [ˈparɨʂ] is a village in the administrative district of Gmina Pokój, within Namysłów County, Opole Voivodeship, in south-western Poland.
