= Nowy Folwark, Opole Voivodeship =

Nowy Folwark
- Village
- Location within Poland
- Coordinates: 51°00′14″N 17°44′27″E
- Country: Poland
- Voivodeship: Opole
- County: Namysłów
- Gmina: Namysłów

Nowy Folwark [ˈnɔvɨ ˈfɔlvark] (German Sandvorwerk) is a village in the administrative district of Gmina Namysłów, within Namysłów County, Opole Voivodeship, in south-western Poland.

== See also ==
- Vorwerk (fortification)
