= Sułoszów =

- Village
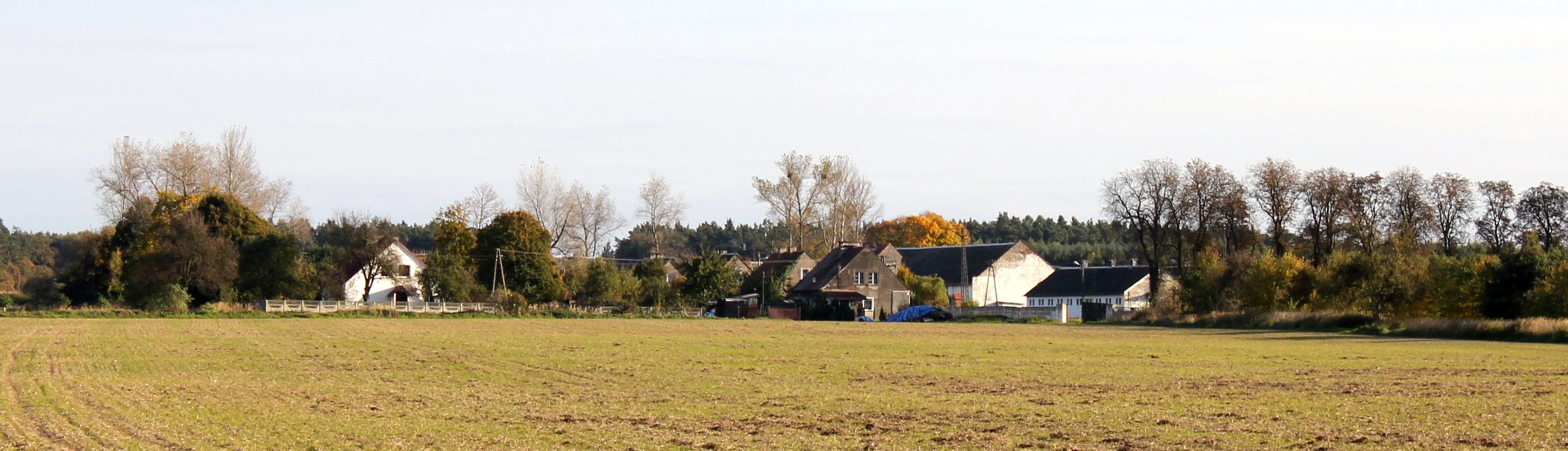

- Location within Poland
- Coordinates: 51°02′03″N 17°47′43″E
- Country: Poland
- Voivodeship: Opole
- County: Namysłów
- Gmina: Domaszowice

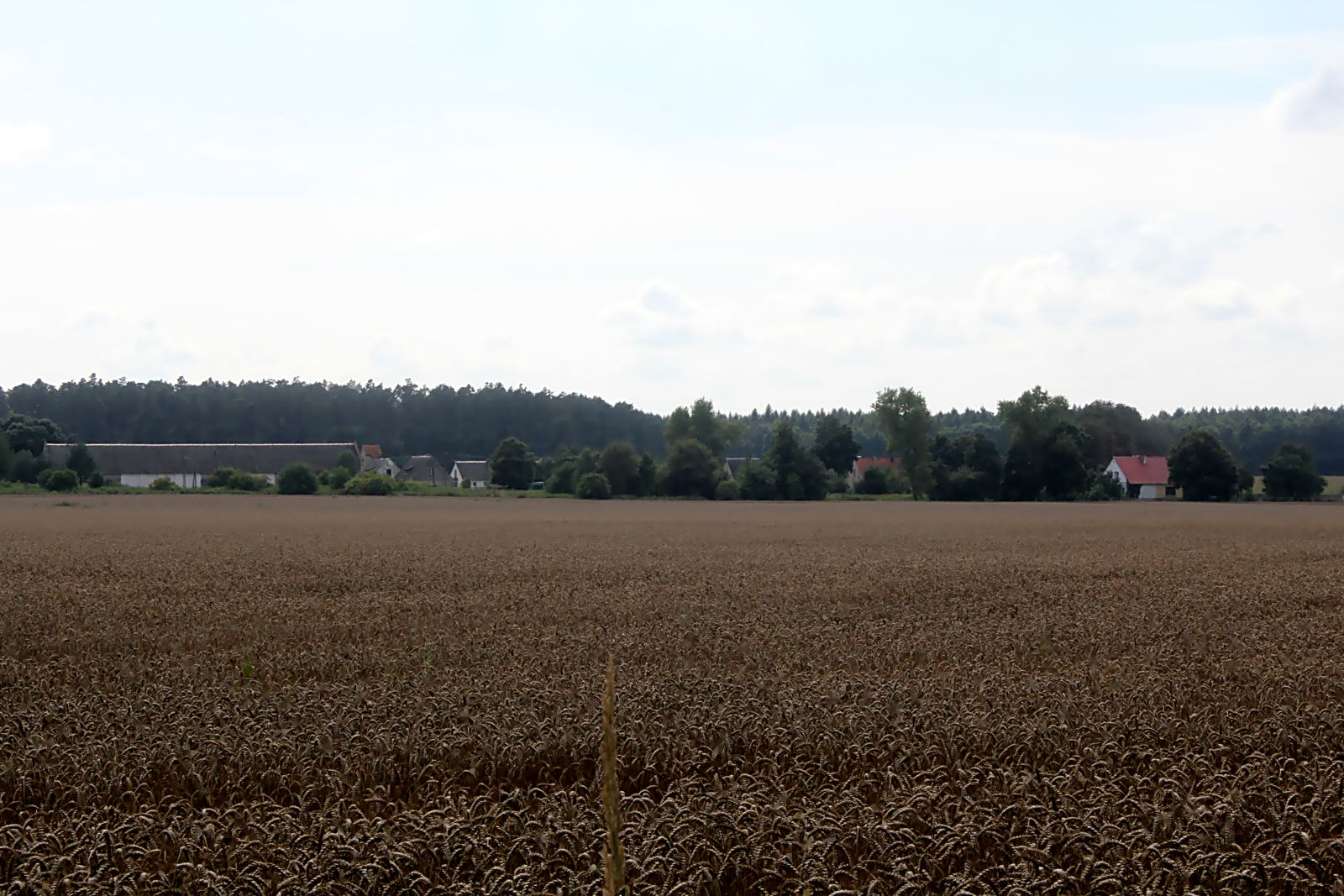
Sułoszów (Smolarka)

Sułoszów [suˈwɔʂuf] is a village in the administrative district of Gmina Domaszowice, within Namysłów County, Opole Voivodeship, in south-western Poland.
