= Baldwinowice, Opole Voivodeship =

Baldwinowice
- Village
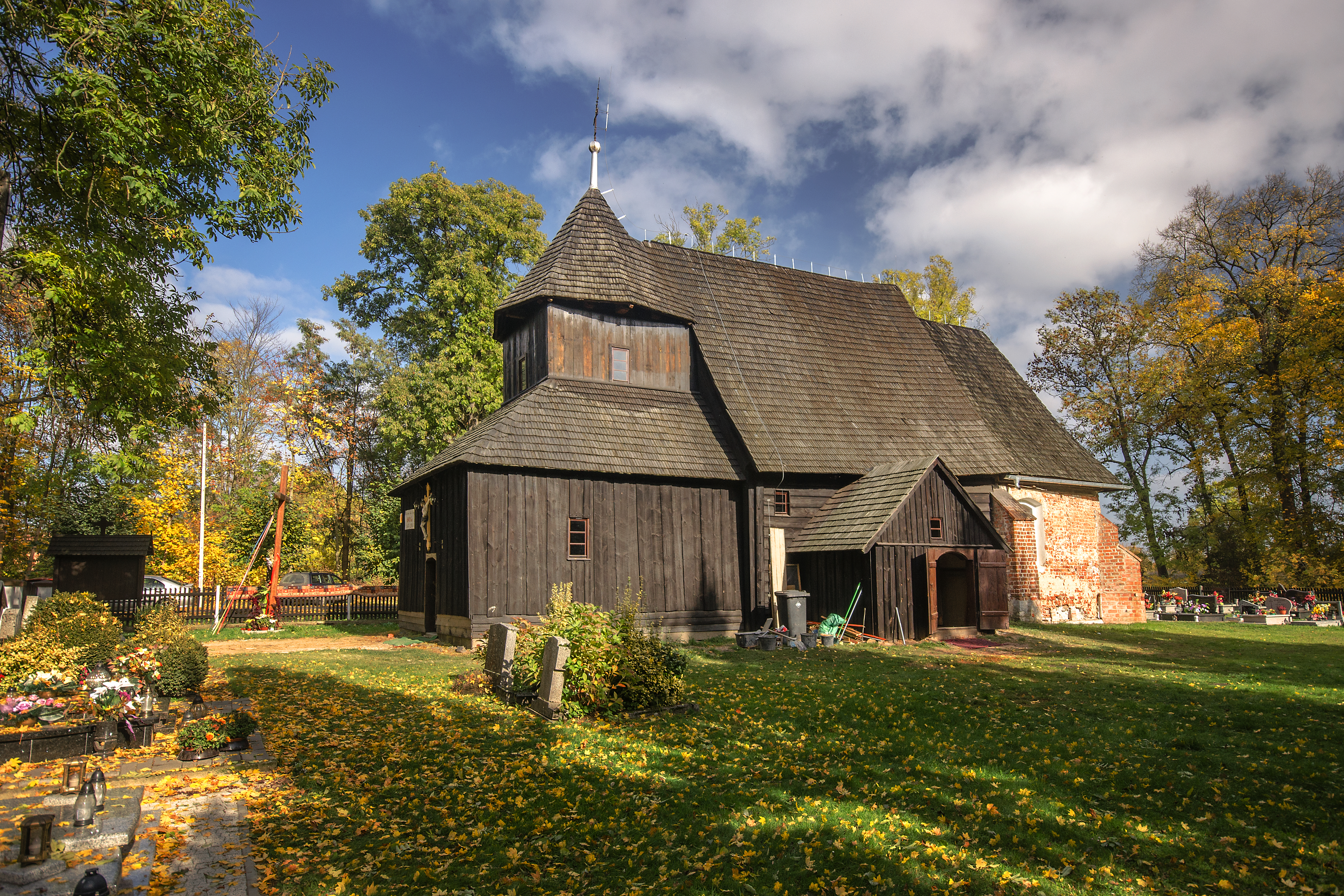

- Location within Poland
- Coordinates: 51°7′4″N 17°48′39″E
- Country: Poland
- Voivodeship: Opole
- County: Namysłów
- Gmina: Namysłów

Baldwinowice [baldvinɔˈvit͡sɛ] (German Belmsdorf) is a village in the administrative district of Gmina Namysłów, within Namysłów County, Opole Voivodeship, in south-western Poland.

== See also ==
- Holy Trinity Church, Baldwinowice
