= Nowe Smarchowice =

Village in Poland

- Village
- Location within Poland
- Coordinates: 51°01′34″N 17°40′49″E
- Country: Poland
- Voivodeship: Opole
- County: Namysłów
- Gmina: Namysłów

Nowe Smarchowice [ˈnɔvɛ smarxɔˈvit͡sɛ] (German Neu Marchwitz) is a village in the administrative district of Gmina Namysłów, within Namysłów County, Opole Voivodeship, in south-western Poland.
