= Stary Gręboszów =

- Village
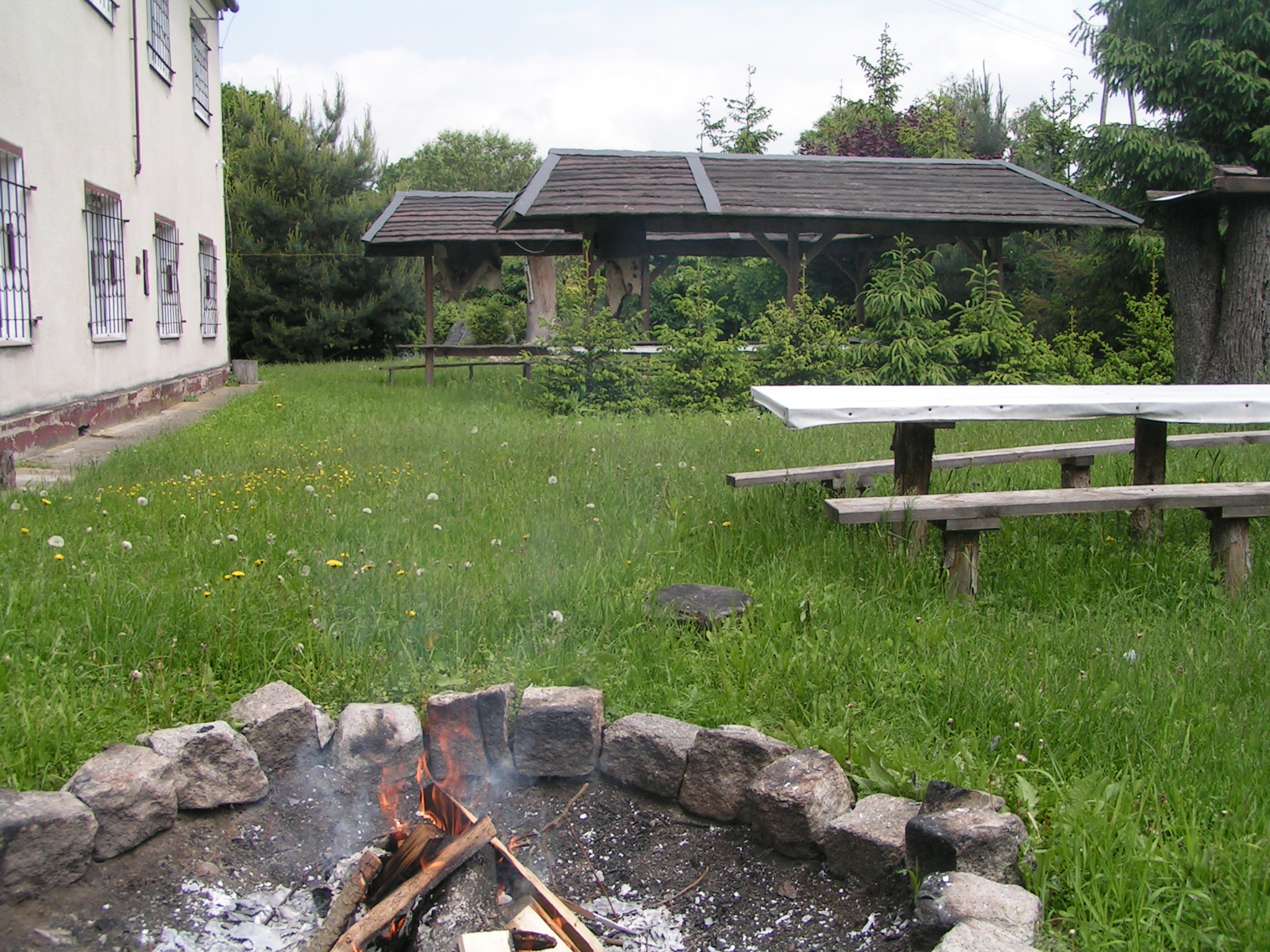
- Forester's lodge

- Location within Poland
- Coordinates: 51°02′36″N 17°46′52″E
- Country: Poland
- Voivodeship: Opole
- County: Namysłów
- Gmina: Domaszowice

Stary Gręboszów [ˈstarɨ ɡrɛmˈbɔʂuf] is a village in the administrative district of Gmina Domaszowice, within Namysłów County, Opole Voivodeship, in south-western Poland.
