= Zielony Dąb, Opole Voivodeship =

Zielony Dąb
- Village
- Location within Poland
- Coordinates: 51°01′23″N 17°41′18″E
- Country: Poland
- Voivodeship: Opole
- County: Namysłów
- Gmina: Namysłów

Zielony Dąb (Polish pronunciation: [ʑɛˈlɔnɨ ˈdɔmp]) is a village in the administrative district of Gmina Namysłów, within Namysłów County, Opole Voivodeship, in south-western Poland.
