= Hałderze =

- Village
- Location within Poland
- Coordinates: 51°2′5″N 17°41′15″E
- Country: Poland
- Voivodeship: Opole
- County: Namysłów
- Gmina: Namysłów

Hałderze [xau̯ˈdɛʐɛ] is a village in the administrative district of Gmina Namysłów, within Namysłów County, Opole Voivodeship, in south-western Poland.
