= Kozuby, Opole Voivodeship =

Kozuby
- Village
- Location within Poland
- Coordinates: 50°55′17″N 17°51′59″E
- Country: Poland
- Voivodeship: Opole
- County: Namysłów
- Gmina: Pokój

Kozuby [kɔˈzubɨ] is a village in the administrative district of Gmina Pokój, within Namysłów County, Opole Voivodeship, in south-western Poland.
