= Zalesie, Opole Voivodeship =

Zalesie
- Village
- Location within Poland
- Coordinates: 51°3′6″N 17°52′2″E
- Country: Poland
- Voivodeship: Opole
- County: Namysłów
- Gmina: Domaszowice
- Postal code: 46-146

Zalesie [zaˈlɛɕɛ] is a village in the administrative district of Gmina Domaszowice, within Namysłów County, Opole Voivodeship, in southern Poland.
