= Woskowice Górne =

- Village
- Location within Poland
- Coordinates: 51°6′N 17°54′E
- Country: Poland
- Voivodeship: Opole
- County: Namysłów
- Gmina: Domaszowice

Woskowice Górne [vɔskɔˈvit͡sɛ ˈɡurnɛ] is a village in the administrative district of Gmina Domaszowice, within Namysłów County, Opole Voivodeship, in south-western Poland.
