= Domaradzka Kuźnia =

- Village
- Location within Poland
- Coordinates: 50°57′N 17°55′E
- Country: Poland
- Voivodeship: Opole
- County: Namysłów
- Gmina: Pokój

Domaradzka Kuźnia ([dɔmaˈrat͡ska ˈkuʑɲa]; German: Dammratschhammer, 1936–45 Dammfelder Hammer; Silesian: Domoradzkŏ Kuźnia) is a village in the administrative district of Gmina Pokój, within Namysłów County, Opole Voivodeship, in south-western Poland.
