= Wielka Kolonia =

- Village
- Location within Poland
- Coordinates: 51°01′01″N 17°50′48″E
- Country: Poland
- Voivodeship: Opole
- County: Namysłów
- Gmina: Domaszowice

Wielka Kolonia [ˈvjɛlka kɔˈlɔɲa] is a village in the administrative district of Gmina Domaszowice, within Namysłów County, Opole Voivodeship, in south-western Poland.
