= Niwki, Namysłów County =

Niwki
- Village
- Location within Poland
- Coordinates: 51°03′19″N 17°33′59″E
- Country: Poland
- Voivodeship: Opole
- County: Namysłów
- Gmina: Namysłów

Niwki [ˈnifki] (German Niefe) is a village in the administrative district of Gmina Namysłów, within Namysłów County, Opole Voivodeship, in south-western Poland.
