= Bławaciska =

- Village
- Location within Poland
- Coordinates: 51°01′57″N 17°42′34″E
- Country: Poland
- Voivodeship: Opole
- County: Namysłów
- Gmina: Namysłów

Bławaciska [bwavaˈt͡ɕiska] is a village in the administrative district of Gmina Namysłów, within Namysłów County, Opole Voivodeship, in south-western Poland.
