= Brzezinka, Opole Voivodeship =

Brzezinka
- Village
- Location within Poland
- Coordinates: 51°11′8″N 17°47′59″E
- Country: Poland
- Voivodeship: Opole
- County: Namysłów
- Gmina: Namysłów

Brzezinka (Polish: [bʐɛˈʑiŋka]) is a village in the administrative district of Gmina Namysłów, within Namysłów County, Opole Voivodeship, in south-western Poland.
