= Młynek, Opole Voivodeship =

Młynek
- Settlement
- Location within Poland
- Coordinates: 51°41′07″N 17°39′08″E
- Country: Poland
- Voivodeship: Opole
- County: Namysłów
- Gmina: Namysłów

Młynek [ˈmwɨnɛk] is a settlement in the administrative district of Gmina Namysłów, within Namysłów County, Opole Voivodeship, in south-western Poland.
