= Lubnów =

Lubnów may refer to the following places in Poland:

- Lubnów, Trzebnica County in Lower Silesian Voivodeship (south-west Poland)
- Lubnów, Ząbkowice County in Lower Silesian Voivodeship (south-west Poland)
- Lubnów, Opole Voivodeship (south-west Poland)
