= Winniki, Opole Voivodeship =

Winniki
- Village
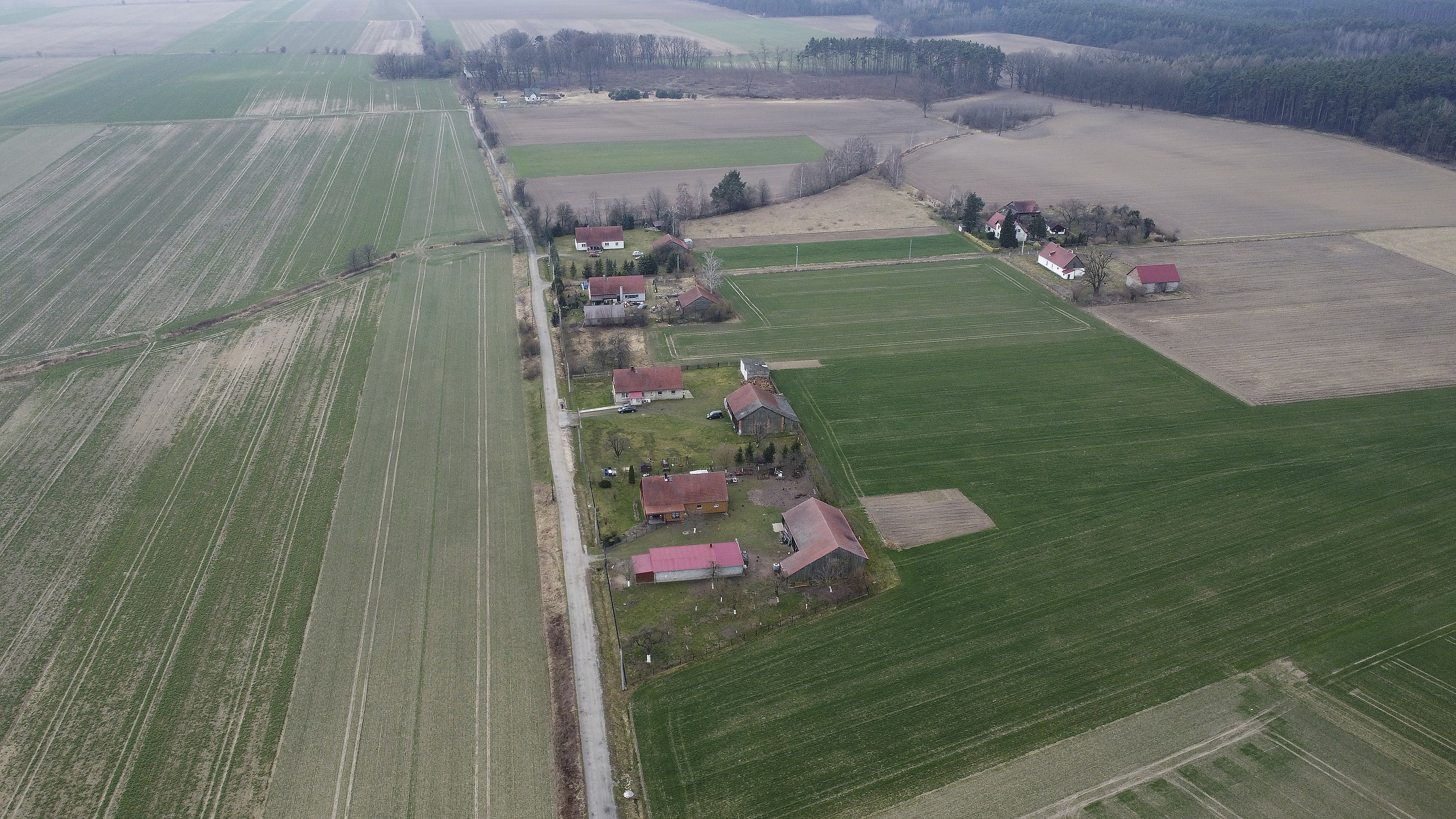
- Aerial view of Winniki

- Location within Poland
- Coordinates: 51°01′29″N 17°32′30″E
- Country: Poland
- Voivodeship: Opole
- County: Namysłów
- Gmina: Namysłów
- Time zone: UTC+1 (CET)
  - Summer (DST): UTC+2 (CEST)
- Vehicle registration: ONA

Winniki [vinˈniki] is a village in the administrative district of Gmina Namysłów, within Namysłów County, Opole Voivodeship, in south-western Poland.
