= Zawiść =

Zawiść may refer to:

- Zawiść, Opole Voivodeship (south Poland)
- Zawiść, Orzesze in Silesian Voivodeship (south Poland)
