= Nowy Dwór, Namysłów County =

Nowy Dwór
- Village
- Location within Poland
- Coordinates: 51°07′08″N 17°47′32″E
- Country: Poland
- Voivodeship: Opole
- County: Namysłów
- Gmina: Namysłów

Nowy Dwór [ˈnɔvɨ ˈdvur] is a village in the administrative district of Gmina Namysłów, within Namysłów County, Opole Voivodeship, in south-western Poland.
