= Wielołęka, Opole Voivodeship =

Wielołęka
- Village
- Location within Poland
- Coordinates: 51°01′38″N 17°54′12″E
- Country: Poland
- Voivodeship: Opole
- County: Namysłów
- Gmina: Domaszowice

Wielołęka [vjɛlɔˈwɛnka] is a village in the administrative district of Gmina Domaszowice, within Namysłów County, Opole Voivodeship, in south-western Poland.
