= Zieleniec, Opole Voivodeship =

Zieleniec
- Village
- Location within Poland
- Coordinates: 50°55′29″N 17°49′2″E
- Country: Poland
- Voivodeship: Opole
- County: Namysłów
- Gmina: Pokój
- Population: 640

Zieleniec ([ʑɛˈlɛɲɛt͡s]; German: Gründorf; Silesian: Zielyniyc) is a village in the administrative district of Gmina Pokój, within Namysłów County, Opole Voivodeship, in south-western Poland.
