= Józefków, Opole Voivodeship =

Józefków
- Village
- Location within Poland
- Coordinates: 51°06′16″N 17°45′06″E
- Country: Poland
- Voivodeship: Opole
- County: Namysłów
- Gmina: Namysłów

Józefków [juˈzɛfkuf] (German Jauchendorf) is a village in the administrative district of Gmina Namysłów, within Namysłów County, Opole Voivodeship, in south-western Poland.
