= Wszemil =

- Village
- Location within Poland
- Coordinates: 51°01′40″N 17°44′36″E
- Country: Poland
- Voivodeship: Opole
- County: Namysłów
- Gmina: Namysłów

Wszemil [ˈfʂɛmil] is a village in the administrative district of Gmina Namysłów, within Namysłów County, Opole Voivodeship, in south-western Poland.
