= Wszeradów =

- Village
- Location within Poland
- Coordinates: 51°01′20″N 17°35′49″E
- Country: Poland
- Voivodeship: Opole
- County: Namysłów
- Gmina: Namysłów

Wszeradów [fʂɛˈraduf] is a village in the administrative district of Gmina Namysłów, within Namysłów County, Opole Voivodeship, in south-western Poland.
