= Świercowskie =

- Village
- Location within Poland
- Coordinates: 50°56′59″N 17°50′26″E
- Country: Poland
- Voivodeship: Opole
- County: Namysłów
- Gmina: Pokój

Świercowskie (Polish pronunciation: [ɕfjɛrˈt͡sɔfskʲɛ]) is a village in the administrative district of Gmina Pokój, within Namysłów County, Opole Voivodeship, in south-western Poland.
