= Dąbrówka Dolna =

- Village
- Location within Poland
- Coordinates: 50°56′48″N 17°55′33″E
- Country: Poland
- Voivodeship: Opole
- County: Namysłów
- Gmina: Pokój

Dąbrówka Dolna ([dɔmˈbrufka ˈdɔlna]; German: Eichendorf; Silesian: Dolnŏ Dōmbrōwka) is a village in the administrative district of Gmina Pokój, Namysłów County, Opole Voivodeship, Poland.
