= Głuszyna, Opole Voivodeship =

Głuszyna
- Village
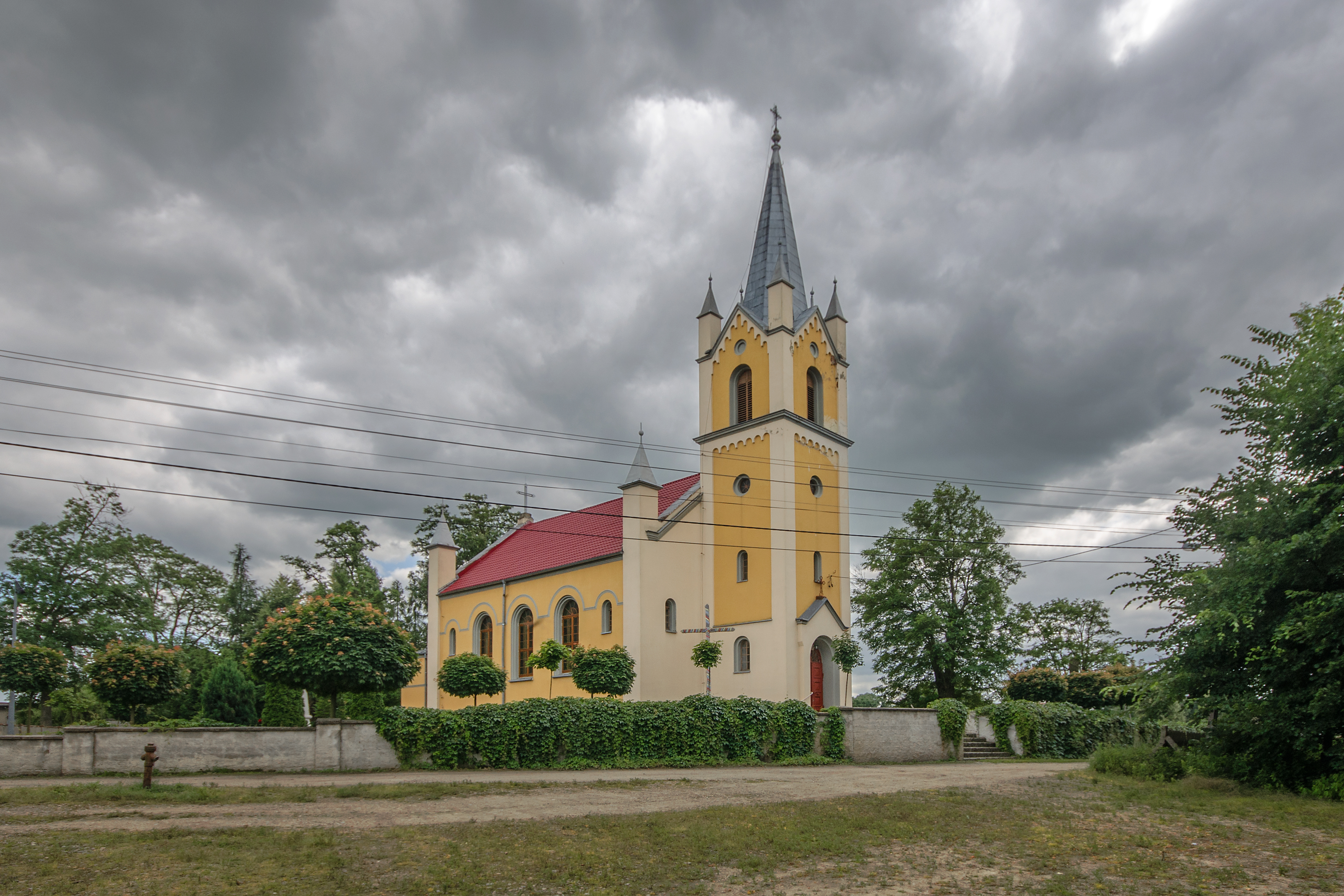
- All Saints Church

- Location within Poland
- Coordinates: 51°9′N 17°49′E
- Country: Poland
- Voivodeship: Opole
- County: Namysłów
- Gmina: Namysłów
- Time zone: UTC+1 (CET)
  - Summer (DST): UTC+2 (CEST)
- Vehicle registration: ONA

Głuszyna [ɡwuˈʂɨna] is a village in the administrative district of Gmina Namysłów, within Namysłów County, Opole Voivodeship, in southern Poland.

The name of the village is of Polish origin and comes from the word głuszec, which means "capercaillie".

== See also ==
- Agroplon Głuszyna
