= Barzyna, Opole Voivodeship =

Barzyna
- Village
- Location within Poland
- Coordinates: 51°2′21″N 17°35′14″E
- Country: Poland
- Voivodeship: Opole
- County: Namysłów
- Gmina: Namysłów

Barzyna [baˈʐɨna] (German Kleinwaltersdorf) is a village in the administrative district of Gmina Namysłów, within Namysłów County, Opole Voivodeship, in south-western Poland.
