= Żabiak =

- Settlement
- Location within Poland
- Coordinates: 51°3′55″N 17°37′24″E
- Country: Poland
- Voivodeship: Opole
- County: Namysłów
- Gmina: Namysłów

Żabiak [ˈʐabjak] is a settlement in the administrative district of Gmina Namysłów, within Namysłów County, Opole Voivodeship, in south-western Poland.
