= Bukowa Śląska =

- Village
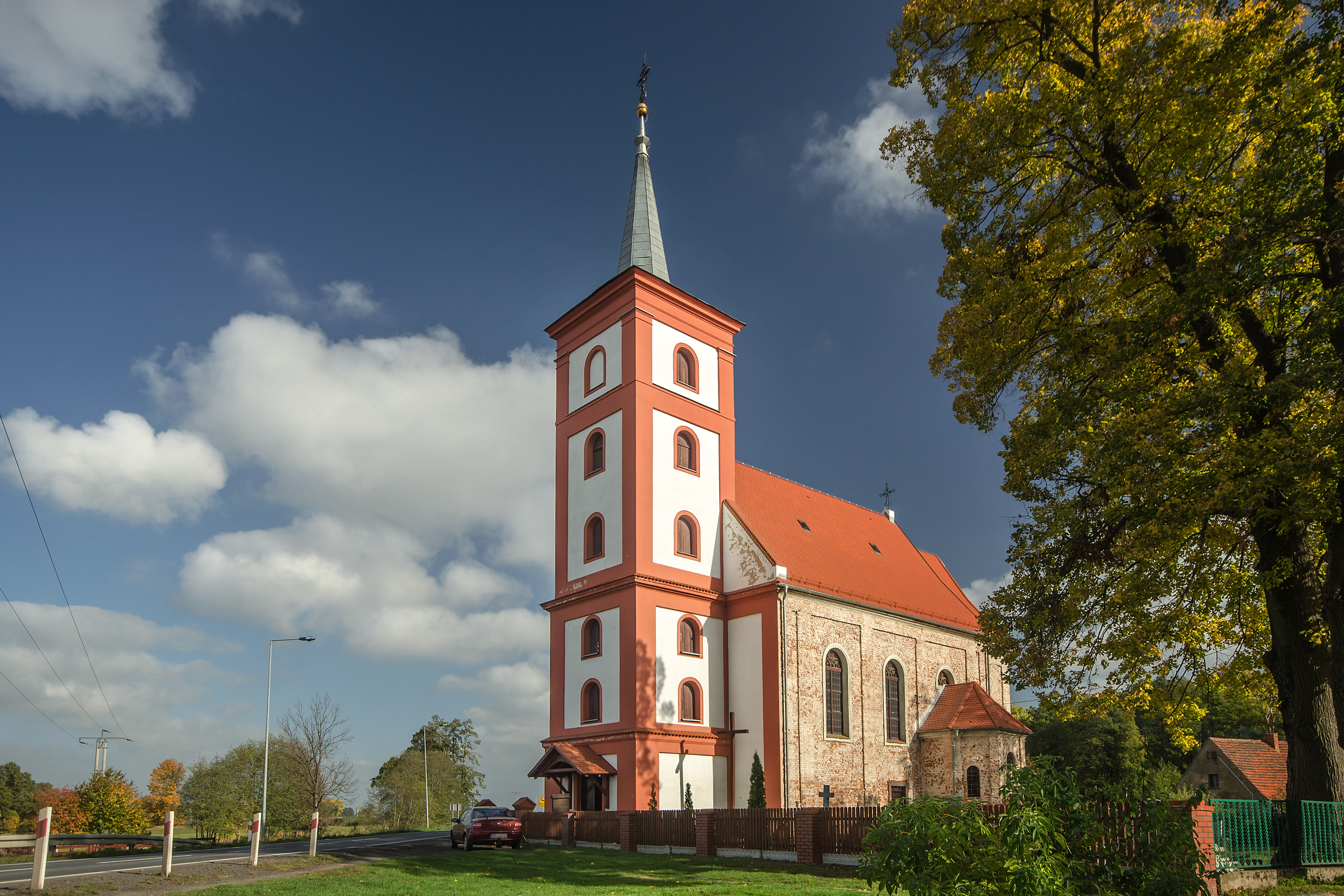
- Church of Saint James

- Location within Poland
- Coordinates: 51°6′N 17°48′E
- Country: Poland
- Voivodeship: Opole
- County: Namysłów
- Gmina: Namysłów

Bukowa Śląska [buˈkɔva ˈɕlɔ̃ska] is a village in the administrative district of Gmina Namysłów, within Namysłów County, Opole Voivodeship, in south-western Poland.
