= Smarchowice Małe =

- Village
- Location within Poland
- Coordinates: 51°6′N 17°42′E
- Country: Poland
- Voivodeship: Opole
- County: Namysłów
- Gmina: Namysłów

Smarchowice Małe [smarxɔˈvit͡sɛ ˈmawɛ] (German Deutsch Marchwitz) is a village in the administrative district of Gmina Namysłów, within Namysłów County, Opole Voivodeship, in south-western Poland.
