= Kowalowice =

- Village
- Location within Poland
- Coordinates: 51°8′N 17°46′E
- Country: Poland
- Voivodeship: Opole
- County: Namysłów
- Gmina: Namysłów

Kowalowice [kɔvalɔˈvit͡sɛ] (German Kaulwitz) is a village in the administrative district of Gmina Namysłów, within Namysłów County, Opole Voivodeship, in south-western Poland.
