= Łączany, Opole Voivodeship =

Łączany
- Village
- Location within Poland
- Coordinates: 51°03′28″N 17°45′06″E
- Country: Poland
- Voivodeship: Opole
- County: Namysłów
- Gmina: Namysłów

Łączany [wɔnˈt͡ʂanɨ] (German Lankau) is a village in the administrative district of Gmina Namysłów, within Namysłów County, Opole Voivodeship, in south-western Poland.
