= Borek, Namysłów County =

Settlement in Poland

Borek
- Przysiółek
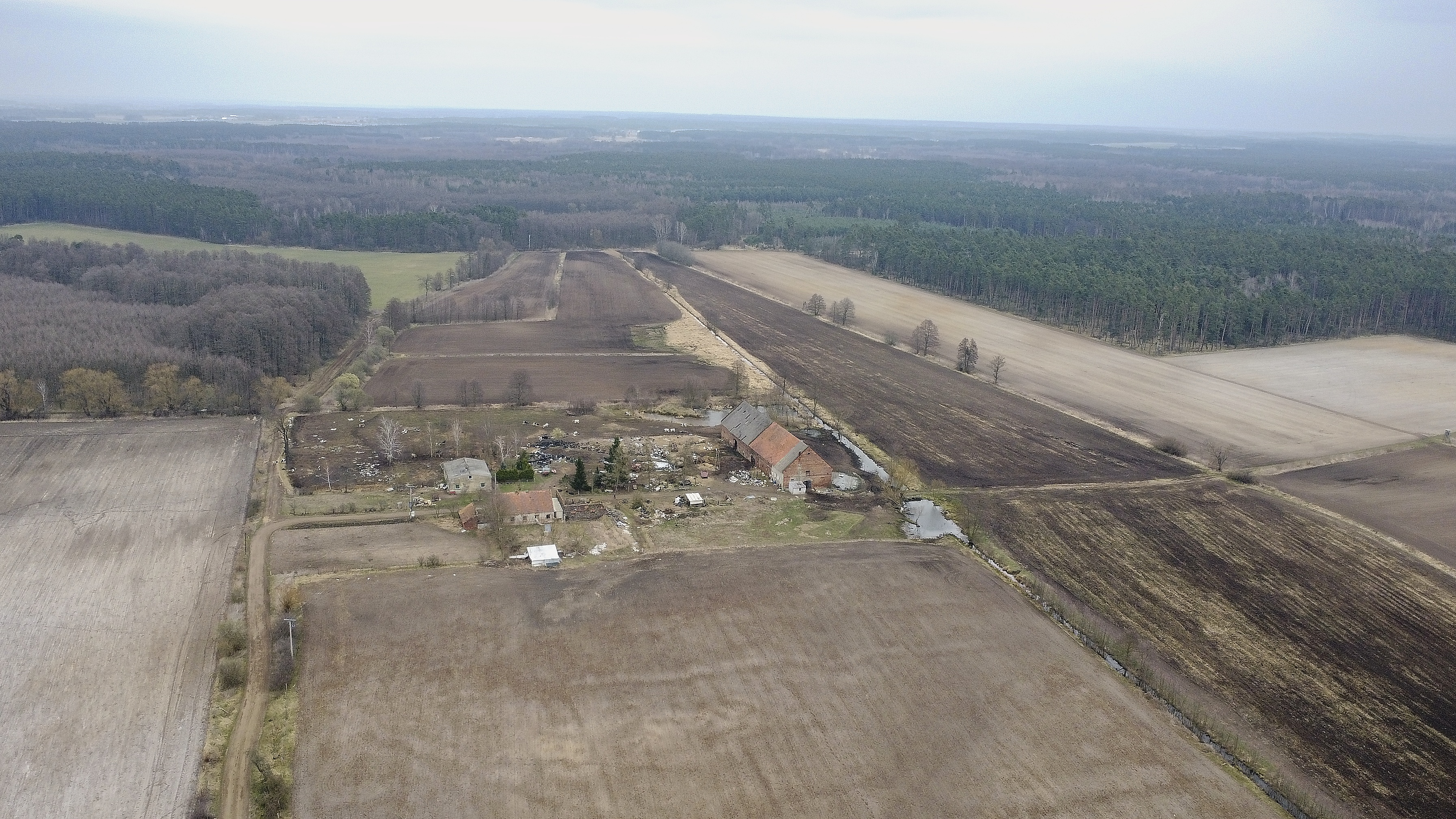

- Location within Poland
- Coordinates: 51°1′47″N 17°37′2″E
- Country: Poland
- Voivodeship: Opole
- County: Namysłów
- Gmina: Namysłów

Borek [ˈbɔrɛk] is a przysiółek in the administrative district of Gmina Namysłów, within Namysłów County, Opole Voivodeship, in south-western Poland.
