= Świbne =

- Village
- Location within Poland
- Coordinates: 51°4′57″N 17°53′21″E
- Country: Poland
- Voivodeship: Opole
- County: Namysłów
- Gmina: Domaszowice

Świbne [ˈɕfibnɛ] is a village in the administrative district of Gmina Domaszowice, within Namysłów County, Opole Voivodeship, in south-western Poland.
