= Agroplon Głuszyna =

Polish association football club

- Full name: Ludowy Zespół Sportowy; Agroplon Głuszyna
- Founded: 1948; 77 years ago
- Dissolved: 2021; 4 years ago
- Ground: Namysłów Stadium
- Capacity: 2,280
- Website: LZS Agroplon Głuszyna on Facebook

Agroplon Głuszyna was a Polish football club based in Głuszyna. It was founded on 1 January 1948. The club most recently competed in IV liga Silesia, the fifth tier of Polish football, before withdrawing from competition in December 2021.

Along with most of the league, they were forced to suspend their season during the month of March 2020. This was due to the COVID-19 pandemic and the recommendation of the Ministry of Sport and Tourism.
