= Lubnów, Opole Voivodeship =

Lubnów
- Village
- Location within Poland
- Coordinates: 50°58′N 17°55′E
- Country: Poland
- Voivodeship: Opole
- County: Namysłów
- Gmina: Pokój

Lubnów ([ˈlubnuf]; German: Liebenau; Silesian: Lubnōw) is a village in the administrative district of Gmina Pokój, within Namysłów County, Opole Voivodeship, in south-western Poland.
