= Domaszowice, Opole Voivodeship =

Domaszowice
- Village
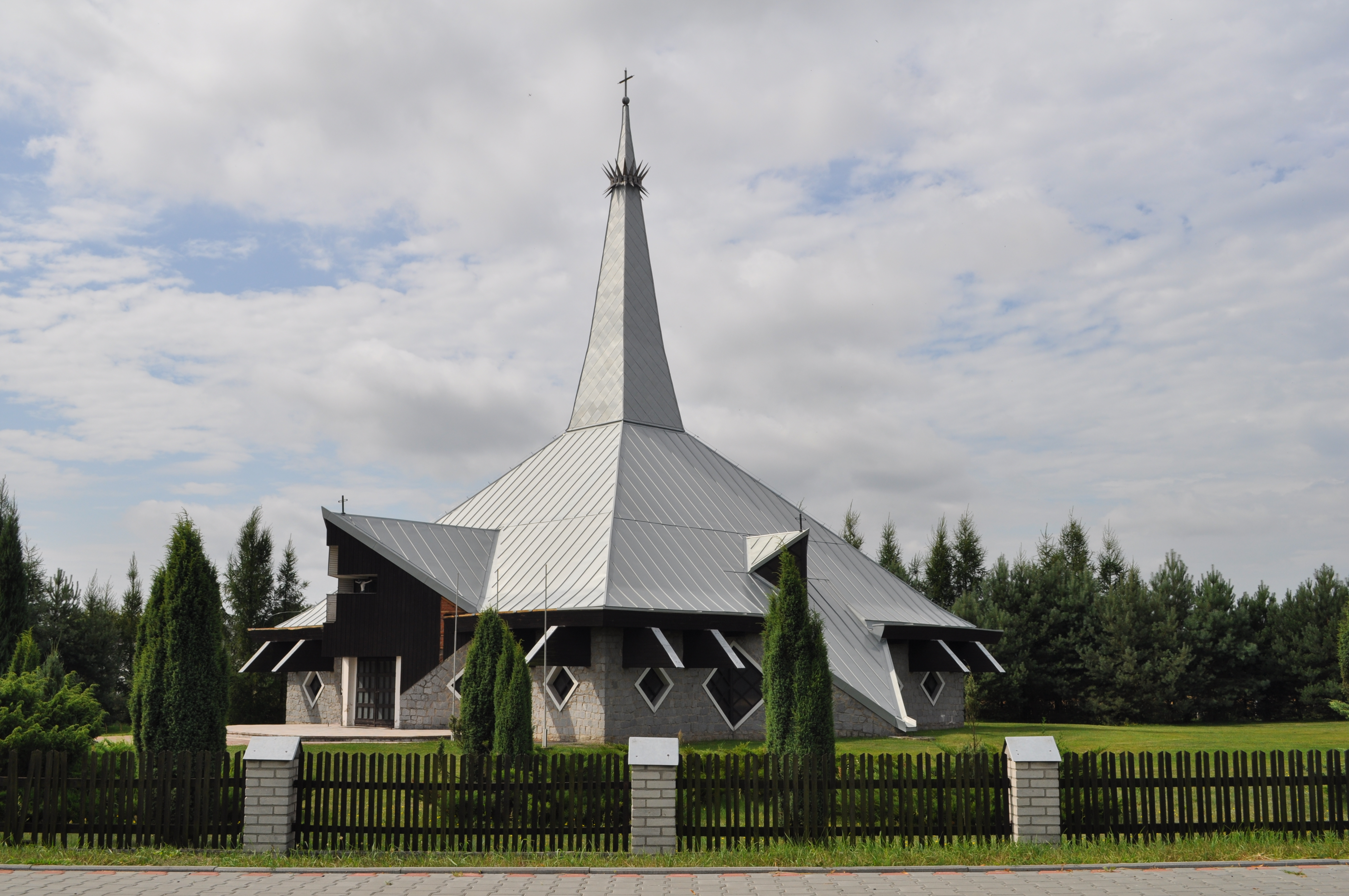
- Church in Domaszowice

- Location within Poland
- Coordinates: 51°3′N 17°54′E
- Country: Poland
- Voivodeship: Opole
- County: Namysłów
- Gmina: Domaszowice
- Population: 1,100

Domaszowice [dɔmaʂɔˈvit͡sɛ] is a village in Namysłów County, Opole Voivodeship, in south-western Poland. It is the seat of the gmina (administrative district) called Gmina Domaszowice.
