= Zawiść, Opole Voivodeship =

Zawiść
- Village
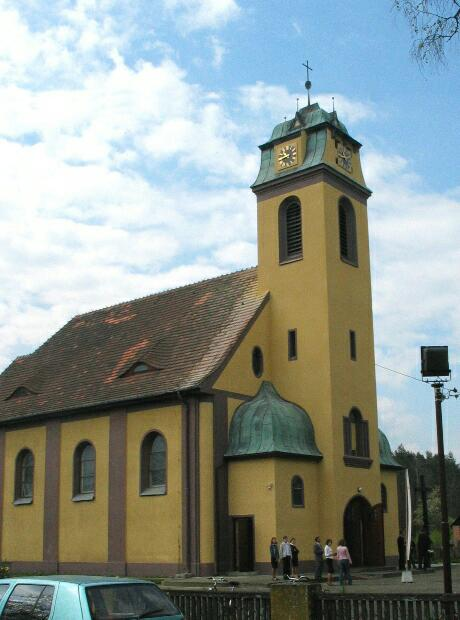
- St. Joseph Church in Zawiść

- Location within Poland
- Coordinates: 50°59′N 17°58′E
- Country: Poland
- Voivodeship: Opole
- County: Namysłów
- Gmina: Pokój
- Time zone: UTC+1 (CET)
  - Summer (DST): UTC+2 (CEST)
- Vehicle registration: ONA

Zawiść ([ˈzaviɕt͡ɕ]; German: Zawisc, 1936–45 Winterfeld; Silesian: Zawiyść) is a village in the administrative district of Gmina Pokój, within Namysłów County, Opole Voivodeship, in southern Poland.

== History ==
In 1885, the village had a population of 481.

Under Nazi Germany, the village was renamed to Winterfeld in Oberschlesien in attempt to erase traces of Polish origin. In the final stages of World War II, a German-organized death march of Allied prisoners of war from the Stalag Luft 7 POW camp stopped in the village on 19 January 1945. After the war, the village became again part of Poland, and its historic Polish name was restored.
