= Mikowice, Opole Voivodeship =

Mikowice
- Village
- Location within Poland
- Coordinates: 51°2′N 17°33′E
- Country: Poland
- Voivodeship: Opole
- County: Namysłów
- Gmina: Namysłów

Mikowice [mikɔˈvit͡sɛ] (German Lampersdorf) is a village in the administrative district of Gmina Namysłów, within Namysłów County, Opole Voivodeship, in south-western Poland.
