= Żabka, Opole Voivodeship =

Żabka
- Village
- Location within Poland
- Coordinates: 50°59′56″N 17°39′44″E
- Country: Poland
- Voivodeship: Opole
- County: Namysłów
- Gmina: Namysłów

Żabka [ˈʐapka] is a village in the administrative district of Gmina Namysłów, within Namysłów County, Opole Voivodeship, in south-western Poland.
