= Gmina Pokój =

Gmina Pokój Pokój Commune
- Gmina
- Coat of arms
- Interactive map of Gmina Pokój
- Coordinates (Pokój): 50°55′N 17°50′E
- Country: Poland
- Voivodeship: Opole
- County: Namysłów
- Seat: Pokój

Area
  - Total: 132.97 km^{2} (51.34 sq mi)

Population (2019-06-30)
  - Total: 5,228
  - Density: 39.32/km^{2} (101.8/sq mi)
- Website: http://www.gminapokoj.pl

Gmina Pokój is a rural gmina (administrative district) in Namysłów County, Opole Voivodeship, in south-western Poland. Its seat is the village of Pokój, which lies approximately 20 kilometres (12 mi) south-east of Namysłów and 29 km (18 mi) north of the regional capital Opole.

The gmina covers an area of 132.97 square kilometres (51.3 sq mi). As of 2019, its total population was 5,228.

The gmina contains part of the protected area called Stobrawa Landscape Park.

== Villages ==
Gmina Pokój contains the villages and settlements of Dąbrówka Dolna, Domaradz, Domaradzka Kuźnia, Fałkowice, Jagienna, Kopalina, Kozuby, Krogulna, Krzywa Góra, Ładza, Lubnów, Paryż, Pokój, Siedlice, Świercowskie, Żabiniec, Zawiść and Zieleniec.

== Neighbouring gminas ==
Gmina Pokój is bordered by the gminas of Dobrzeń Wielki, Domaszowice, Murów, Popielów, Świerczów and Wołczyn.

== Twin towns – sister cities ==
Gmina Pokój is twinned with:

- Enkenbach-Alsenborn, Germany
- Hochspeyer, Germany
