= Gmina Namysłów =

Gmina Namysłów Namysłów Commune
- Gmina
- Flag Coat of arms
- Interactive map of Gmina Namysłów
- Coordinates (Namysłów): 51°4′22″N 17°42′25″E
- Country: Poland
- Voivodeship: Opole
- County: Namysłów
- Seat: Namysłów

Area
  - Total: 289.95 km^{2} (111.95 sq mi)

Population (2019-06-30)
  - Total: 26,145
  - Density: 90.171/km^{2} (233.54/sq mi)
  - Urban: 16,551
  - Rural: 9,594
- Website: https://namyslow.eu

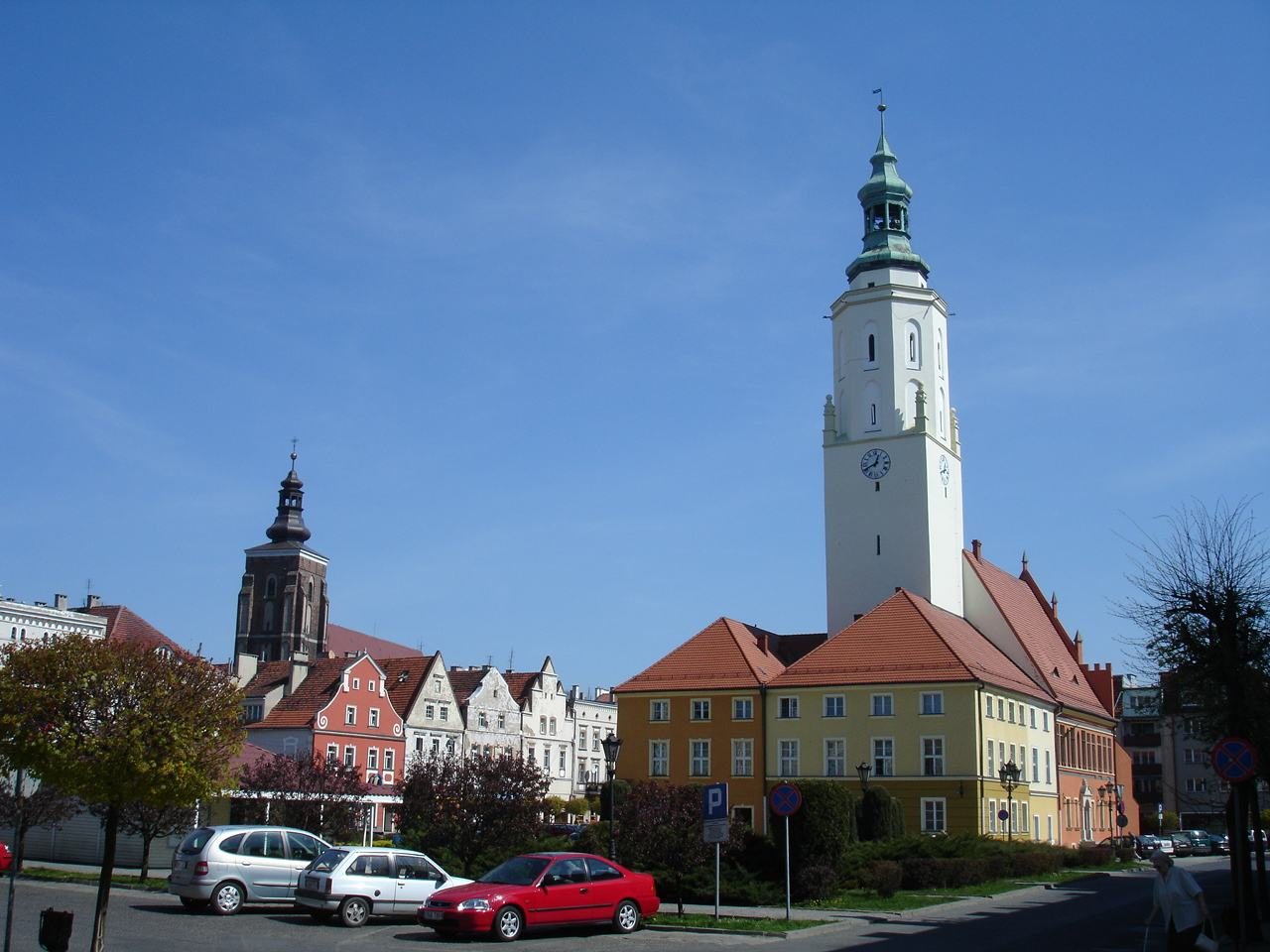
Namysłów main square

Gmina Namysłów is an urban-rural gmina (administrative district) in Namysłów County, Opole Voivodeship, in south-western Poland. Its seat is the town of Namysłów, which lies approximately 48 kilometres (30 mi) north of the regional capital Opole.

The gmina covers an area of 289.95 square kilometres (112.0 sq mi). As of 2019, its total population was 26,145.

== Villages ==
Apart from the town of Namysłów, Gmina Namysłów contains the villages and settlements of Baldwinowice, Barzyna, Bławaciska, Borek, Brzezinka, Brzozowiec, Bukowa Śląska, Głuszyna, Grabówka, Hałderze, Igłowice, Jastrzębie, Józefków, Kamienna, Karolówka, Kowalowice, Krasowice, Krzemieniec, Łączany, Ligota Książęca, Ligotka, Marysin, Michalice, Mikowice, Minkowskie, Młynek, Młyńskie Stawy, Niwki, Nowe Smarchowice, Nowy Dwór, Nowy Folwark, Objazda, Pawłowice Namysłowskie, Piękna Studnia, Przeczów, Rychnów, Rychnów Dolny, Smarchowice Małe, Smarchowice Śląskie, Smarchowice Wielkie, Smogorzów, Stanek, Staszków, Winniki, Woskowice Małe, Wszemil, Wszeradów, Żaba, Żabiak, Żabka, Zielony Dąb and Ziemiełowice.

== Neighbouring gminas ==
Gmina Namysłów is bordered by the gminas of Bierutów, Domaszowice, Dziadowa Kłoda, Jelcz-Laskowice, Lubsza, Perzów, Rychtal, Świerczów and Wilków.

== Twin towns – sister cities ==
Gmina Namysłów is twinned with:

- Hlučín, Czech Republic
- Kisköre, Hungary
- Nebelschütz, Germany
- Yaremche, Ukraine
- Zagon, Romania
