= Siedlice, Opole Voivodeship =

Siedlice
- Village
- Location within Poland
- Coordinates: 50°56′N 17°46′E
- Country: Poland
- Voivodeship: Opole
- County: Namysłów
- Gmina: Pokój

Siedlice ([ɕɛˈdlit͡sɛ]; German: Seidlitz) is a village in the administrative district of Gmina Pokój, within Namysłów County, Opole Voivodeship, in south-western Poland.
