= Ziemiełowice =

- Village
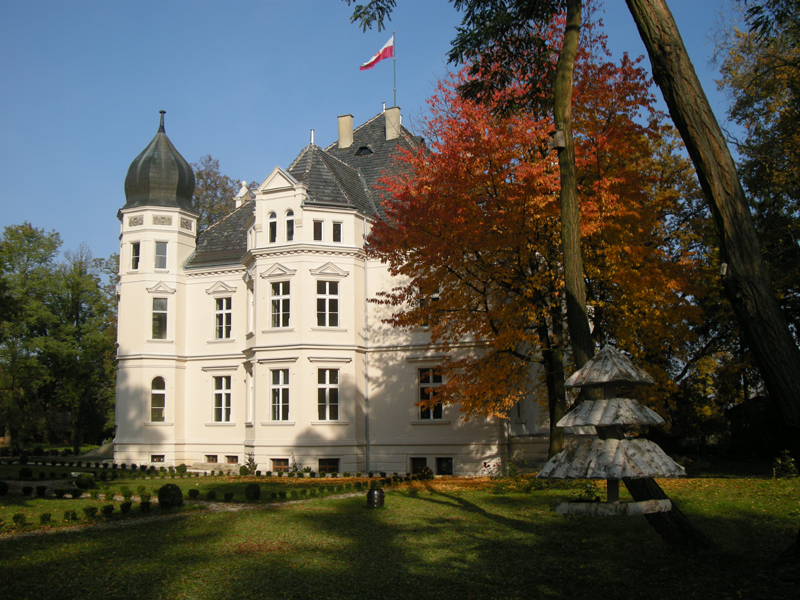

- Location within Poland
- Coordinates: 51°3′N 17°45′E
- Country: Poland
- Voivodeship: Opole
- County: Namysłów
- Gmina: Namysłów

Ziemiełowice [ʑɛmjɛwɔˈvit͡sɛ] (German Simmelwitz) is a village in the administrative district of Gmina Namysłów, within Namysłów County, Opole Voivodeship, in south-western Poland.
