= Woskowice Małe =

- Village
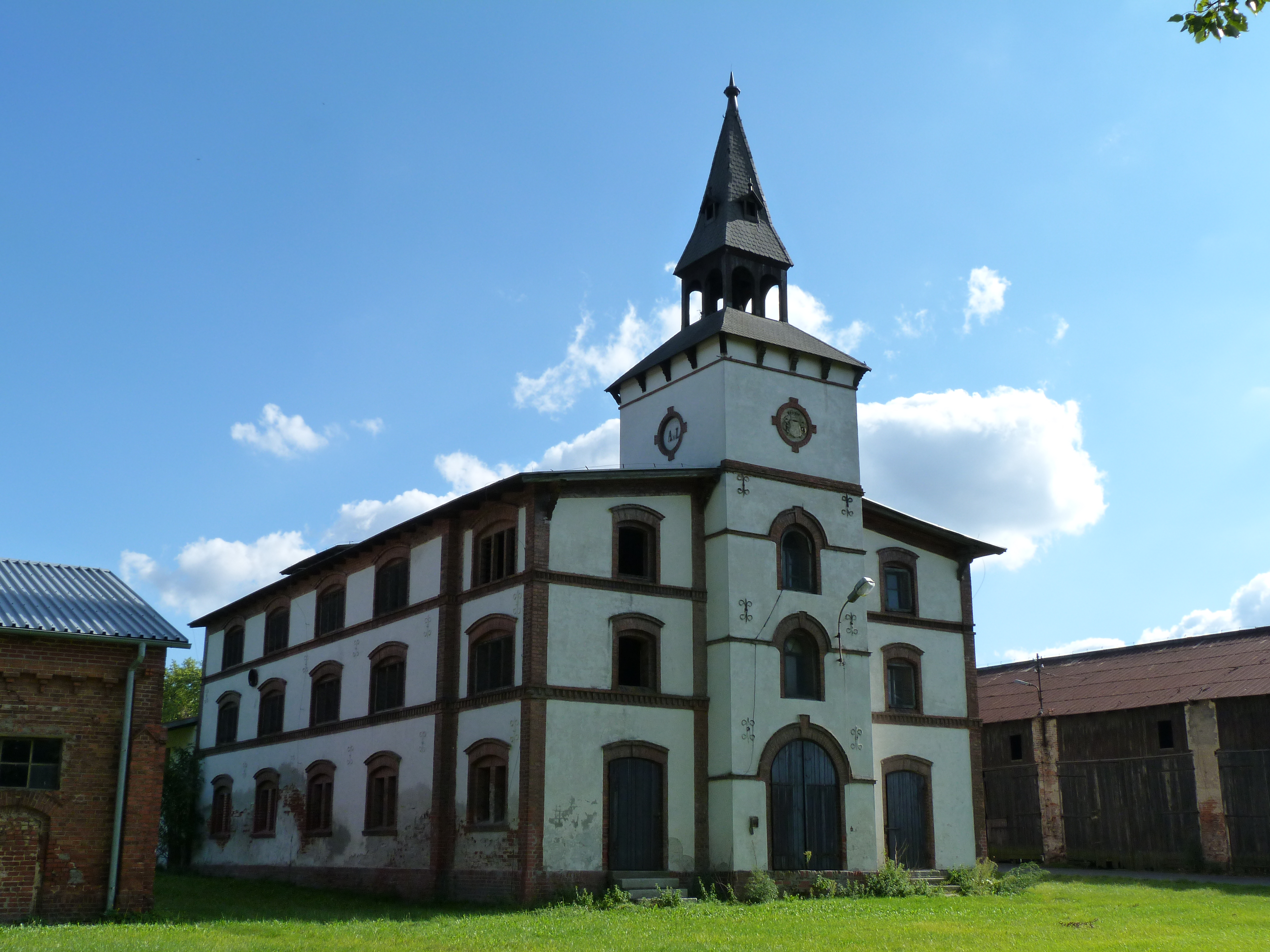

- Location within Poland
- Coordinates: 51°06′11″N 17°51′38″E
- Country: Poland
- Voivodeship: Opole
- County: Namysłów
- Gmina: Namysłów
- Population (approx.): 450

Woskowice Małe [vɔskɔˈvit͡sɛ ˈmawɛ] is a village in the administrative district of Gmina Namysłów, within Namysłów County, Opole Voivodeship, in south-western Poland.
