= Domaradz, Opole Voivodeship =

Domaradz
- Village
- Location within Poland
- Coordinates: 50°57′N 17°52′E
- Country: Poland
- Voivodeship: Opole
- County: Namysłów
- Gmina: Pokój

Domaradz ([dɔˈmarat͡s]; German: Dammratsch, 1936–45 Dammfelde) is a village in the administrative district of Gmina Pokój, within Namysłów County, Opole Voivodeship, in south-western Poland.
