= Gmina Domaszowice =

Gmina Domaszowice Domaszowice Commune
- Gmina
- Flag Coat of arms
- Interactive map of Gmina Domaszowice
- Coordinates (Domaszowice): 51°3′N 17°54′E
- Country: Poland
- Voivodeship: Opole
- County: Namysłów
- Seat: Domaszowice

Area
  - Total: 113.86 km^{2} (43.96 sq mi)

Population (2019-06-30)
  - Total: 3,591
  - Density: 31.54/km^{2} (81.68/sq mi)
- Website: http://www.domaszowice.pl

Gmina Domaszowice is a rural gmina (administrative district) in Namysłów County, Opole Voivodeship, in south-western Poland. Its seat is the village of Domaszowice, which lies approximately 14 kilometres (9 mi) east of Namysłów and 43 km (27 mi) north of the regional capital Opole.

The gmina covers an area of 113.86 square kilometres (44.0 sq mi). As of 2019, its total population was 3,591.

== Villages ==
Gmina Domaszowice contains the villages and settlements of Domaszowice, Dziedzice, Gręboszów, Kopalina, Nowa Wieś, Piekło, Polkowskie, Siemysłów, Stary Gręboszów, Strzelce, Sułoszów, Świbne, Szerzyna, Wielka Kolonia, Wielołęka, Włochy, Woskowice Górne, Wygoda, Zalesie and Zofijówka.

== Neighbouring gminas ==
Gmina Domaszowice is bordered by the gminas of Namysłów, Pokój, Rychtal, Świerczów and Wołczyn.
