= Rychnów, Opole Voivodeship =

Rychnów
- Village
- Location within Poland
- Coordinates: 51°5′N 17°47′E
- Country: Poland
- Voivodeship: Opole
- County: Namysłów
- Gmina: Namysłów

Rychnów [ˈrɨxnuf] (German Reichen) is a village in the administrative district of Gmina Namysłów, within Namysłów County, Opole Voivodeship, in south-western Poland.
