= Żaba =

- Village
- Location within Poland
- Coordinates: 50°59′28″N 17°40′20″E
- Country: Poland
- Voivodeship: Opole
- County: Namysłów
- Gmina: Namysłów

Żaba [ˈʐaba] (German Saabe) is a village in the administrative district of Gmina Namysłów, within Namysłów County, Opole Voivodeship, in south-western Poland.
