= Zabka (spider) =

Scientific classification
- Kingdom: Animalia
- Phylum: Arthropoda
- Subphylum: Chelicerata
- Class: Arachnida
- Order: Araneae
- Infraorder: Araneomorphae
- Family: Salticidae
- Genus: Zabka; Wang, Li & Pham, 2023

Type species
- Euophrys cooki Żabka, 1985

Species
- 3, see text

Genus of spiders

Zabka is a genus of spiders in the family Salticidae.

== Distribution ==
Zabka is found in China and Vietnam, with two species endemic to China and one to Vietnam.

== Etymology ==
The genus honors Polish arachnologist Marek Michał Żabka.

== Species ==
As of January 2026, this genus includes three species:

- Zabka cooki (Żabka, 1985) – Vietnam
- Zabka dianmian Wang, Yu & Zhang, 2024 – China
- Zabka xuyei (Lin & Li, 2020) – China
