= Zaba (surname) =

Žába and Žaba (feminines: Žábová and Žabová) are Czech and Slovak surnames. Żaba is a Polish surname. They all mean 'frog'. Notable people with the surnames include:

- August Kościesza-Żaba (1801–1894), Polish Kurdologist
- Matt Zaba (born 1983), Canadian ice hockey player
- Zbyněk Žába (1917–1971), Czech Egyptologist
