= Siołkowice =

Coordinates: 50°48′N 17°46′E

Siołkowice is the name of two villages in Poland, in the Opole Voivodeship, close to the village of Popielów. One is named Stare ("Old") Siołkowice, the other being Nowe ("New") Siołkowice. The village is known as the birthplace of Jakub Kania, a folk poet, and Edmund Saporski-Woś, the pioneer of Polish settlement in Brazil. For several years, Jan Dzierżon served in the parish in the village (Stare Siołkowice).
