= Gmina Popielów =

Gmina Popielów Popielów Commune
- Gmina
- Coat of arms
- Interactive map of Gmina Popielów
- Coordinates (Popielów): 50°49′33″N 17°44′31″E
- Country: Poland
- Voivodeship: Opole
- County: Opole
- Seat: Popielów

Area
  - Total: 175.57 km^{2} (67.79 sq mi)

Population (2019-06-30)
  - Total: 8,051
  - Density: 45.86/km^{2} (118.8/sq mi)
- Website: http://www.popielow.pl

Gmina Popielów is a rural gmina (administrative district) in Opole County, Opole Voivodeship, in south-western Poland. Its seat is the village of Popielów, which lies approximately 23 kilometres (14 mi) north-west of the regional capital Opole.

The gmina covers an area of 175.57 square kilometres (67.8 sq mi), and as of 2019 its total population is 8,051.

The gmina contains part of the protected area called Stobrawa Landscape Park.

== Villages ==
Gmina Popielów contains the villages and settlements of Kaniów, Karłowice, Kurznie, Kuźnica Katowska, Lubienia, Nowe Siołkowice, Popielów, Popielowska Kolonia, Rybna, Stare Kolnie, Stare Siołkowice and Stobrawa.

== Neighbouring gminas ==
Gmina Popielów is bordered by the gminas of Dąbrowa, Dobrzeń Wielki, Lewin Brzeski, Lubsza, Pokój, Skarbimierz and Świerczów.

== Twin towns – sister cities ==
Gmina Popielów is twinned with:

- Bad Wurzach, Germany
- Bikal, Hungary
- Krakovany, Czech Republic
- Krakovany, Slovakia
- Rüdersdorf, Germany
