= Krakovany =

Krakovany may refer to places:

- Krakovany, Piešťany, a municipality and village in Slovakia
- Krakovany (Kolín District), a municipality and village in the Czech Republic
