= Dammer =

Dammer may refer to:

- Carl Lebrecht Udo Dammer (1860–1920), a German botanist
- Ober Dammer, German name for Dąbrowa Górna, Lower Silesian Voivodeship, a village in the administrative district of Gmina Lubin, within Lubin County, Lower Silesian Voivodeship, in south-western Poland
- Dammer, German name for Dąbrowa, a village in Namysłów County, Opole Voivodeship, in south-western Poland

== See also ==
- Dammers (disambiguation)
- Dahmer (disambiguation)
