= Johann Dzierzon =

Polish apiarist (1811–1906)

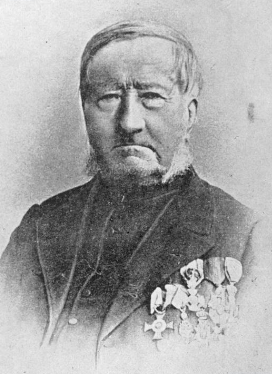
- Jan Dzierżon in 1905
- Born: Jan Dzierżon; 16 January 1811; Lowkowitz, Kingdom of Prussia (Łowkowice, Poland)
- Died: 26 October 1906 (aged 95); Lowkowitz, Germany
- Occupations: Roman Catholic priest; beekeeper
- Known for: discovered the phenomenon of parthenogenesis in bees; designed the first successful movable-frame beehive

Johann Dzierzon, or Jan Dzierżon [ˈjan ˈd͡ʑɛrʐɔn] or Dzierżoń [ˈd͡ʑɛrʐɔɲ], also John Dzierzon (16 January 1811 – 26 October 1906), was a Polish apiarist who discovered the phenomenon of parthenogenesis in bees.

Dzierzon came from a Polish family in Silesia. Trained in theology, he combined his theoretical and practical work in apiculture with his duties as a Roman Catholic priest, before being compulsorily retired by the Church and eventually excommunicated over the question of papal infallibility. In 1905, he was reconciled with the Catholic Church.

His discoveries and innovations made him world-famous in scientific and beekeeping circles, and he has been described as the "father of modern apiculture".

== Nationality/ethnicity ==
Dzierzon came from Upper Silesia. Born into a family of ethnic Polish background which did not speak German but a Silesian ethnolect, he has been variously described as having been of Polish, German, or Silesian nationality. Dzierzon himself wrote: "As for my nationality, I am, as my name indicates, a Pole by birth, as Polish is spoken in Upper Silesia. But as I came to Breslau as a 10-year-old and pursued my studies there, I became German by education. But science knows no borders or nationality."

It was at gymnasium and at the theological faculty that he became acquainted with German scientific and literary language, which he subsequently used in his scientific writings, rather than his native Polish-Silesian dialect. He used Silesian-Polish in some press publications, in his private life, and in pastoral work, alongside literary Polish. Dzierzon considered himself a member of the Polish nation.

Dzierzon's manuscripts, letters, diplomas and original copies of his works were given to a Polish museum by his nephew, Franciszek Dzierżoń. Following the 1939 German invasion of Poland, many objects connected with Dzierzon were destroyed by German gendarmes on 1 December 1939 in an effort to conceal his Polish roots. The Nazis made strenuous efforts to enforce a view of Dzierżoń as a German.

== Life ==
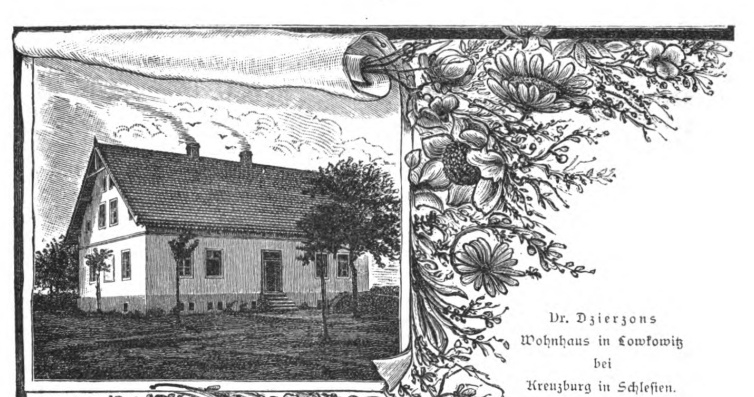
Home in Lowkowitz

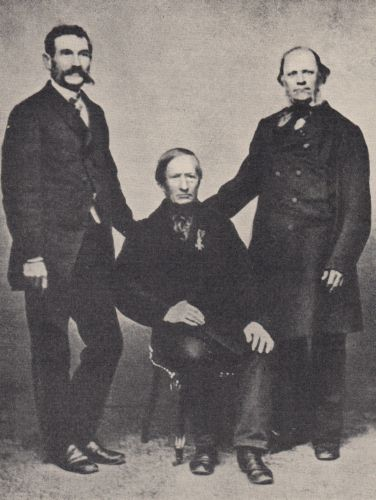
Franz Hruschka, Johann Dzierzon and Andre Schmidt probably around 1871

Dzierzon was born on 16 January 1811 in the village of Lowkowitz (Polish: Łowkowice), near Kreuzburg (Kluczbork), where his parents owned a farm. He completed Polish elementary school before he was sent to a Protestant school located a mile from his village. In 1822, he moved to Breslau (Wrocław), where he attended middle school (gymnasium). In 1833, he graduated from the University of Breslau's Faculty of Catholic Theology. In 1834, he became chaplain in Schalkowitz (Siołkowice). In 1835, as an ordained Roman Catholic priest, he took over a parish in Karlsmarkt (Karłowice), where he lived for 49 years.

== Scientific career ==
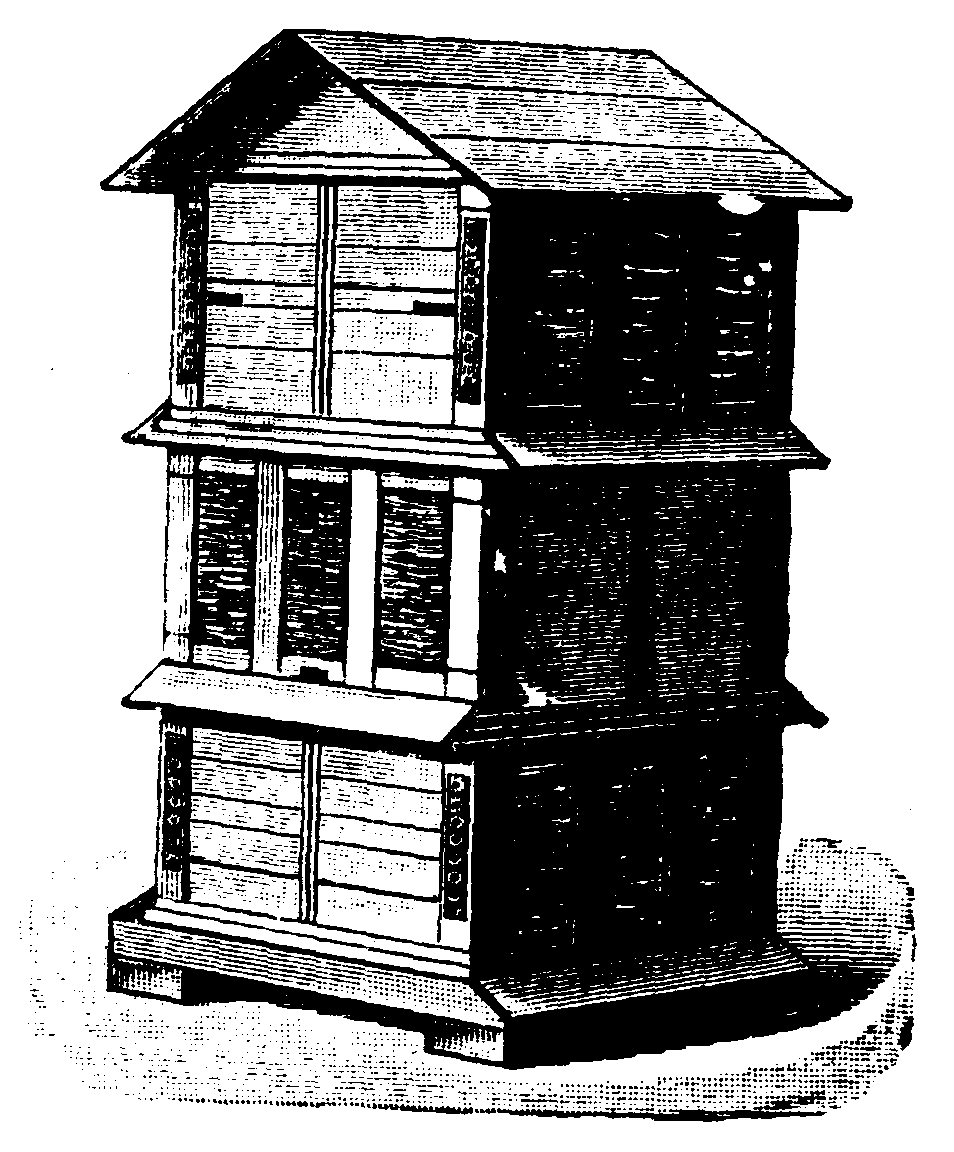
Stack of Dzierzon hives. Illustration from Nordisk familjebok.

In his apiary, Dzierzon studied the social life of honeybees and constructed several experimental beehives – possibly using ideas from Petro Prokopovych's widely-publicized developments. In 1838 he devised a movable-comb beehive, which allowed manipulation of individual honeycombs without destroying the structure of the hive. The correct distance between combs had been described as 1 1/2 inches (38 mm) from the center of one top bar to the center of the next one. In 1848 Dzierzon introduced grooves into the hive's side walls, replacing the strips of wood for moving top bars. The grooves were 8 × 8 mm – the exact average between 1/4 and 3/8 inch (6.4 and 9.5 mm), which is the range called the "bee space." Such designs quickly gained popularity in Europe and North America. On the basis of the aforementioned measurements, August Adolph von Berlepsch (May 1852) in Thuringia and L.L. Langstroth (October 1852) in the United States designed their own movable-frame hives.

In 1835 Dzierzon discovered that drones are produced from unfertilized eggs. Dzierzon's paper, published in 1845, proposed that while queen bees and female worker bees were products of fertilization, drones were not, and that the diets of immature bees contributed to their subsequent roles. His results caused a revolution in bee crossbreeding and may have influenced Gregor Mendel's pioneering genetic research. The theory remained controversial until 1906, the year of Dzierzon's death, when it was finally accepted by scientists at a conference in Marburg. In 1853 he acquired a colony of Italian bees to use as genetic markers in his research, and sent their progeny "to all the countries of Europe, and even to America." In 1854 he discovered the mechanism of secretion of royal jelly and its role in the development of queen bees.

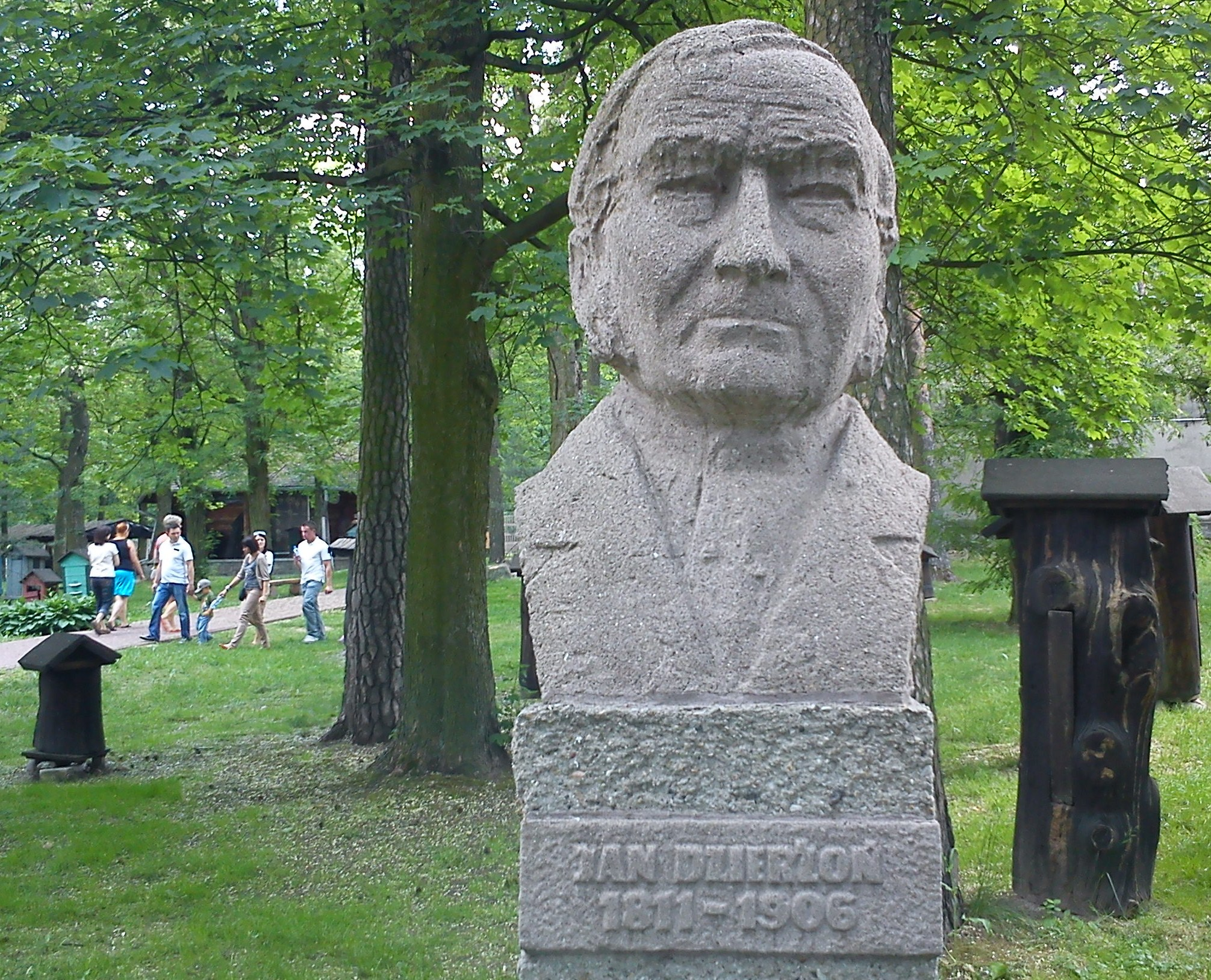
Bust of Jan Dzierżoń, National Museum of Agriculture in Szreniawa

With his discoveries and innovations, Dzierzon became world-famous in his lifetime. He received some hundred honorary memberships and awards from societies and organizations. In 1872, he received an honorary doctorate from the Ludwig-Maximilians-Universität München. Other honors included the Austrian Order of Franz Joseph, the Bavarian Merit Order of St. Michael, the Hessian Ludwigsorden, the Russian Order of St. Anna, the Swedish Order of Vasa, the Prussian Order of the Crown, 4th Class, on his 90th birthday, and many more. He was an honorary member of the German Academy of Sciences Leopoldina. He also received an honorary diploma at Graz, presented by Archduke Johann of Austria. In 1903 Dzierzon was presented to Emperor Franz Joseph I of Austria. In 1904 he became an honorary member of the Schlesische Gesellschaft für vaterländische Kultur ("Silesian Society for Fatherland Culture").

Dzierzon's questioning of papal infallibility caused him to be retired from the priesthood in 1869. This disagreement, along with his public engagement in local politics, led to his 1873 excommunication. In 1884 he moved back to Lowkowitz, settling in the hamlet An der Grenze, (Granice Łowkowskie). Of his new home, he wrote:

In every direction, one has a broad and pleasant view, and I am pretty happy here, despite the isolation, as I am always close to my beloved bees – which, if one's soul be receptive to the works of the Almighty and the wonders of nature, can transform even a desert into a paradise.

From 1873 to 1902, Dzierzon was in contact with the Old Catholic Church, but in April 1905 he was reconciled with the Roman Catholic Church.

He died in Lowkowitz on 26 October 1906 and is buried in the local graveyard.

== Legacy ==
Johann Dzierzon is considered the father of modern apiology and apiculture. Most modern beehives derive from his design. Due to language barriers, Dzierzon was unaware of the achievements of his contemporary, L.L. Langstroth, the American "father of modern beekeeping", though Langstroth had access to translations of Dzierzon's works.

Dzierzon's manuscripts, letters, diplomas and original copies of his works were given to a Polish museum by his nephew, Franciszek Dzierżoń.

In 1936 the Germans renamed Dzierzon's birthplace, Lowkowitz, Bienendorf ("Bee Village") in recognition of his work with apiculture. At the time, the Nazi government was changing many Slavic-derived place names such as Lowkowitz. After the region came under Polish control following World War II, the village would be renamed Łowkowice.

Following the 1939 German invasion of Poland, many objects connected with Dzierzon were destroyed by German gendarmes on 1 December 1939 in an effort to conceal his Polish roots. The Nazis made strenuous efforts to enforce a view of Dzierżoń as a German.

After World War II, when the Polish government assigned Polish names to most places in former German territories which had become part of Poland, the Silesian town of Reichenbach im Eulengebirge (traditionally known in Polish as Rychbach) was renamed Dzierżoniów in the man's honor.

In 1962 a Jan Dzierżon Museum of Apiculture was established at Kluczbork. Dzierzon's house in Granice Łowkowskie (now part of Maciejów village) was also turned into a museum chamber, and since 1974 his estates have been used for breeding Krain bees. The museum at Kluczbork houses 5 thousand volumes of works and publications regarding bee keeping, focusing on work by Dzierzon, and presents a permanent exhibition regarding his life presenting pieces from collections from National Ethnographic Museum in Wrocław, and Museum of Silesian Piasts in Brzeg

In 1966 a Polish-language plate was added to his German-language tombstone.

Inscriptions	English translation
Hier ruht in Gott der hochverehrte Altmeister der Bienenzucht; Pfarrer; Dr. Johann Dzierzon; Ritter p.p. * 16. Januar 1811 † 26. Oktober 1906; Ruhe sanft! Wahrheit, Wahrheit über alles!	Here rests in God the revered old master of beekeeping Pastor; Dr. Johann Dzierzon knight etc. * 16 January 1811 † 26 October 1906; Rest in peace! Truth, truth above all!
Tu spoczywa wielki uczony twórca nowoczesnego pszczelarstwa żarliwy patriota i obrońca polskiego ludu na Śląsku, Ks. Dr Jan Dzierżoń; Płytę ta ufundowało w 60 ta rocznice śmierci Społeczeństwo Ziemi Kluczborskiej; 26 X 1966	Here lies the great scientist, founder of modern beekeeping, ardent patriot and defender of the Polish people in Silesia, Father Dr. Jan Dzierżoń. This tablet placed on the 60th anniversary of his death by the people of the Kluczbork Lands, 26 Oct 1966

== Selected works ==
Dzierzon's works include over 800 articles, most published in Bienenzeitung but also in several other scientific periodicals, and 26 books. They appeared between 1844 and 1904, in German and Polish. The most important include:

- 15 November 1845: Chodowanie pszczół – Sztuka zrobienica złota, nawet z zielska, in: Tygodnik Polski Poświęcony Włościanom, Issue 20, Pszczyna (Pless).
- 1848–1852: Theorie und Praxis des neuen Bienenfreundes. ("Theory and Practice of the Modern Bee-friend")
- 1851 and 1859: Nowe udoskonalone pszczelnictwo księdza plebana Dzierżona w Katowicach na Śląsku – 2006 reprint
- 1852: Nachtrag zur Theorie und Praxis des neuen Bienenfreundes (Appendix to "Theory and Practice"), C. H. Beck'sche Buchhandlung, Nördlingen,
- 1853: Najnowsze pszczelnictwo. Lwów

Magazines published by Dzierzon:

- 1854–1856: Der Bienenfreund aus Schlesien ("The Bee-friend from Silesia")
- 1861–1878: Rationelle Bienenzucht ("Rational apiculture")

Articles published by Dzierzon since 1844 in Frauendörfer Blätter, herausgegeben von der prakt. Gartenbau-Gesellschaft in Bayern, redigirt von Eugen Fürst ("Frauendorf News" of the Bavarian Gardeners Society) were collected by Rentmeister Bruckisch from Grottkau (Grodków) and re-published under the titles:

- Neue verbesserte Bienen-Zucht des Johann Dzierzon ("New improved bee-breeding, of John Dzierzon"), Brieg 1855
- Neue verbesserte Bienen-Zucht des Pfarrers Dzierzon zu Carlsmarkt in Schlesien ("New improved bee-breeding, of priest Dzierzon at Carlsmarkt in Silesia"), Ernst'sche Buchhandlung, 1861
- Lebensbeschreibung von ihm selbst, vom 4. August 1885 (abgedruckt im Heimatkalender des Kreises Kreuzburg/OS 1931, S. 32–28), 1885 (Dziergon's own biography, reprinted in 1931)
- Der Zwillingsstock ("Semi-detached beehive"), E. Thielmann, 1890

English translations:

- Dzierzon's rational bee-keeping; or The theory and practice of dr. Dzierzon of Carlsmarkt, Translated by H. Dieck and S. Stutterd, ed. and revised by C. N. Abbott, Published by Houlston & sons, 1882

== See also ==
- List of Poles
- List of Roman Catholic scientist-clerics
