= Kuźnica Katowska =

- Village
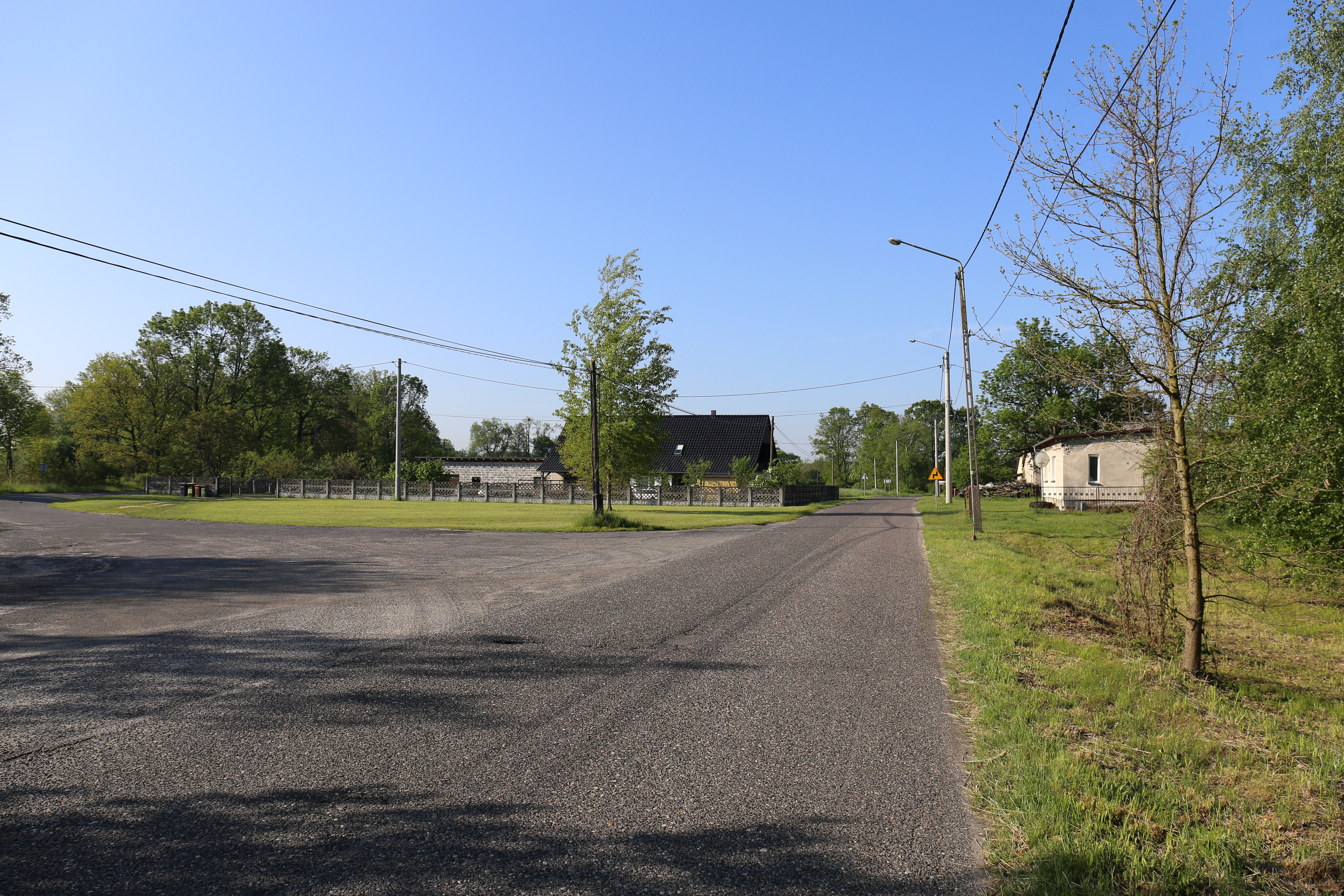

- Location within Poland
- Coordinates: 50°53′N 17°45′E
- Country: Poland
- Voivodeship: Opole
- County: Opole
- Gmina: Popielów

Kuźnica Katowska (Polish: [kuʑˈɲit͡sa kaˈtɔfska]) is a village in the administrative district of Gmina Popielów, within Opole County, Opole Voivodeship, in south-western Poland.
