= Świerczów, Opole Voivodeship =

Świerczów
- Village
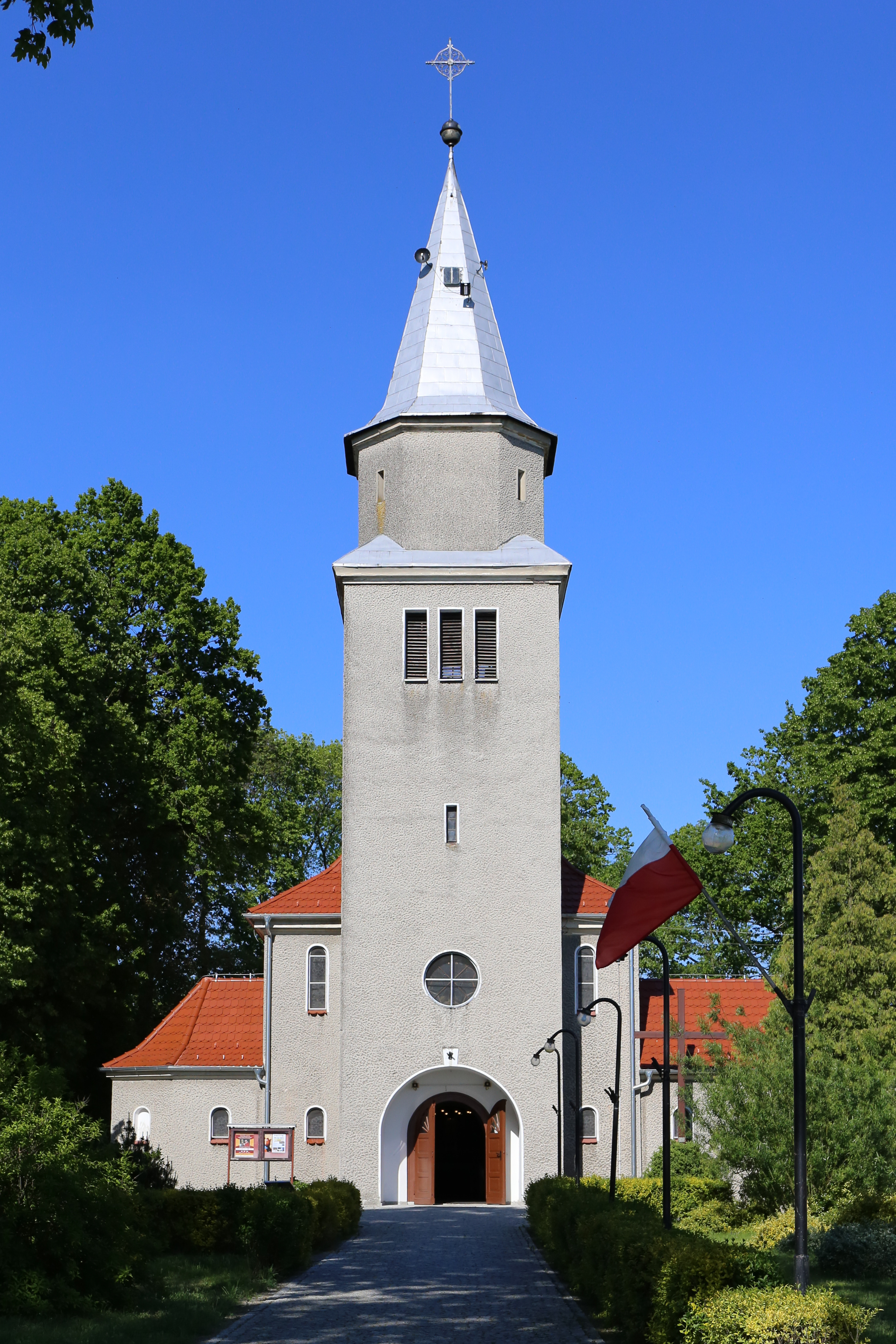
- Sacred Heart of Lord Jesus church in Świerczów in 2019

- Location within Poland
- Coordinates: 50°57′N 17°45′E
- Country: Poland
- Voivodeship: Opole
- County: Namysłów
- Gmina: Świerczów

Świerczów (Polish: [ˈɕfjɛrt͡ʂuf]) (German: Schwirz) is a village in Namysłów County, Opole Voivodeship, in south-western Poland. It is the seat of the gmina (administrative district) called Gmina Świerczów.
