= Pieczyska, Opole Voivodeship =

Pieczyska
- Village
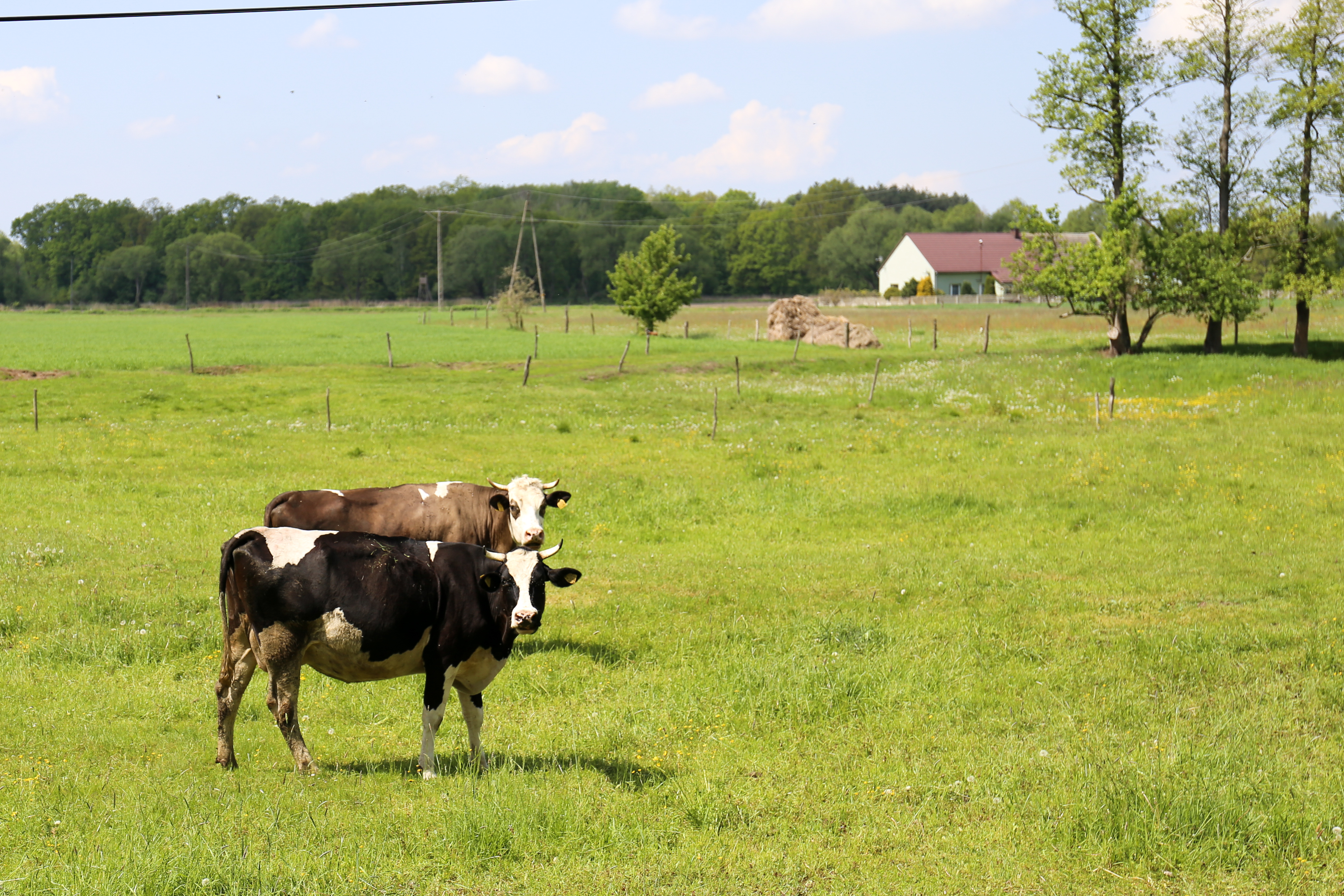
- Field in Pieczyska in 2019

- Location within Poland
- Coordinates: 50°58′48″N 17°51′36″E
- Country: Poland
- Voivodeship: Opole
- County: Namysłów
- Gmina: Świerczów

Pieczyska [pjɛˈt͡ʂɨska] is a village in the administrative district of Gmina Świerczów, within Namysłów County, Opole Voivodeship, in south-western Poland.
