= Kuźnica Dąbrowska =

- Village
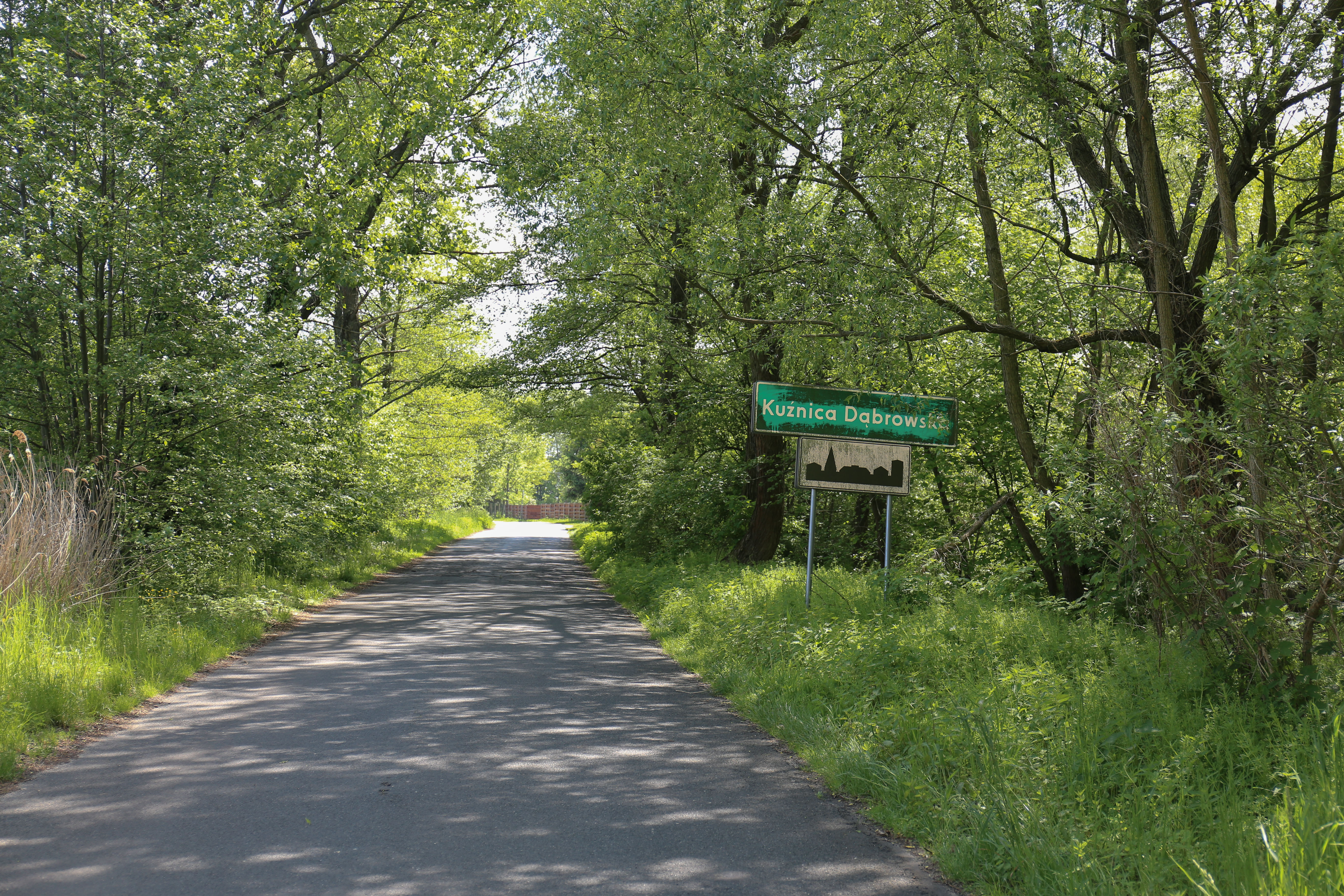
- Road entering Kuźnica Dąbrowska in 2019

- Location within Poland
- Coordinates: 50°58′16″N 17°49′59″E
- Country: Poland
- Voivodeship: Opole
- County: Namysłów
- Gmina: Świerczów

Kuźnica Dąbrowska (Polish pronunciation: [kuʑˈɲit͡sa dɔmˈbrɔfska]) is a village in the administrative district of Gmina Świerczów, within Namysłów County, Opole Voivodeship, in south-western Poland.
