= Miejsce, Opole Voivodeship =

Miejsce
- Village
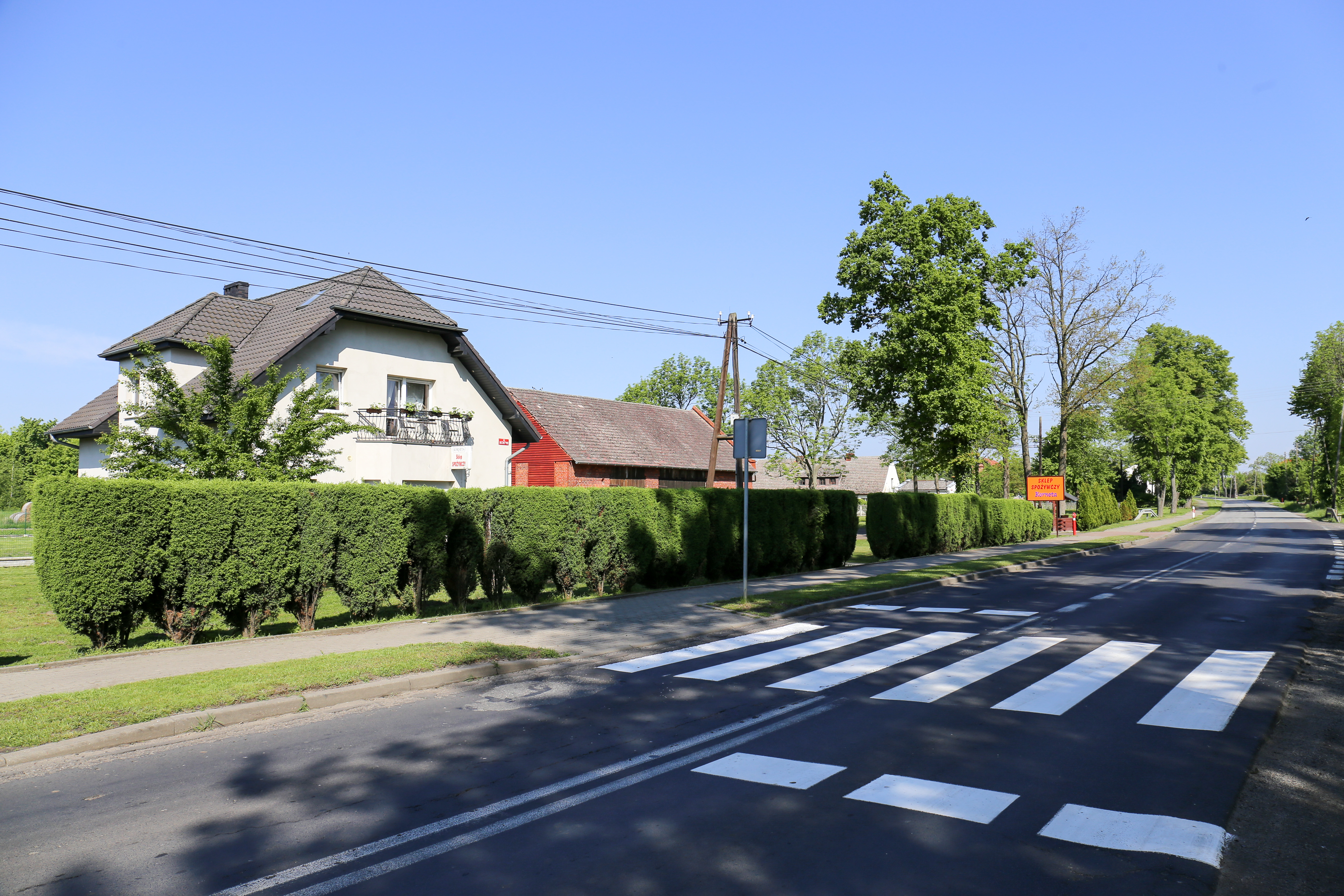
- Street in Miejsce in 2019

- Location within Poland
- Coordinates: 50°56′44″N 17°46′33″E
- Country: Poland
- Voivodeship: Opole
- County: Namysłów
- Gmina: Świerczów
- Time zone: UTC+1 (CET)
  - Summer (DST): UTC+2 (CEST)
- Vehicle registration: ONA

Miejsce [ˈmjɛi̯st͡sɛ] is a village in the administrative district of Gmina Świerczów, within Namysłów County, Opole Voivodeship, in south-western Poland.

== History ==
The village dates back to the Middle Ages, when it was part of Piast-ruled Poland. Its name is of Polish origin, and means "place". It was granted town rights in 1294, but lost them around 1650. It was the location of a medieval motte-and-bailey castle from the 13th-16th century, which is now an archaeological site. In the 18th century, the village was annexed by Prussia, and from 1871 to 1945 it was also part of Germany, before it became again part of Poland following Germany's defeat in World War II.
