= Zbica =

- Village
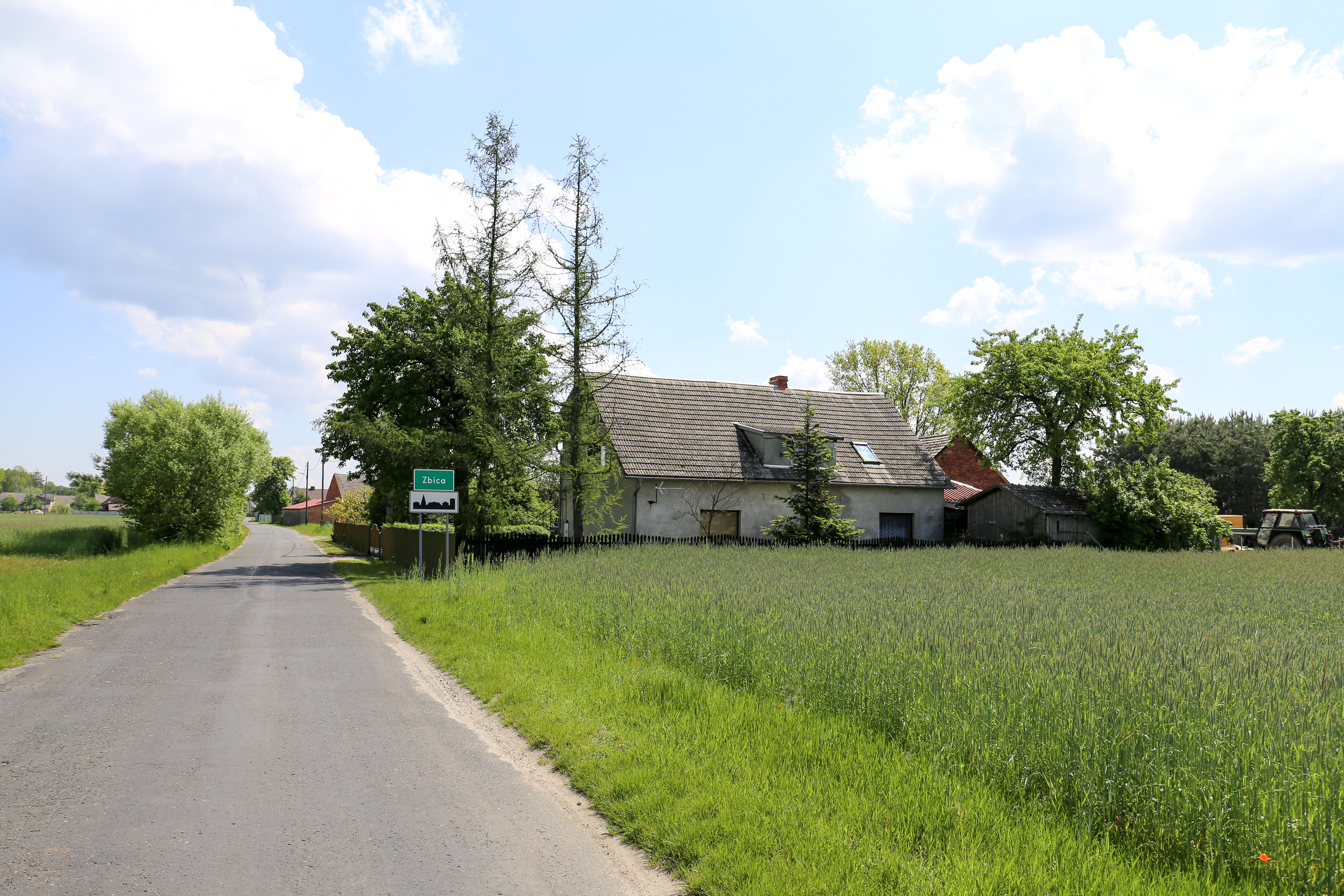
- Road entering Zbica in 2019

- Location within Poland
- Coordinates: 50°58′12.19″N 17°51′46.85″E
- Country: Poland
- Voivodeship: Opole
- County: Namysłów
- Gmina: Świerczów

Zbica [ˈzbit͡sa] is a village in the administrative district of Gmina Świerczów, within Namysłów County, Opole Voivodeship, in south-western Poland.
