= Wężowice, Opole Voivodeship =

Wężowice
- Village
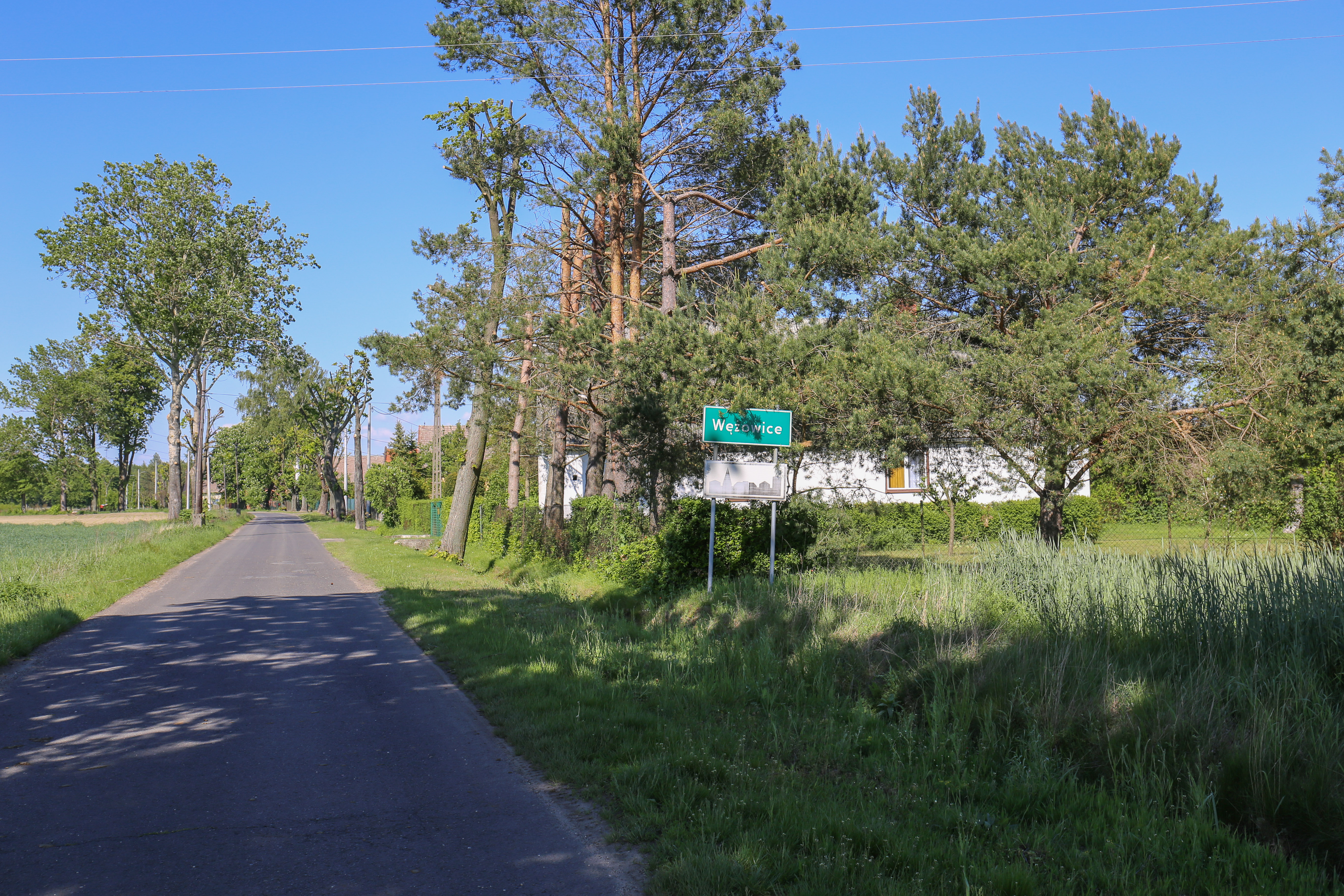
- Road entering Wężowice in 2019

- Location within Poland
- Coordinates: 50°57′31″N 17°42′46″E
- Country: Poland
- Voivodeship: Opole
- County: Namysłów
- Gmina: Świerczów

Wężowice [vɛ̃ʐɔˈvit͡sɛ] is a village in the administrative district of Gmina Świerczów, within Namysłów County, Opole Voivodeship, in south-western Poland.
