= Kaniów, Opole Voivodeship =

Kaniów
- Village
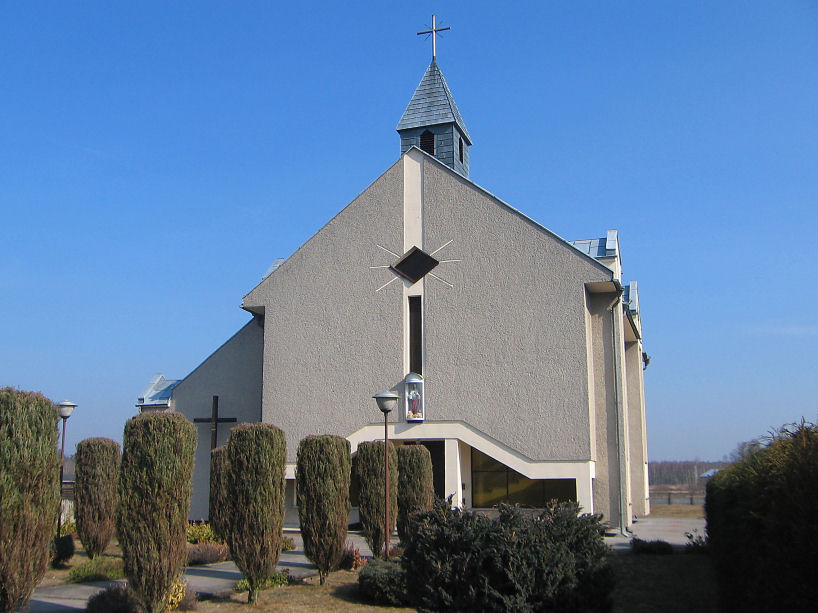
- Sacred Heart church in Kaniów

- Location within Poland
- Coordinates: 50°49′50″N 17°50′08″E
- Country: Poland
- Voivodeship: Opole
- County: Opole
- Gmina: Popielów
- Time zone: UTC+1 (CET)
  - Summer (DST): UTC+2 (CEST)
- Vehicle registration: OPO

Kaniów [ˈkaɲuf] is a village in the administrative district of Gmina Popielów, within Opole County, Opole Voivodeship, in southern Poland.

The village is traditionally inhabited by the Leśnioki ethnographic subgroup of the Polish people.

== History ==
In the Middle Ages, the village was part of Piast-ruled Poland, and afterwards it was also part of Bohemia (Czechia), Prussia and Germany. During World War II, the Germans operated a forced labour camp for Jews and the E608 forced labour subcamp of the Stalag VIII-B/344 prisoner-of-war camp in the village. The village became again part of Poland after the defeat of Nazi Germany in World War II in 1945.
