= Josef Kociok =

German World War II fighter pilot (1918–1943)

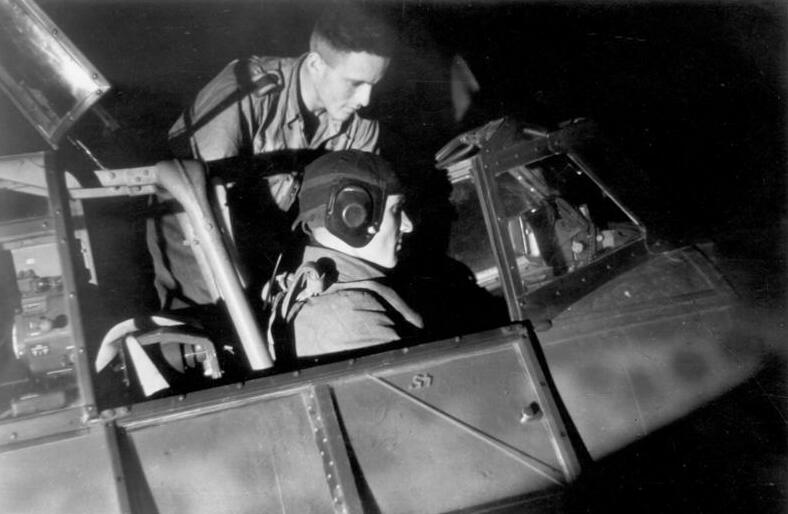
- Feldwebel Josef Kociok in a Bf 110, 1943
- Born: 26 April 1918; Alt Schalkendorf
- Died: 26 September 1943 (aged 25); Kerch, Crimea
- Military career
- Allegiance: Nazi Germany
- Branch: Luftwaffe
- Service years: 1940–1943
- Rank: Leutnant, Posthumously
- Units: ZG 76, SKG 210, ZG 1, NJG 200
- Conflicts: World War II; Eastern Front; Operation Barbarossa
- Awards: Knight's Cross of the Iron Cross

Josef Kociok (26 April 1918 – 26 September 1943) was a German Luftwaffe pilot during World War II and a recipient of the Knight's Cross of the Iron Cross of Nazi Germany. He was killed in an air collision.

== Aerial victory claims ==
Kociok was credited with 33 aerial victories on the Eastern Front, 21 of which were by night, claimed in 200 combat missions. His shooting down of four Polikarpov Po-2s of the famed 46th Guards Night Bomber Aviation Regiment, nicknamed the "Night Witches", (German: Nachthexen), on the night of 31 July 1943, resulted in the entire regiment being grounded for the first time. For this feat, he was nicknamed Hexenjäger, or "Witch Hunter".

Chronicle of aerial victories
| Victory | Date | Time | Type | Location |
– 4./Schnellkampfgeschwader 210 –
| 1 | 25/26 July 1941 | — | SB-2 | Russia |
– 10(N)./Zerstörergeschwader 1 –
| 2 | 25 February 1943 | 09:35 | unknown | |
| 3 | 12 March 1943 | 21:43 | MBR-2 | Russia |
| 4 | 12 March 1943 | 21:45 | DB-3 | Russia |
| 5 | 26 April 1943 | 22:25 | SB-2 | Russia |
| 6 | 26 April 1943 | 22:30 | Yak-4 | Russia |
| 7 | 15 May 1943 | 11:34 | PS-84 | Russia |
| 8 | 15 May 1943 | 21:41 | PS-84 | Russia |
| 9 | 15 May 1943 | 22:05 | SB-2 | Russia |
| 10 | 15 May 1943 | 22:54 | PS-84 | Russia |
| 11 | 16 June 1943 | 21:00 | Boston | Russia |
| 12 | 16 June 1943 | 21:20 | Boston | Russia |
– 10./Nachtjagdgeschwader 200 –
| 13 | 27 July 1943 | 21:20 | R-5 | Russia |
| 14 | 31 July 1943 | Night | Po-2 | Russia |
| 15 | 31 July 1943 | Night | Po-2 | Russia |
| 16 | 31 July 1943 | Night | Po-2 | Russia |
| 17 | 31 July 1943 | Night | Po-2 | Russia |
– 5./Nachtjagdgeschwader 200 –
| 18 | 17 September 1943 | 14:00 | Boston | Russia |
| 19 | 17 September 1943 | 14:01 | Boston | Russia |
| 20 | 17 September 1943 | 14:04 | MiG-1 | Russia |
| 21 | 18 September 1943 | 10:05 | LaGG | Russia |

== Awards ==
- Iron Cross (1939) 2nd and 1st Class
- Honour Goblet of the Luftwaffe (Ehrenpokal der Luftwaffe) on 1 June 1942 as Unteroffizier and pilot
- German Cross in Gold on 2 December 1942 as Feldwebel in the 4./Zerstörergeschwader 1
- Knight's Cross of the Iron Cross on 31 July 1943 as Oberfeldwebel and pilot in the 10.(NJ)/Zerstörergeschwader 1
