= Stare Kolnie =

- Village
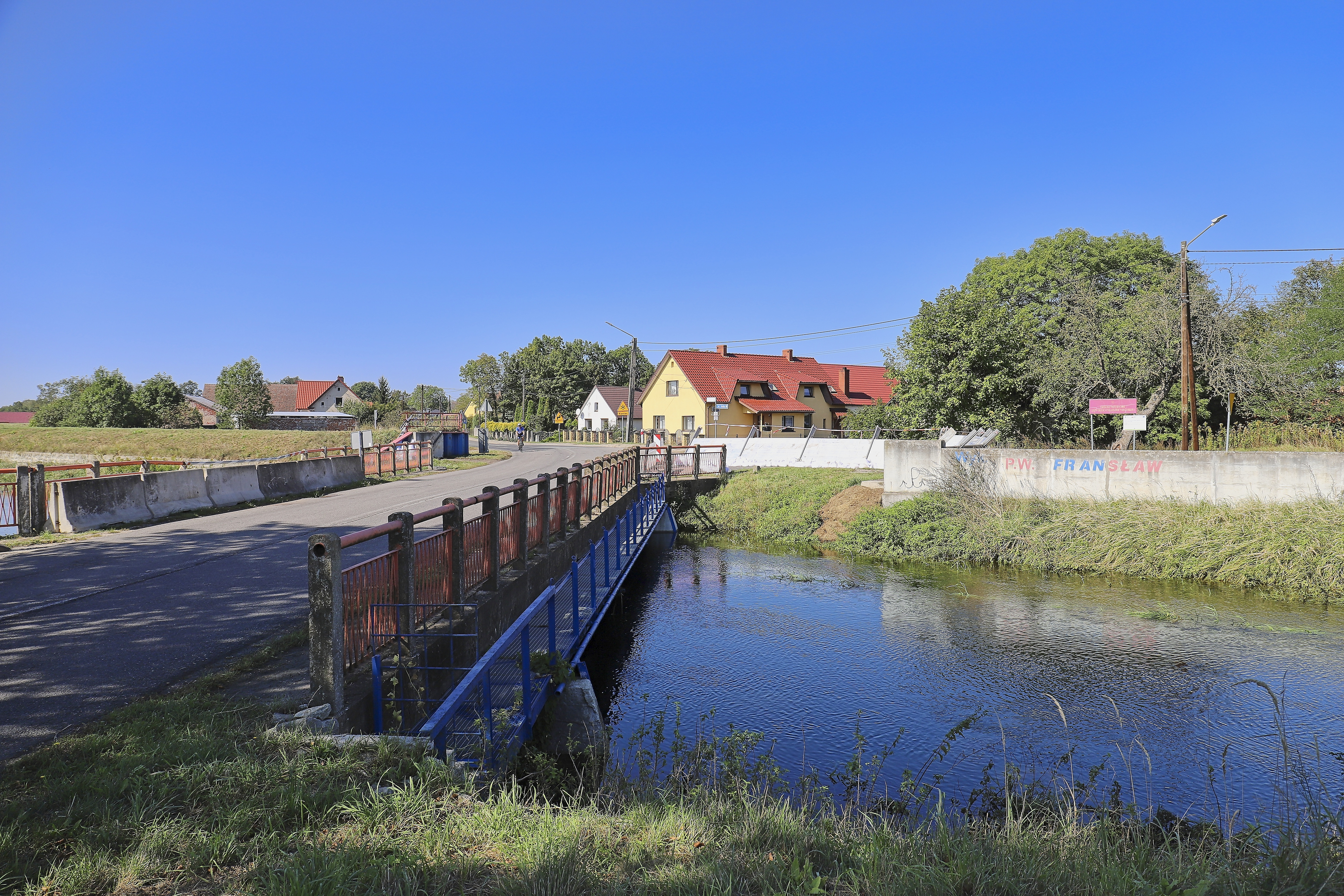

- Location within Poland
- Coordinates: 50°51′N 17°40′E
- Country: Poland
- Voivodeship: Opole
- County: Opole
- Gmina: Popielów

Stare Kolnie [ˈstarɛ ˈkɔlɲɛ] is a village in the administrative district of Gmina Popielów, within Opole County, Opole Voivodeship, in south-western Poland.
