= Jakub Kania (poet) =

Jakub Kania (July 11, 1872 in Stare Siołkowice near Opole – December 3, 1957 in Stare Siołkowice) was a Polish poet, folk writer and national activist. He published in Gazeta Opolska and Katolik. During World War I he fought in the Western front. After the war he took part in the III Silesian Uprising. He was a member of the Union of Poles in Germany and of a Polish-Catholic society "Oświata".

== Bibliography ==
- Stanisław Pigoń, Na drogach kultury ludowej, Warszawa 1974.
