= Dahmer (surname) =

Dahmer is a German surname. People with the surname include:

- André Dahmer (born 1974), Brazilian cartoonist
- Helmut Dahmer (born 1937), German sociologist
- Hugo Dahmer (1918–2006), German Luftwaffe ace
- Jeffrey Dahmer (1960–1994), American serial killer
- Lionel Dahmer (1936–2023), American chemist and writer; father of Jeffrey Dahmer
- John Dahmer (1937–1988), Canadian politician
- Vernon Dahmer (1908–1966), American civil rights activist murdered by the KKK in 1966

== See also ==
- Dahmer (disambiguation)
