= Stobrawa Landscape Park =

Protected area in south-west Poland

Coordinates: 50°52′55″N 17°49′55″E

- Stobrawski Park Krajobrazowy
- IUCN category V (protected landscape/seascape)
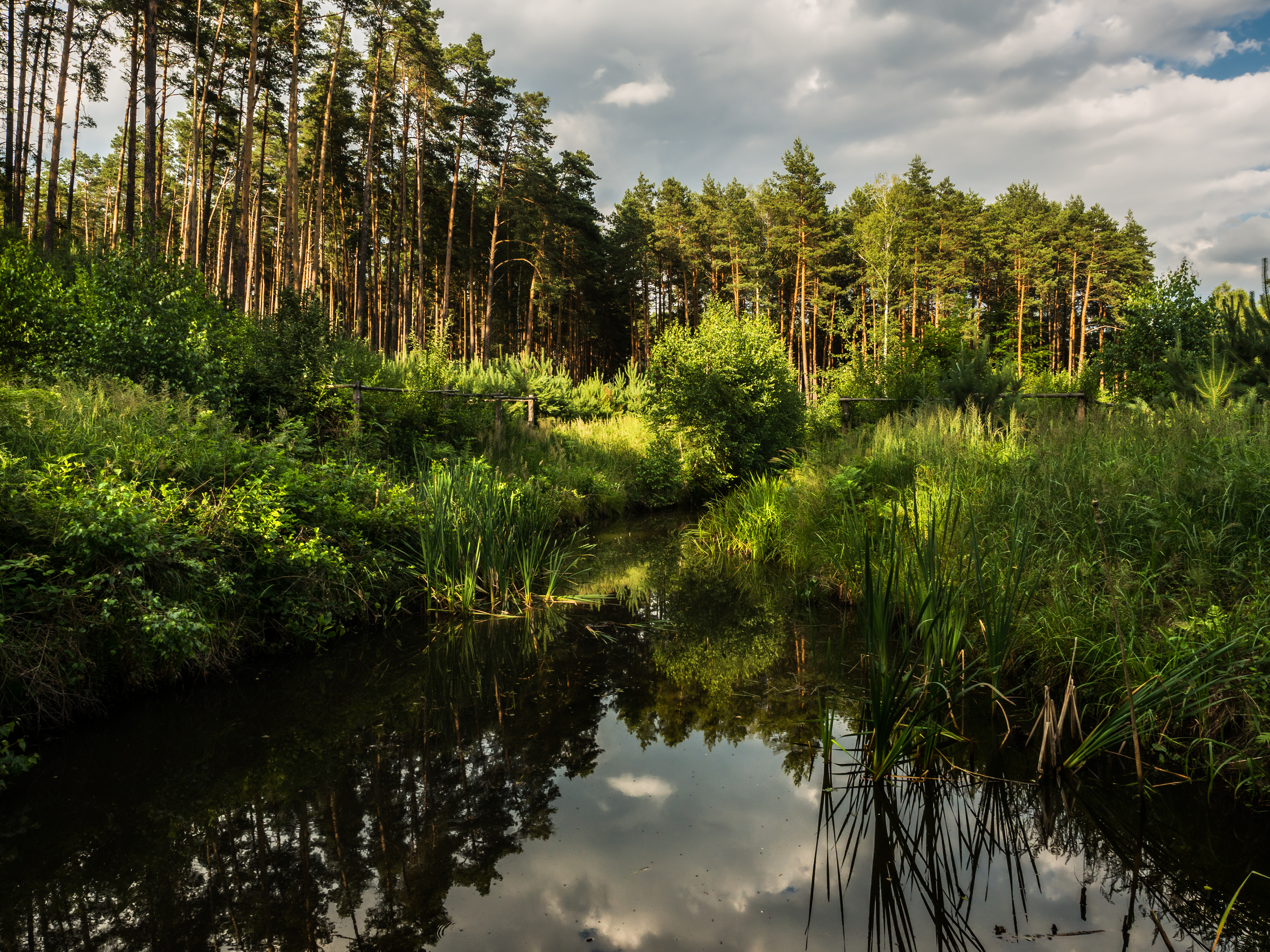
- Park in 2016.
- Interactive map of Stobrawa Landscape Park
- Location: Opole Voivodeship
- Area: 526 km^{2} (203 sq mi)
- Established: 1999

Stobrawa Landscape Park (Stobrawski Park Krajobrazowy; Silesian: Park Landszafny Stobrawa) is a protected area (Landscape Park) in south-western Poland, established in 1999, covering an area of 526 square kilometres (203 sq mi) in the region of the Stobrawa river. About 250 protected animals live in the park along with about 130 species of rare plants.

The Park lies within Opole Voivodeship: in Brzeg County (Gmina Lewin Brzeski, Gmina Lubsza), Kluczbork County (Gmina Kluczbork, Gmina Lasowice Wielkie, Gmina Wołczyn), Namysłów County (Gmina Pokój, Gmina Świerczów) and Opole County (Gmina Dąbrowa, Gmina Dobrzeń Wielki, Gmina Łubniany, Gmina Murów, Gmina Popielów).
