= Kurznie =

- Village
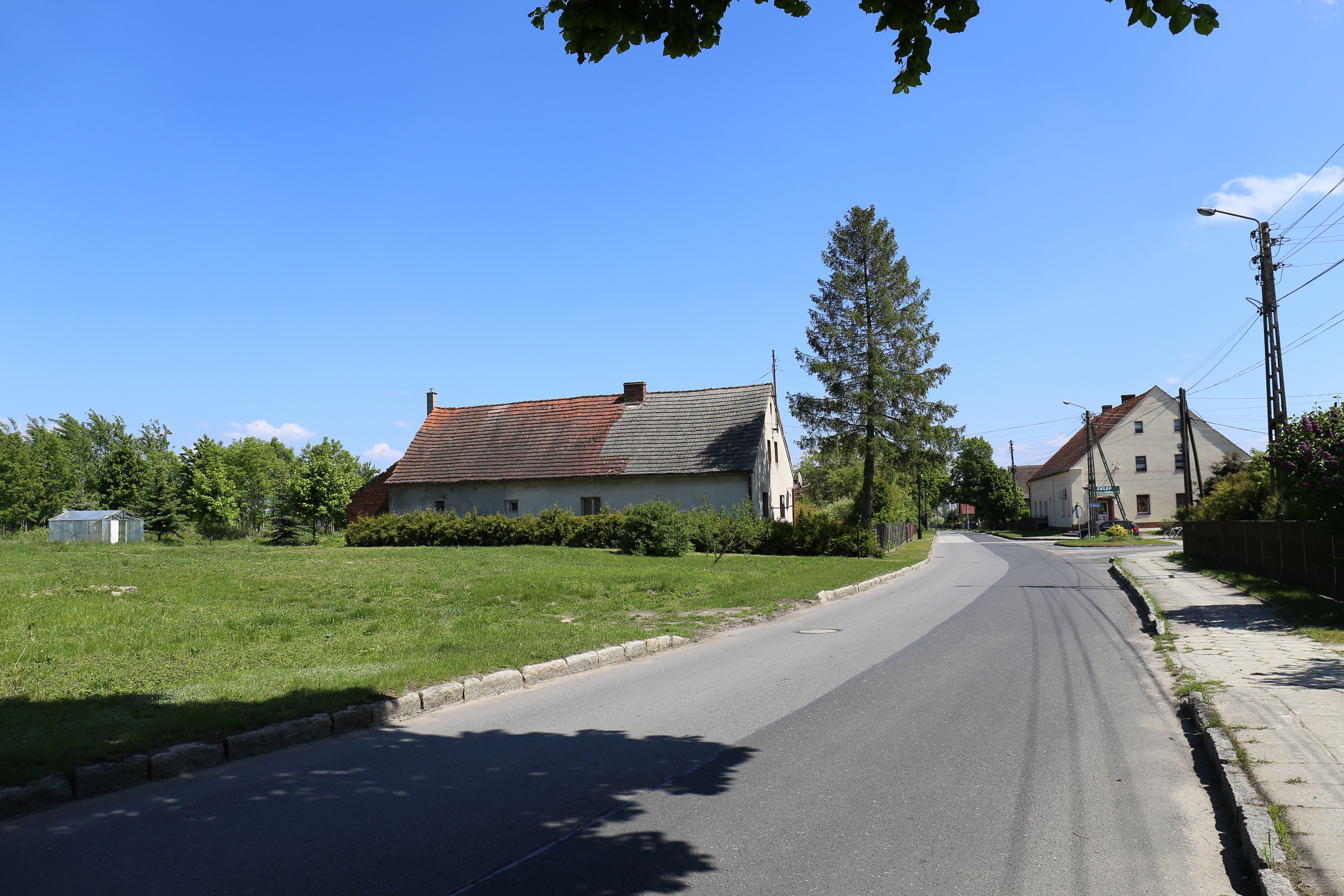

- Location within Poland
- Coordinates: 50°53′15″N 17°40′01″E
- Country: Poland
- Voivodeship: Opole
- County: Opole
- Gmina: Popielów

Kurznie [ˈkuʐɲɛ] is a village in the administrative district of Gmina Popielów, within Opole County, Opole Voivodeship, in south-western Poland.
