= Dammers =

Dammers is a surname. Notable people with the surname include:

- Elly Dammers, Dutch javelin thrower
- Hans Dammers (1913–1944), German World War II fighter ace
- Horace Dammers, English religious leader and writer
- Jerry Dammers (born 1955), English musician

== See also ==
- Dahmer (disambiguation)
- Dammer (disambiguation)
