= Lubienia, Opole Voivodeship =

Lubienia
- Village
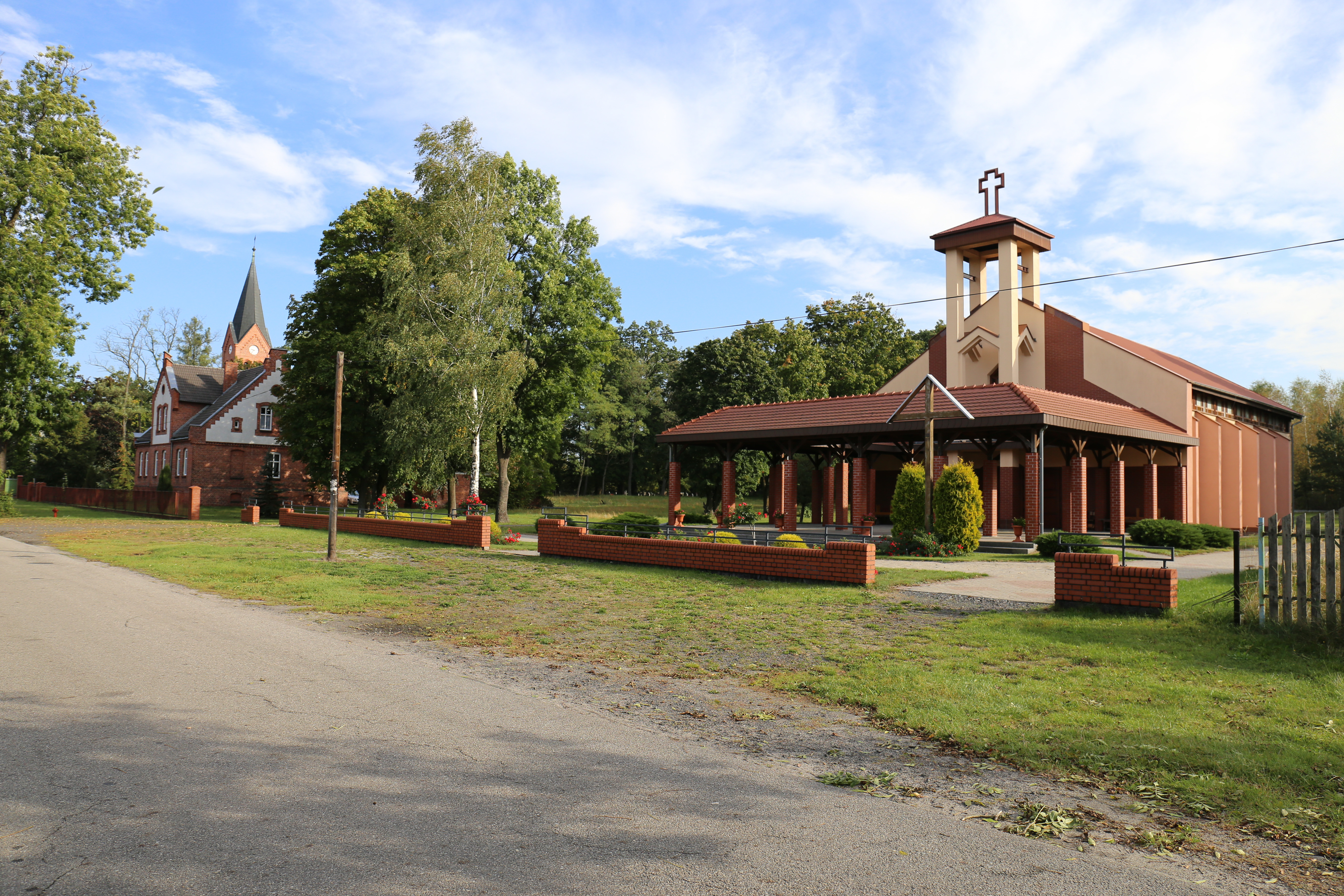

- Location within Poland
- Coordinates: 50°50′28″N 17°46′31″E
- Country: Poland
- Voivodeship: Opole
- County: Opole
- Gmina: Popielów
- Population: 408

Lubienia [luˈbjɛɲa] is a village in the administrative district of Gmina Popielów, within Opole County, Opole Voivodeship, in south-western Poland.
