= Starościn, Opole Voivodeship =

Starościn
- Village
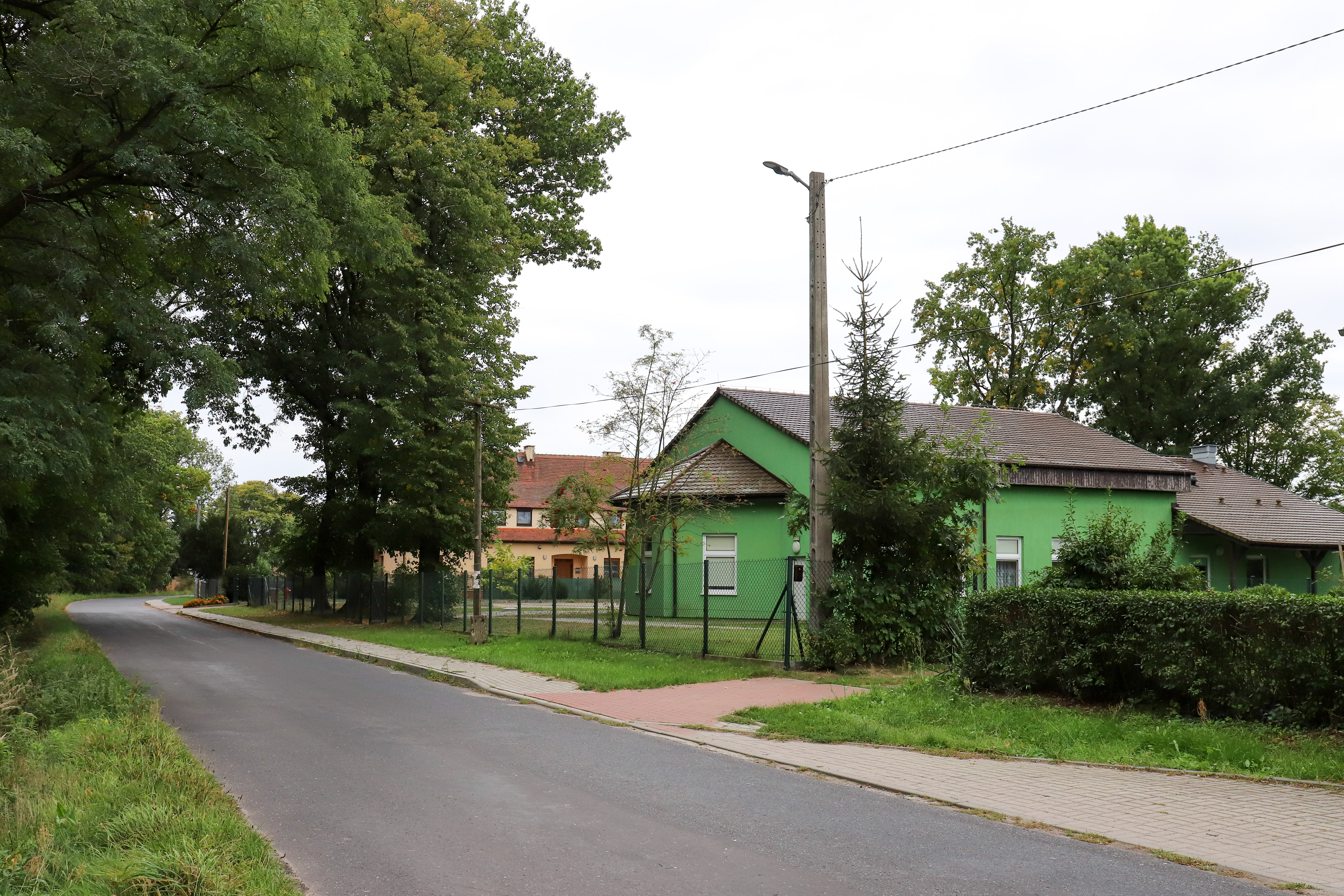
- Street in Starościn in 2021

- Location within Poland
- Coordinates: 50°59′48″N 17°49′33″E
- Country: Poland
- Voivodeship: Opole
- County: Namysłów
- Gmina: Świerczów

Starościn [staˈrɔɕt͡ɕin] is a village in the administrative district of Gmina Świerczów, within Namysłów County, Opole Voivodeship, in south-western Poland.
