= Bąkowice =

- Village
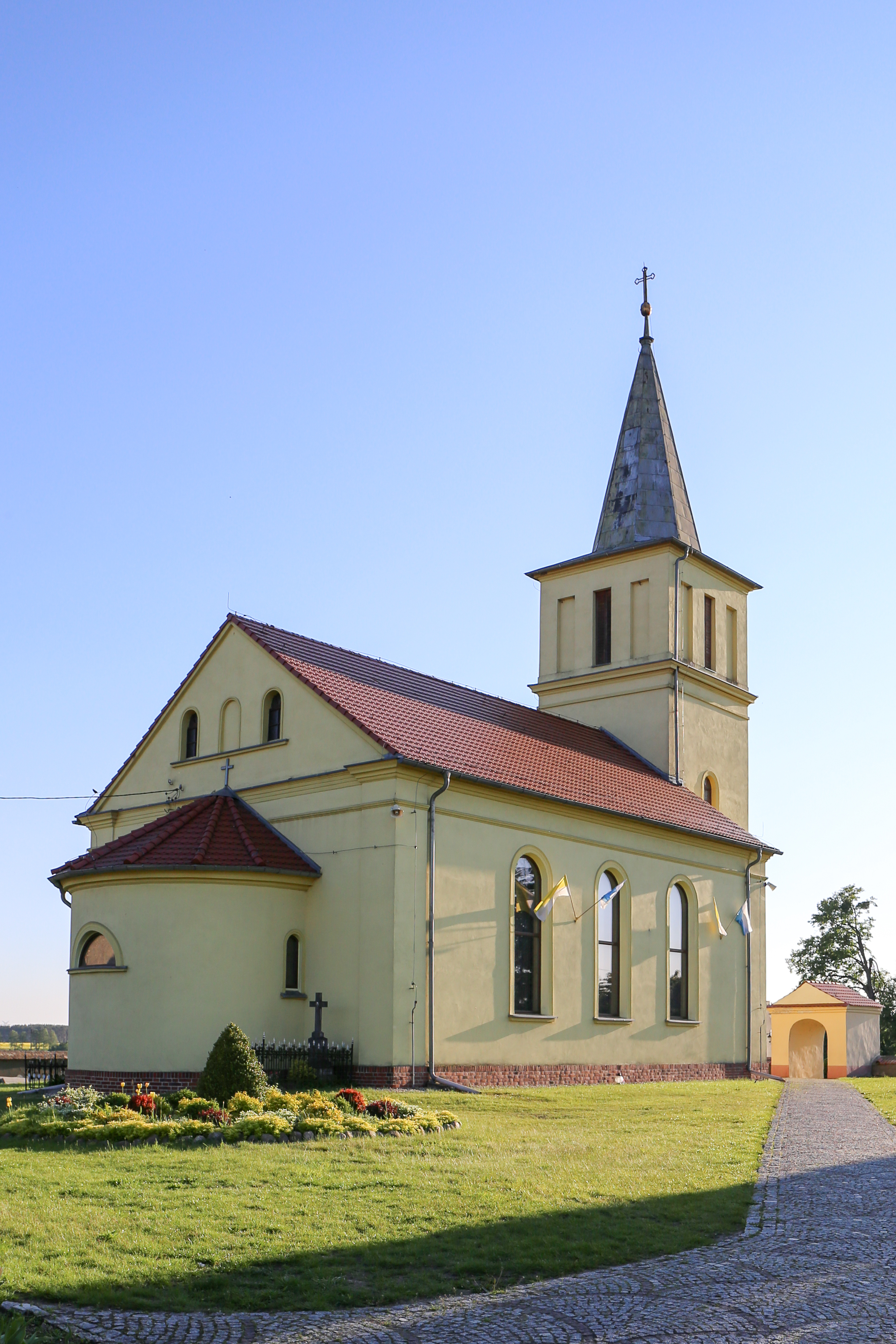
- Saint Anne church in Bąkowice in 2019

- Location within Poland
- Coordinates: 50°56′N 17°42′E
- Country: Poland
- Voivodeship: Opole
- County: Namysłów
- Gmina: Świerczów

Bąkowice [bɔnkɔˈvit͡sɛ] is a village in the administrative district of Gmina Świerczów, within Namysłów County, Opole Voivodeship, in south-western Poland.

== Immovable sites ==
There are two sites listed on the National Institute of Cultural Heritage's listings. Saint Anne church, constructed around 1837–39, was added 4 February 1966. The village's manor complex, with parts constructed in the 19th and 20th centuries, has two contributing properties listed. Both the manor itself and the surrounding park area were first added to the listing in 1950.
