= Łowkowice, Kluczbork County =

Łowkowice
- Village
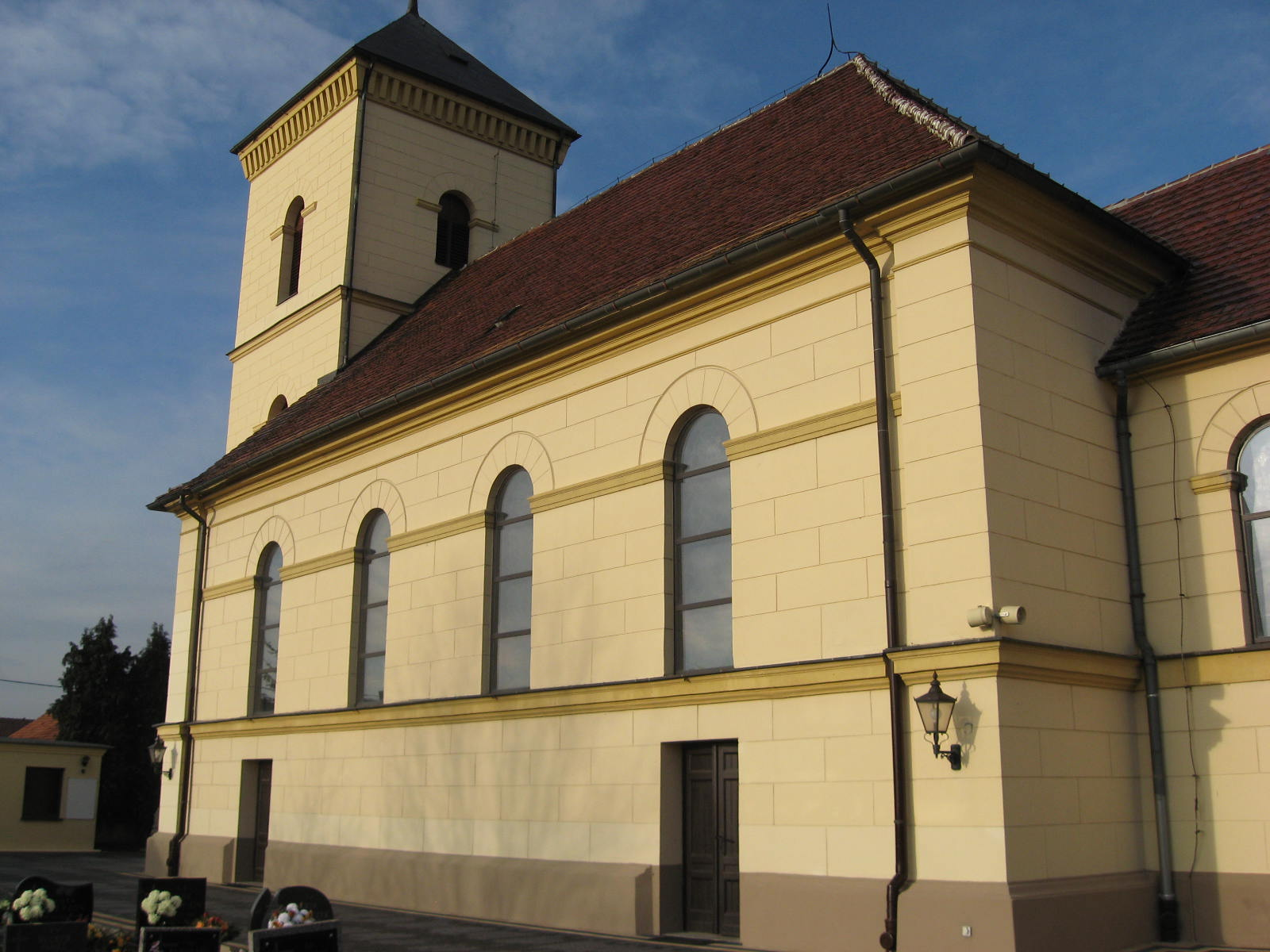
- Church of the Visitation in Łowkowice

- Location within Poland
- Coordinates: 51°2′12″N 18°14′40″E
- Country: Poland
- Voivodeship: Opole
- County: Kluczbork
- Gmina: Kluczbork
- Time zone: UTC+1 (CET)
  - Summer (DST): UTC+2 (CEST)
- Area code: +48 77
- Vehicle registration: OKL

Łowkowice [wɔfkɔˈvit͡sɛ] is a village in Kluczbork County in Opole Voivodeship in southern Poland.

== History ==
The village was mentioned in 1253, when it was part of medieval Piast-ruled Poland. The name of the village is of Polish origin and refers to hunting.

While part of the Prussian Province of Silesia under the Germanized name Lowkowitz, the village was the place of birth and death of the Polish apiarist Jan Dzierżon (1811–1906), the discoverer of parthenogenesis among bees.

In 1936, Nazi Germany renamed the village Bienendorf (German for "Bee Village") and kept the name until 1945. After Germany's defeat in World War II in 1945, the village was part of the region that became again part of Poland under the terms of the Potsdam Agreement. It was then renamed to the historical Polish name Łowkowice. Poland renamed the nearby town of Rychbach Dzierżoniów in Dzierżon's honor.
