= Gmina Świerczów =

Gmina Świerczów Świerczów Commune
- Gmina
- Flag Coat of arms
- Interactive map of Gmina Świerczów
- Coordinates (Świerczów): 50°57′N 17°45′E
- Country: Poland
- Voivodeship: Opole
- County: Namysłów
- Seat: Świerczów

Area
  - Total: 110.32 km^{2} (42.59 sq mi)

Population (2019-06-30)
  - Total: 3,317
  - Density: 30.07/km^{2} (77.87/sq mi)
- Website: http://www.swierczow.pl

Gmina Świerczów is a rural gmina (administrative district) in Namysłów County, Opole Voivodeship, in south-western Poland. Its seat is the village of Świerczów, which lies approximately 14 kilometres (9 mi) south of Namysłów and 34 km (21 mi) north of the regional capital Opole.

The gmina covers an area of 110.32 square kilometres (42.6 sq mi), and as of 2019 its total population is 3,317.

The gmina contains part of the protected area called Stobrawa Landscape Park.

== Villages ==
Gmina Świerczów contains the villages and settlements of Bąkowice, Bielice, Biestrzykowice, Dąbrowa, Gola, Grodziec, Kuźnica Dąbrowska, Miejsce, Miodary, Pieczyska, Starościn, Świerczów, Wężowice and Zbica.

== Neighbouring gminas ==
Gmina Świerczów is bordered by the gminas of Domaszowice, Lubsza, Namysłów, Pokój and Popielów.
