= Biestrzykowice =

- Village
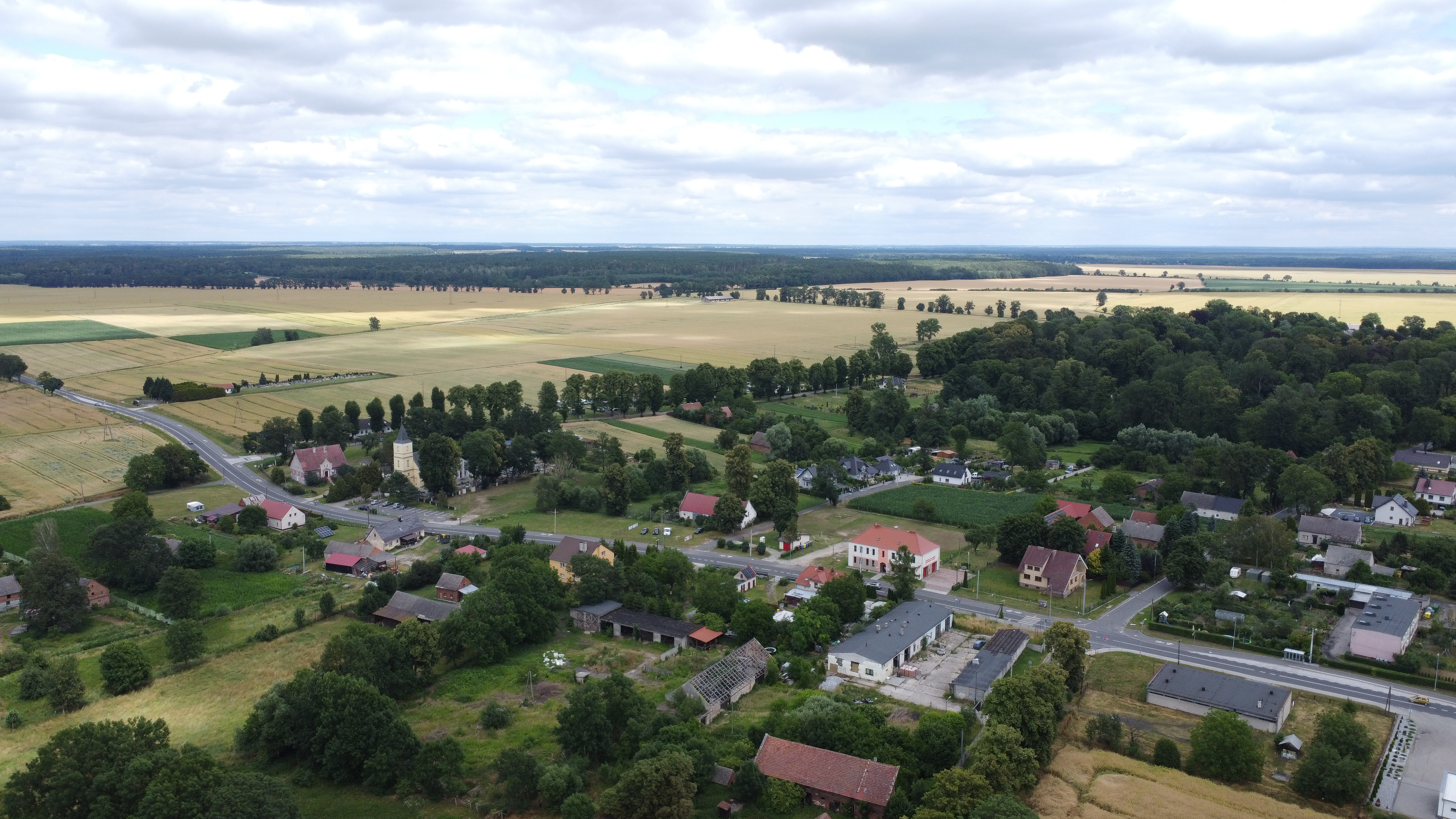
- Aerial view of Biestrzykowice in 2022

- Location within Poland
- Coordinates: 50°59′N 17°46′E
- Country: Poland
- Voivodeship: Opole
- County: Namysłów
- Gmina: Świerczów

Biestrzykowice [bjɛstʂɨkɔˈvit͡sɛ] is a village in the administrative district of Gmina Świerczów, within Namysłów County, Opole Voivodeship, in south-western Poland.

== Immovable sites ==
There are two sites listed on the National Institute of Cultural Heritage's registry. The church of the Assumption of the Blessed Virgin Mary was built of wood in 1639, with masonry elements, including a belltower, added in 1839. It was added to the listing on 4 February 1966. The village palace complex was added on 20 January 1966. Elements of the complex were built between the 18th and 20th centuries.
