= Grodziec, Namysłów County =

Grodziec
- Village
- Location within Poland
- Coordinates: 50°56′47″N 17°40′39″E
- Country: Poland
- Voivodeship: Opole
- County: Namysłów
- Gmina: Świerczów

Grodziec [ˈɡrɔd͡ʑɛt͡s] is a village in the administrative district of Gmina Świerczów, within Namysłów County, Opole Voivodeship, in south-western Poland.
