= Dahmer (disambiguation) =

Jeffrey Dahmer (1960–1994) was an American serial killer and sex offender charged with 17 counts of murder and sentenced to 941 years.

Dahmer may also refer to:

- Dahmer, West Virginia, an unincorporated community in the U.S.
- Dahmer (surname), including a list of people with the surname
- Dahmer (film), a 2002 American biographical true-crime horror film about Jeffrey Dahmer
- Dahmer (album), a 2000 concept album by Macabre about Jeffrey Dahmer
- Dahmer – Monster: The Jeffrey Dahmer Story, a 2022 American limited series about Jeffrey Dahmer
- Cable Dahmer Arena, an indoor arena in Independence, Missouri

== See also ==
- Dammer (disambiguation)
- Dammers (disambiguation)
