= Popielowska Kolonia =

Polish village in Opole Voivodeship

- Village
- Location within Poland
- Coordinates: 50°48′19.41″N 17°42′9.59″E
- Country: Poland
- Voivodeship: Opole
- County: Opole
- Gmina: Popielów

Popielowska Kolonia [pɔpjɛˈlɔfska kɔˈlɔɲa] is a village in the administrative district of Gmina Popielów, within Opole County, Opole Voivodeship, in south-western Poland.
