= Stobrawa, Opole Voivodeship =

Stobrawa
- Village
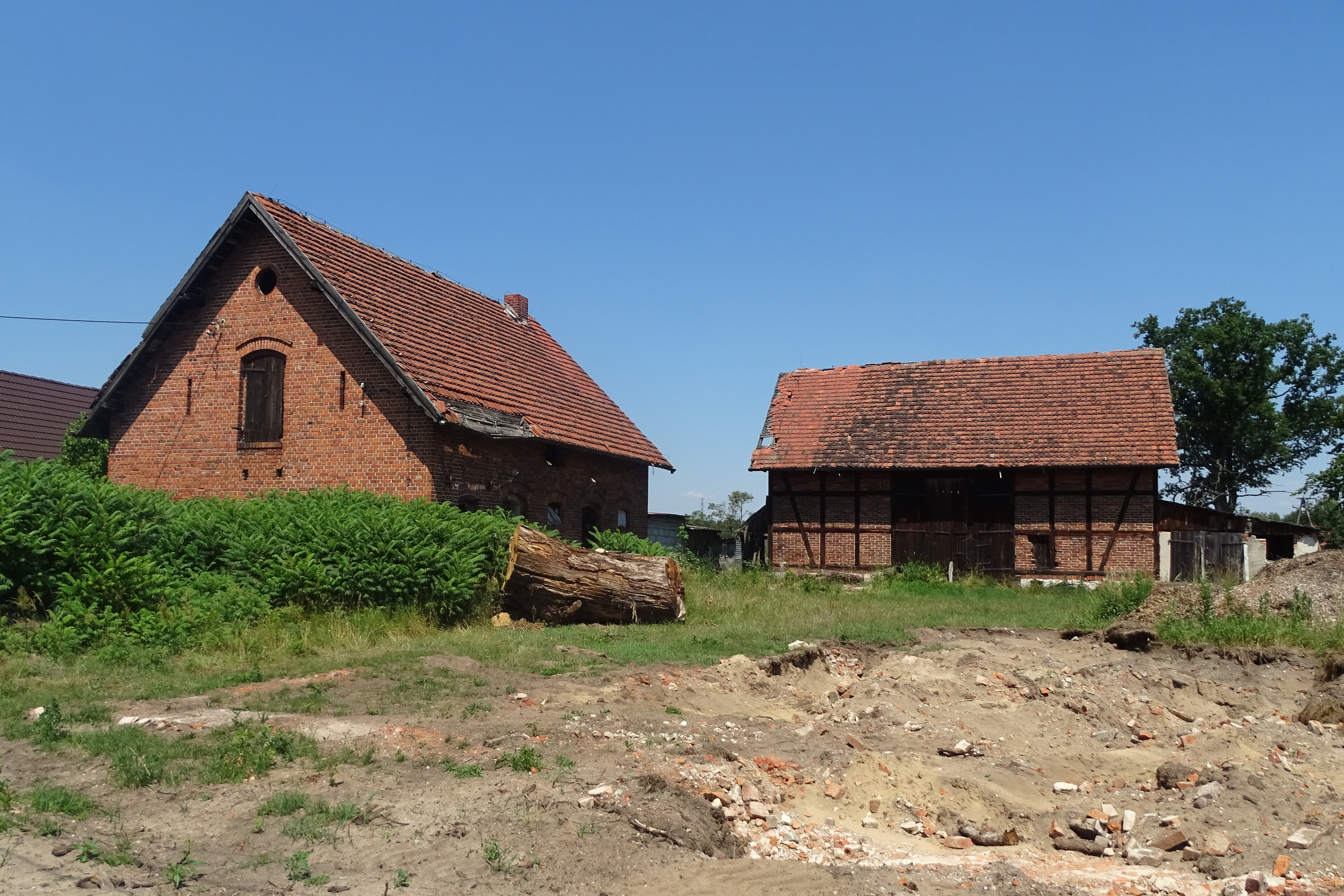

- Location within Poland
- Coordinates: 50°52′N 17°38′E
- Country: Poland
- Voivodeship: Opole
- County: Opole
- Gmina: Popielów

Stobrawa [stɔˈbrava] is a village in the administrative district of Gmina Popielów, within Opole County, Opole Voivodeship, in south-western Poland.

The village lies on the Stobrawa river, within the protected area called Stobrawa Landscape Park.
