= Gola, Namysłów County =

Gola
- Village
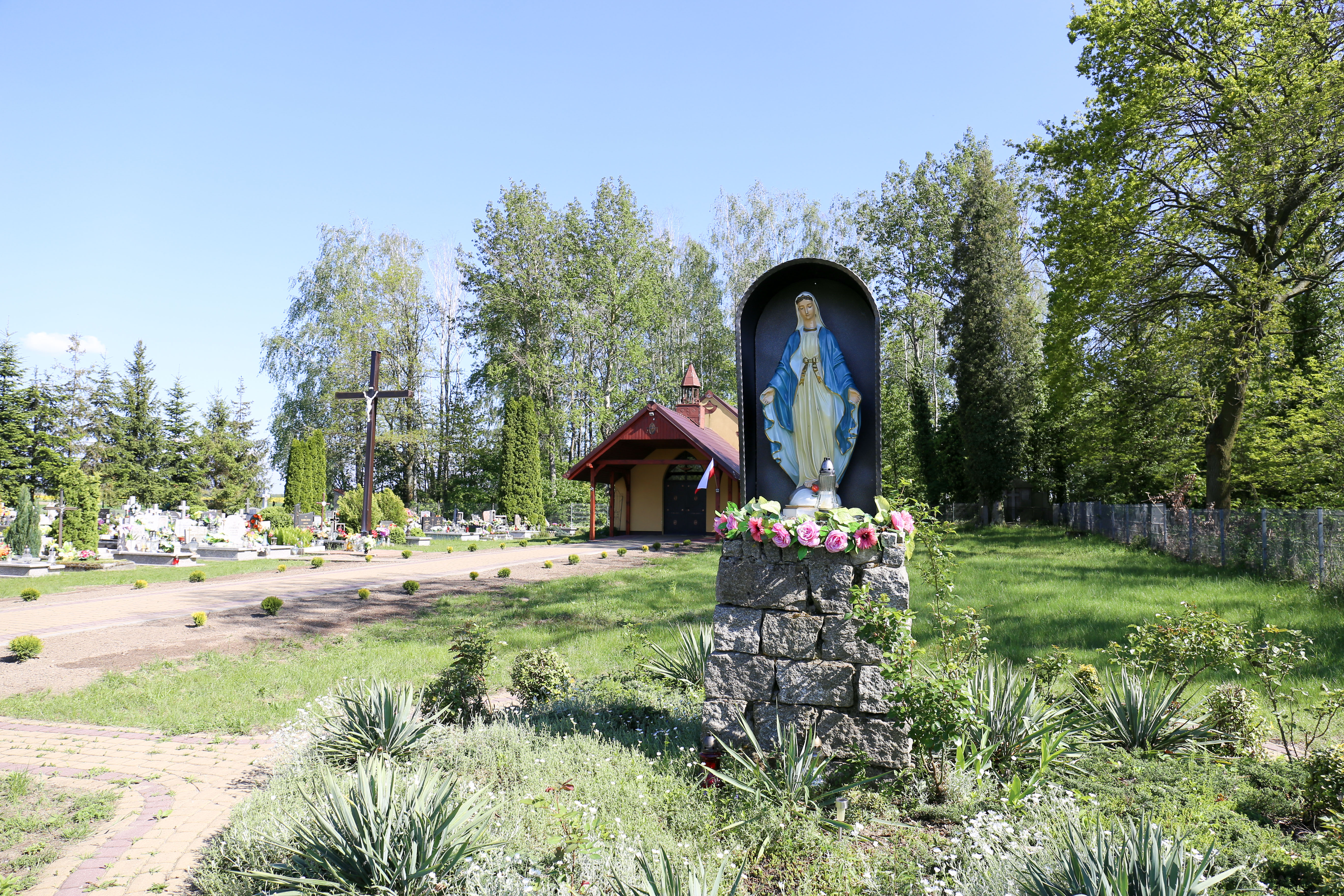
- Divine Mercy chapel and cemetery in Gola in 2019

- Location within Poland
- Coordinates: 50°57′N 17°42′E
- Country: Poland
- Voivodeship: Opole
- County: Namysłów
- Gmina: Świerczów

Gola [ˈɡɔla] is a village in the administrative district of Gmina Świerczów, within Namysłów County, Opole Voivodeship, in south-western Poland.
