= Miodary, Opole Voivodeship =

Miodary
- Village
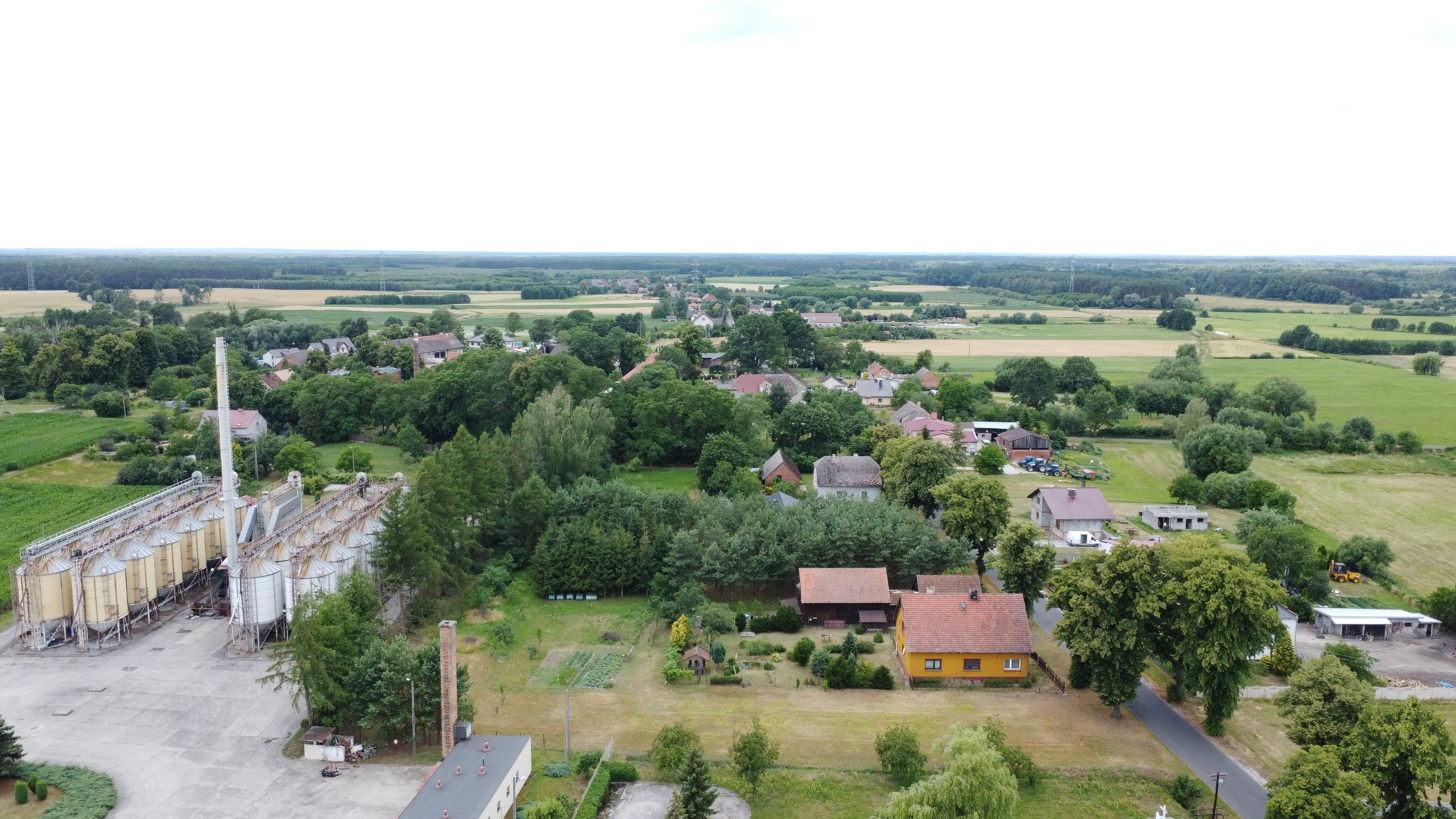
- Aerial view of Miodary in 2022

- Location within Poland
- Coordinates: 51°0′N 17°44′E
- Country: Poland
- Voivodeship: Opole
- County: Namysłów
- Gmina: Świerczów

Miodary [mjɔˈdarɨ] is a village in the administrative district of Gmina Świerczów, within Namysłów County, Opole Voivodeship, in south-western Poland.
