= Bielice, Namysłów County =

Bielice
- Village
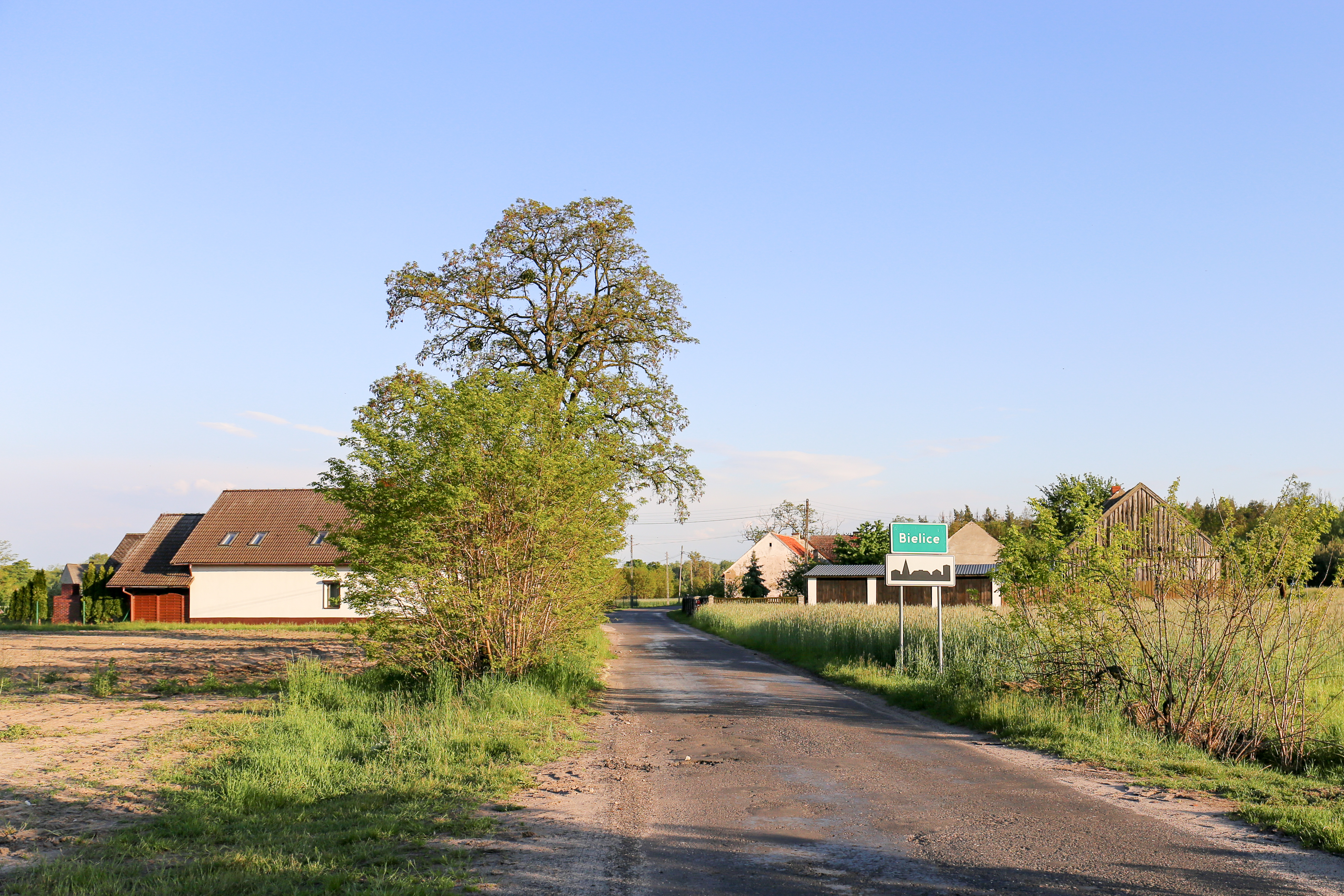
- Street in Bielice in 2019

- Location within Poland
- Coordinates: 50°56′N 17°44′E
- Country: Poland
- Voivodeship: Opole
- County: Namysłów
- Gmina: Świerczów

Bielice [bjɛˈlit͡sɛ] is a village in the administrative district of Gmina Świerczów, within Namysłów County, Opole Voivodeship, in south-western Poland.
