= Rybna, Opole Voivodeship =

Rybna
- Village
- Location within Poland
- Coordinates: 50°49′N 17°41′E
- Country: Poland
- Voivodeship: Opole
- County: Opole
- Gmina: Popielów

Rybna [ˈrɨbna] is a village in the administrative district of Gmina Popielów, within Opole County, Opole Voivodeship, in south-western Poland.
