= Stare Siołkowice =

- Village
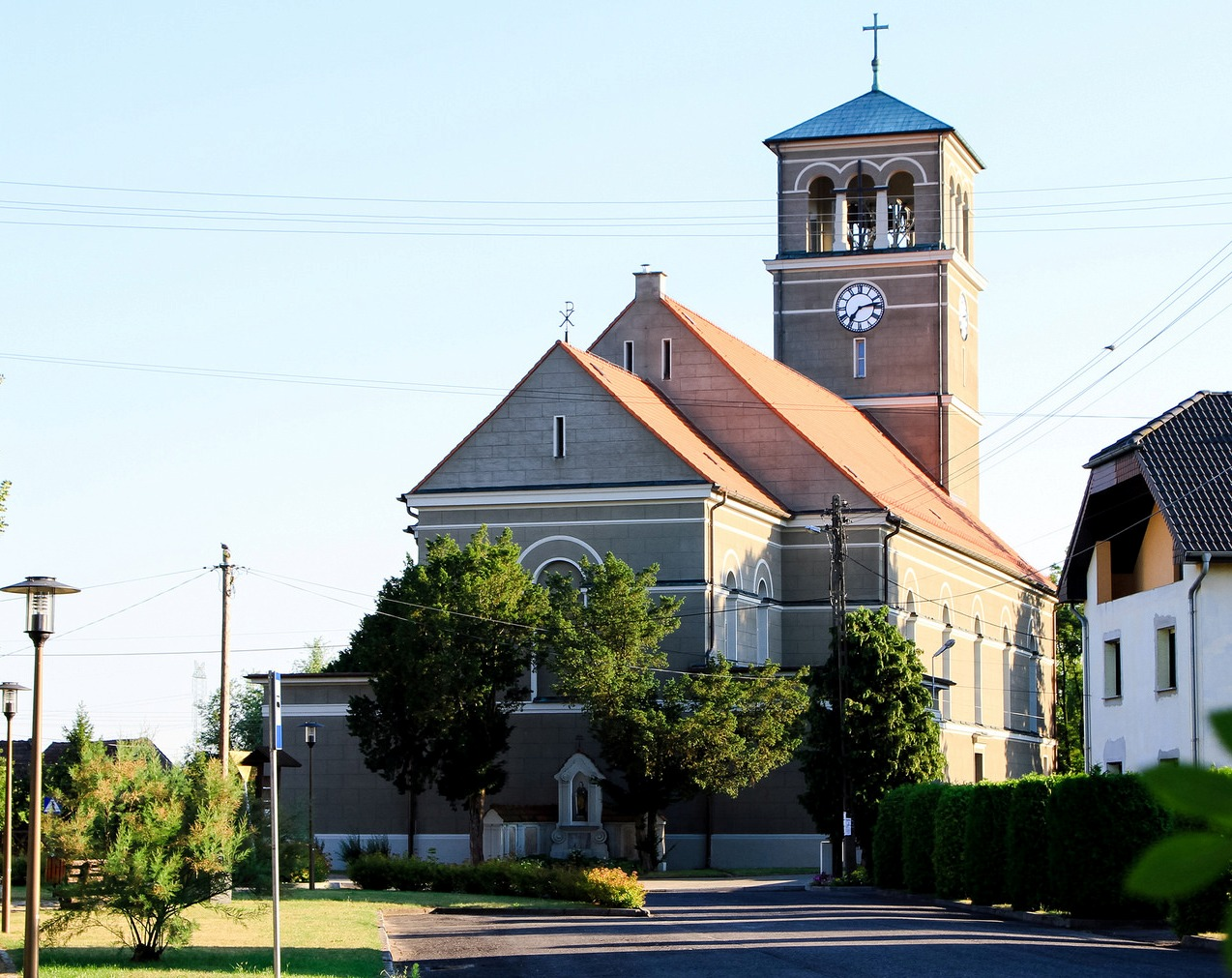
- Catholic church

- Location within Poland
- Coordinates: 50°48′N 17°46′E
- Country: Poland
- Voivodeship: Opole
- County: Opole
- Gmina: Popielów
- Website: http://www.siolkowice.pl

Stare Siołkowice [ˈstarɛ ɕɔu̯kɔˈvit͡sɛ] ("old Siołkowice") is a village in the administrative district of Gmina Popielów, within Opole County, Opole Voivodeship, in south-western Poland.

== Notable people ==
- Rochus Misch (1917–2013), member of 1st SS Panzer Division Leibstandarte SS Adolf Hitler and radio operator at Adolf Hitler's Führerbunker. The last witness of Hitler's downfall.
- Josef Kociok (1918–1943), Luftwaffe ace pilot.
