= Dąbrowa, Namysłów County =

Dąbrowa
- Village
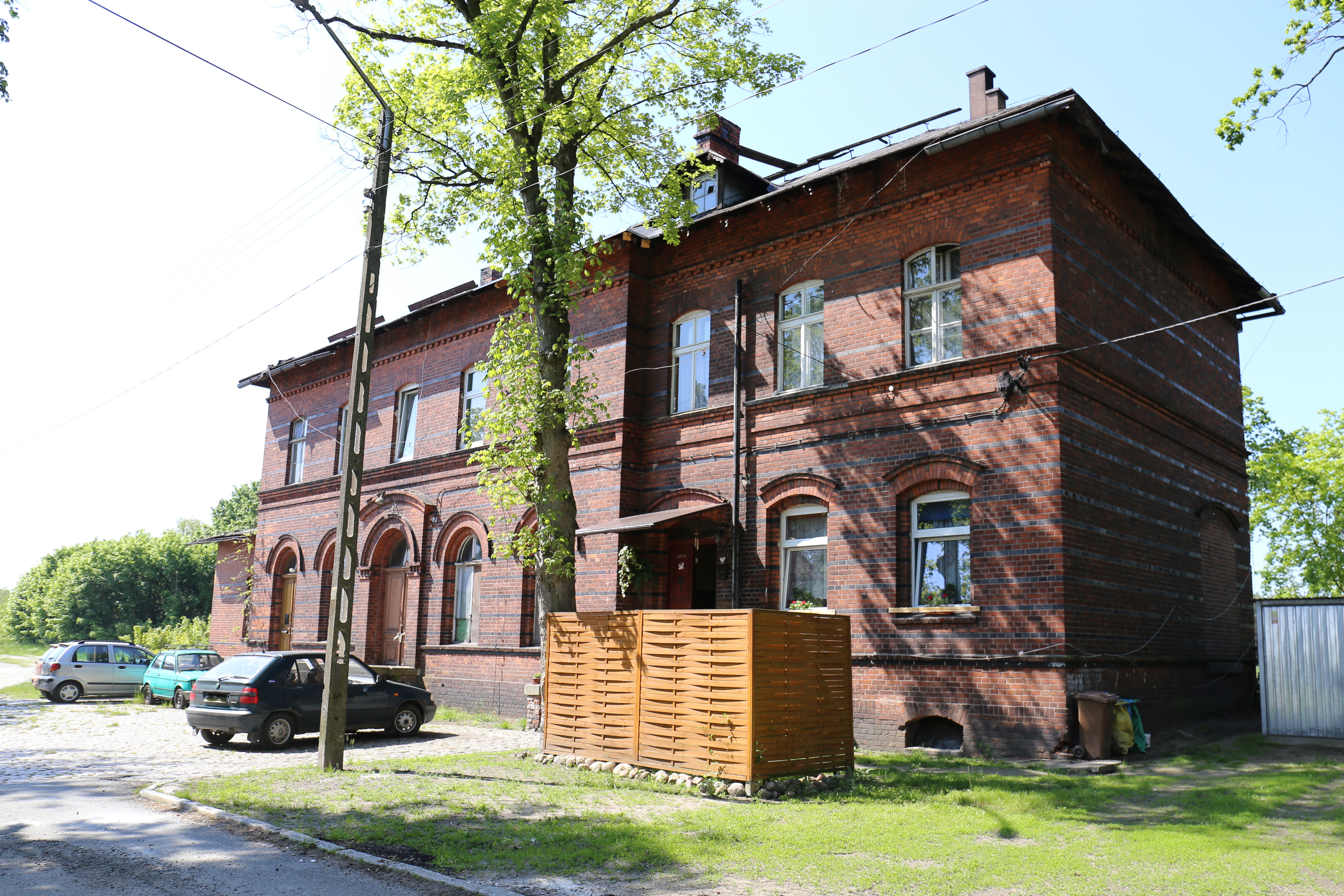
- Railway station in Dąbrowa in 2019

- Location within Poland
- Coordinates: 50°58′17″N 17°48′06″E
- Country: Poland
- Voivodeship: Opole
- County: Namysłów
- Gmina: Świerczów

Dąbrowa [dɔmˈbrɔva] is a village in the administrative district of Gmina Świerczów, within Namysłów County, Opole Voivodeship, in south-western Poland.
