= Karłowice, Opole Voivodeship =

Karłowice
- Village
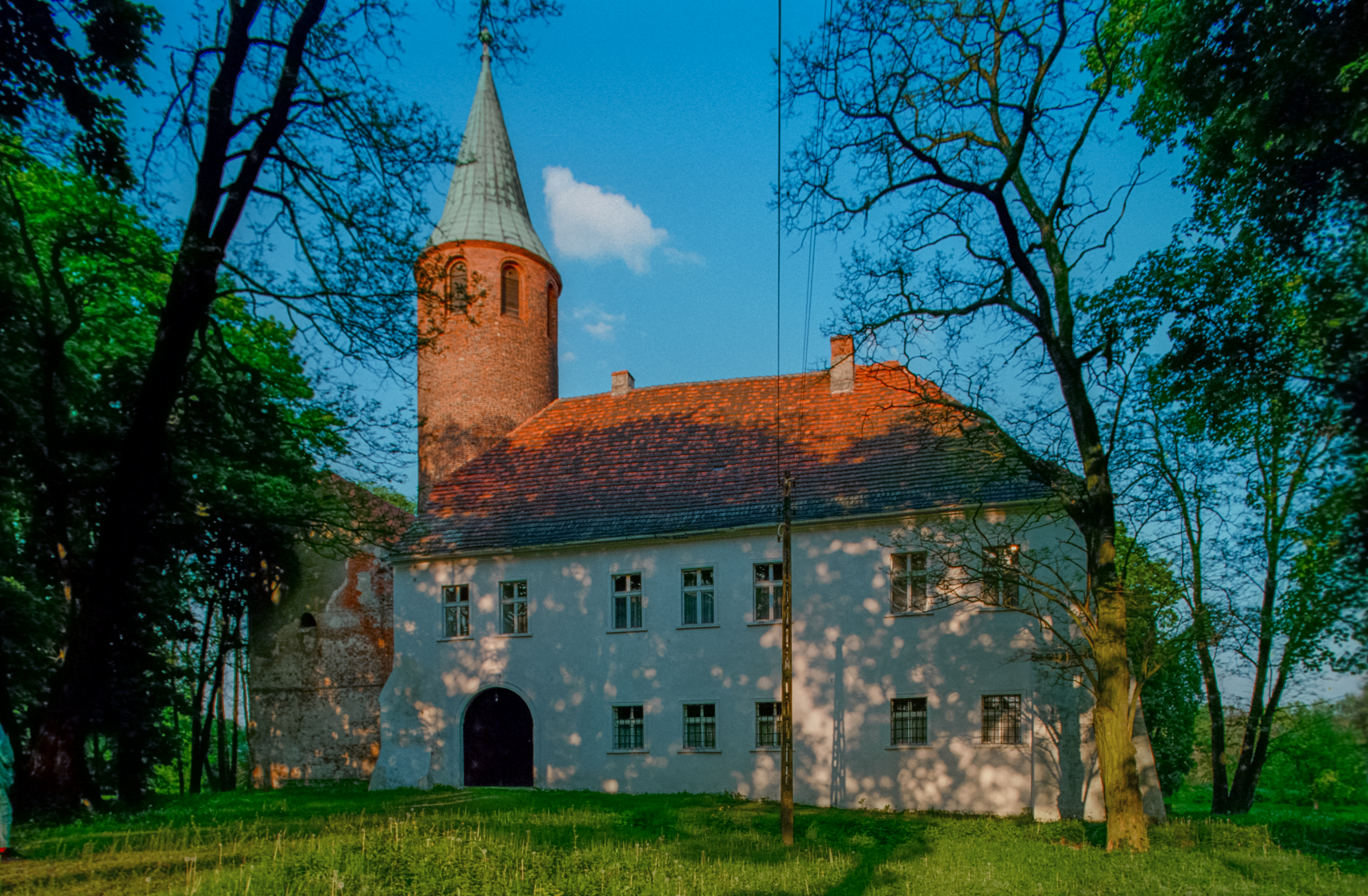
- Castle

- Location within Poland
- Coordinates: 50°53′N 17°43′E
- Country: Poland
- Voivodeship: Opole
- County: Opole
- Gmina: Popielów

Karłowice [karwɔˈvit͡sɛ] is a village in the administrative district of Gmina Popielów, within Opole County, Opole Voivodeship, in south-western Poland.
