= Nowe Siołkowice =

- Village
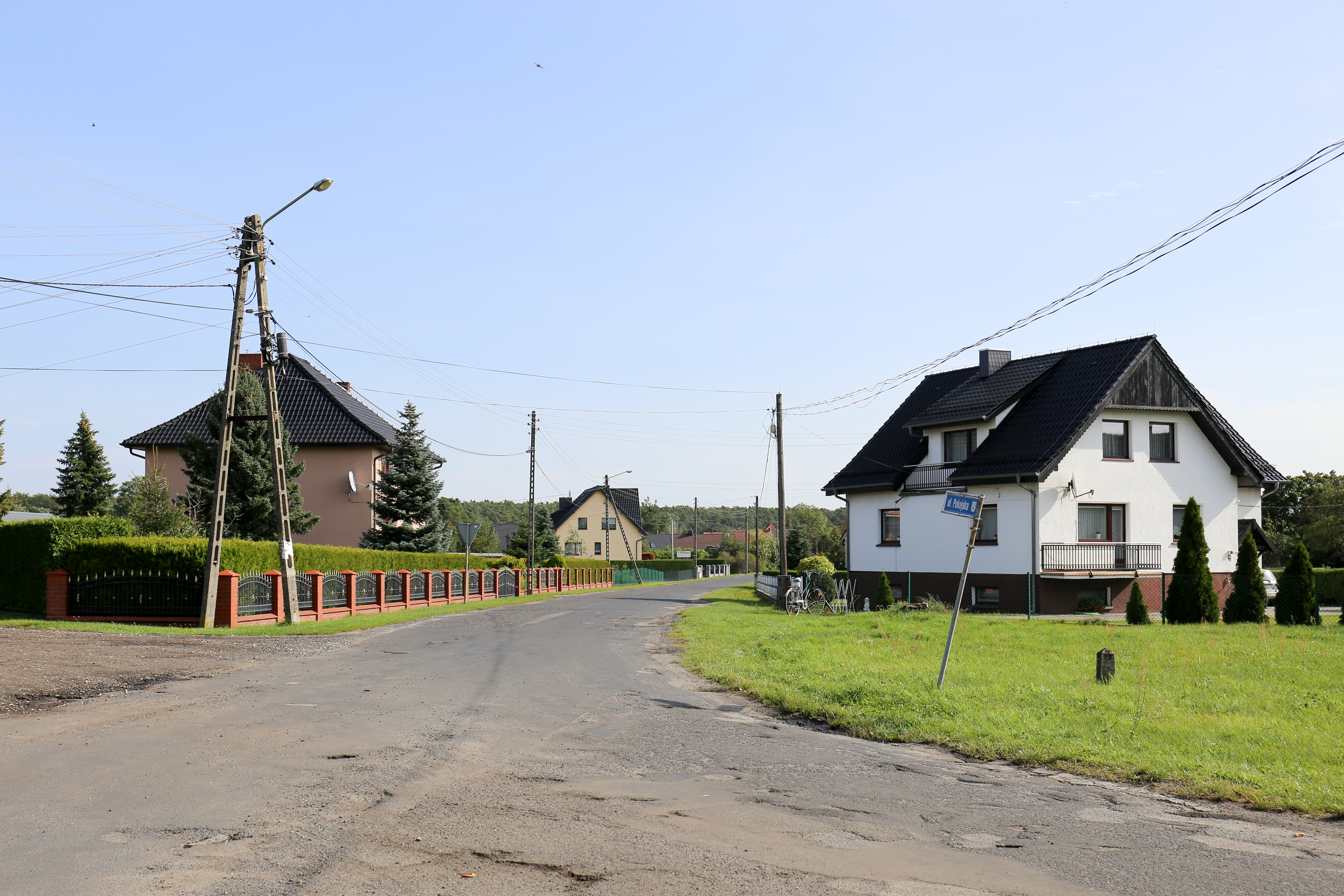

- Location within Poland
- Coordinates: 50°50′N 17°47′E
- Country: Poland
- Voivodeship: Opole
- County: Opole
- Gmina: Popielów

Nowe Siołkowice [ˈnɔvɛ ɕɔu̯kɔˈvit͡sɛ] is a village in the administrative district of Gmina Popielów, within Opole County, Opole Voivodeship, in south-western Poland.
