= Popielów, Opole Voivodeship =

Popielów
- Village
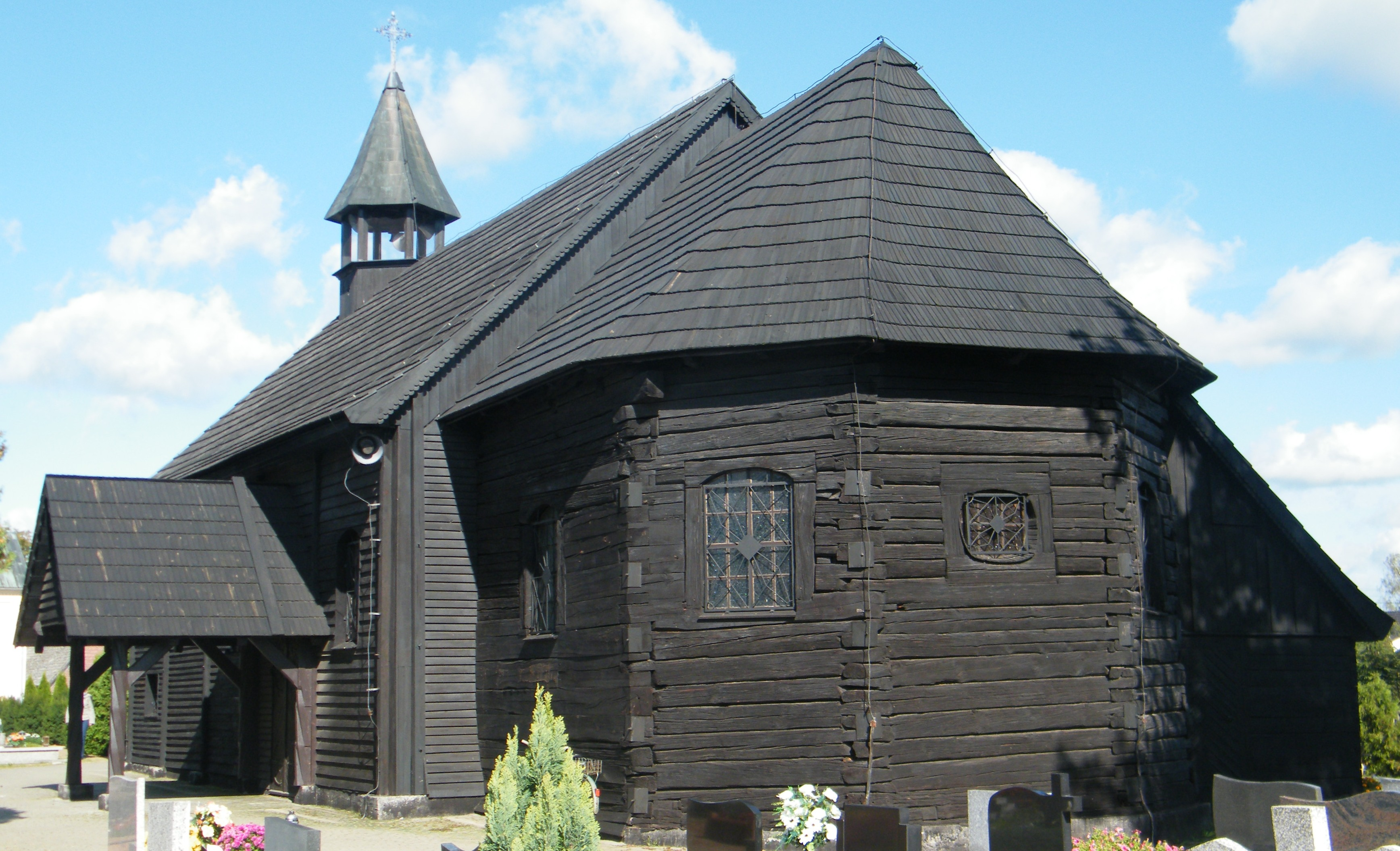
- Saint Andrew church

- Location within Poland
- Coordinates: 50°49′33″N 17°44′31″E
- Country: Poland
- Voivodeship: Opole
- County: Opole
- Gmina: Popielów
- First mentioned: 1286

Population
  - Total: 2,400
- Time zone: UTC+1 (CET)
  - Summer (DST): UTC+2 (CEST)
- Vehicle registration: OPO

Popielów [pɔˈpjɛluf] is a village in Opole County, Opole Voivodeship, in south-western Poland. It is the seat of the gmina (administrative district) called Gmina Popielów.

== History ==
The oldest known mention of the village comes from 1286. Its name comes from the Polish word popiół, which means "ash". It was part of Piast-ruled Poland, and the local Roman Catholic parish was mentioned in documents in the late 13th century. Later on, the village passed to Bohemia (Czechia), and it was devastated in the Thirty Years' War.

In the 18th century it was annexed by Prussia and from 1871 to 1945 it was also part of Germany. During World War II, the Germans operated two forced labour subcamps (E608, E703) of the Stalag VIII-B/344 prisoner-of-war camp in the village. On 21 July 1944, a German guard killed two British POWs, John Thomas Sanders and Henry Alexander Thomson, now buried at a local cemetery. The village was restored to Poland after the defeat of Nazi Germany in World War II in 1945.

== Sports ==
The local football club is LZS Popielów. It competes in the lower leagues.
