= Krakovany (Kolín District) =

- Municipality
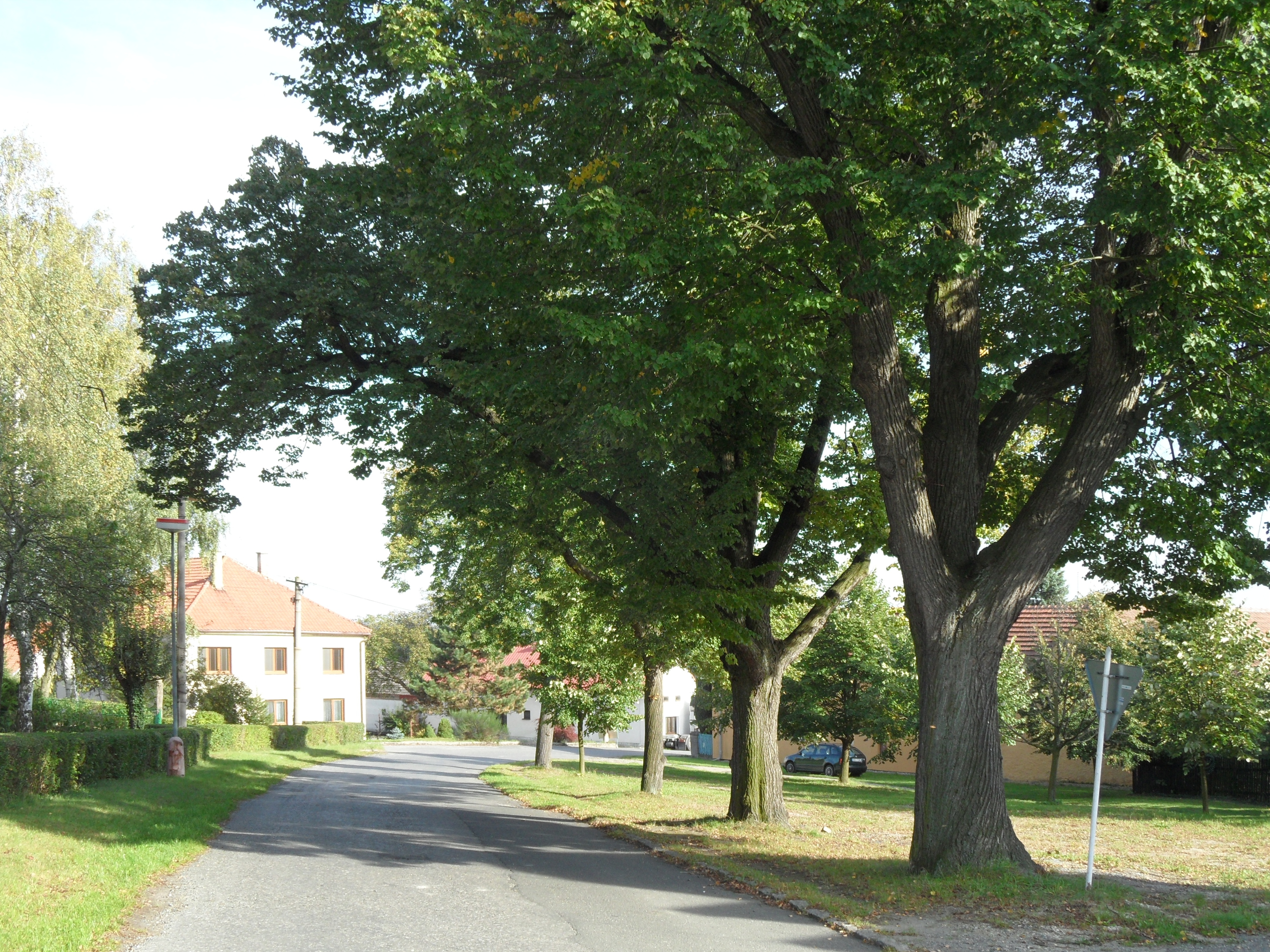
- Centre of Krakovany

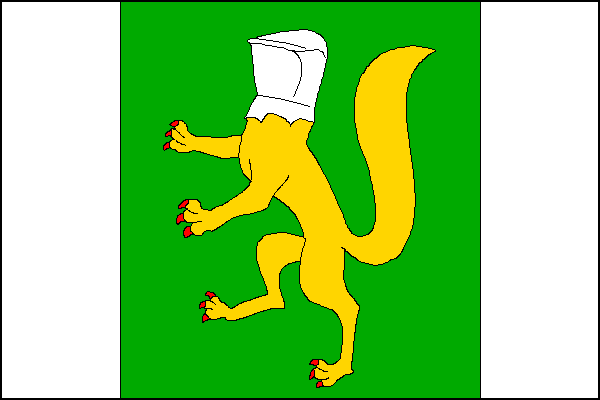
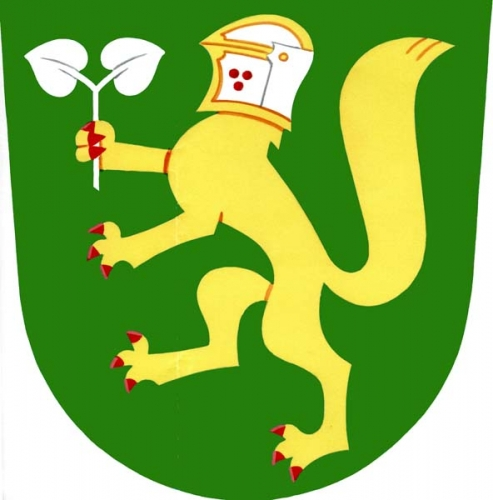
- Flag Coat of arms

- Location in the Czech Republic
- Coordinates: 50°3′58″N 15°22′8″E
- Country: Czech Republic
- Region: Central Bohemian
- District: Kolín
- First mentioned: 1244

Area
  - Total: 10.55 km^{2} (4.07 sq mi)
- Elevation: 226 m (741 ft)

Population (2026-01-01)
  - Total: 946
  - Density: 89.7/km^{2} (232/sq mi)
- Time zone: UTC+1 (CET)
  - Summer (DST): UTC+2 (CEST)
- Postal code: 281 27
- Website: www.obec-krakovany.cz

Krakovany is a municipality and village in Kolín District in the Central Bohemian Region of the Czech Republic. It has about 900 inhabitants.

== Administrative division ==
Krakovany consists of two municipal parts (in brackets population according to the 2021 census):

- Krakovany (772)
- Božec (106)

== Etymology ==
The name Krakovany means "the village of people who came from Krakov".

== Geography ==
Krakovany is located about 13 kilometres (8 mi) east of Kolín and 28 km (17 mi) west of Pardubice. It lies in the East Elbe Table. The highest point is at 250 m (820 ft) above sea level.

== History ==
The first written mention of Krakovany is from 1244. Until 1510, when the village was bought by Vilém II of Pernštejn, Krakovany was owned by various lesser nobles. Božec was first mentioned in 1371. In 1961, the municipalities of Krakovany and Božec were merged.

== Demographics ==
Historical population

Year	Pop.	±%
1869	847	—
1880	960	+13.3%
1890	917	−4.5%
1900	930	+1.4%
1910	1,023	+10.0%

Year	Pop.	±%
1921	1,085	+6.1%
1930	1,048	−3.4%
1950	926	−11.6%
1961	935	+1.0%
1970	839	−10.3%

Year	Pop.	±%
1980	835	−0.5%
1991	801	−4.1%
2001	769	−4.0%
2011	775	+0.8%
2021	878	+13.3%

Source: Censuses

== Transport ==
There are no railways or major roads passing through the municipality.

== Sights ==
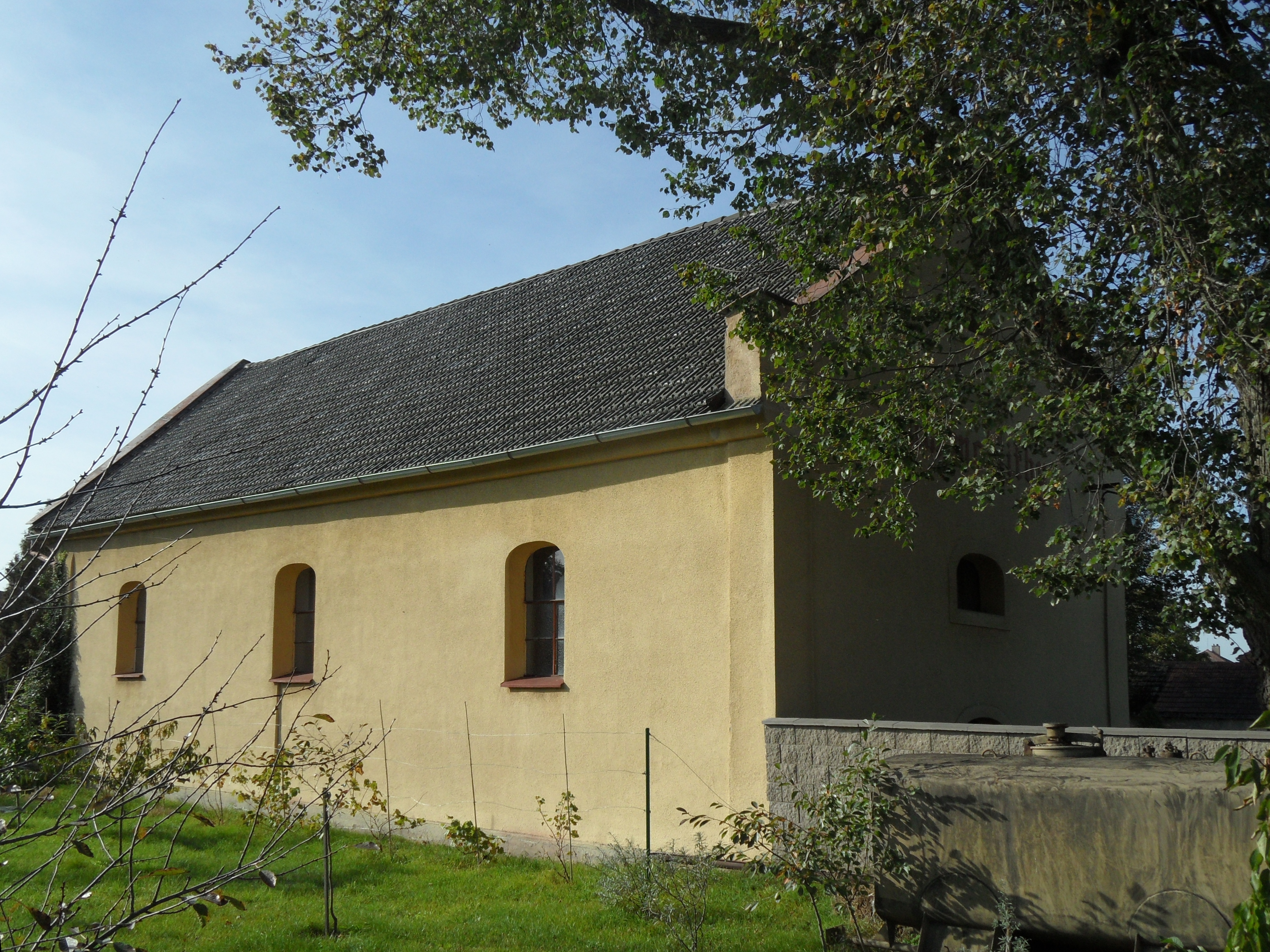
Evangelical prayer house

The most valuable building is the Evangelical prayer house. The original wooden prayer house was built in 1784 as one of the first Evangelical prayer houses built after the Patent of Toleration was issued. The brick prayer house replaced the wooden one in 1804. In 1840, it was rebuilt to its present form.
