= Blumenau (disambiguation) =

Blumenau is a city in Santa Catarina, Brazil.

Blumenau may also refer to:

- Blumenau (Winterthur), a part of Winterthur, Zürich, Switzerland
- Blumenau, a former settlement near Stettler, Alberta, Canada
- Blumenau, a part of Engelskirchen, North Rhine-Westphalia, Germany
- Blumenau, a part of Mannheim, Baden-Württemberg, Germany
- Blumenau, a part of Mellenbach-Glasbach, Thuringia, Germany
- Blumenau, a part of Munich, Bavaria, Germany
- Blumenau, a part of Olbernhau, Saxony, Germany
- Blumenau (Wunstorf), a part of Wunstorf, Lower Saxony, Germany
- Heide-Nord/Blumenau, a part of Halle (Saale), Saxony-Anhalt, Germany

In historical contexts, Blumenau, Groß Blumenau or Klein Blumenau may refer to:

- Czarny Kierz, Warmia-Masuria, Poland
- Kremnyovo, Kaliningrad, Russia
- Kwiatuszki Wielkie and Kwiatuszki Małe, Warmia-Masuria, Poland
- Kwietniki, Lower Silesia, Poland
- Kwietnik, Warmia-Masuria, Poland
- Jedlinka Górna, Lower Silesia, Poland
- Lamač, Bratislava, Slovakia (Location of the Battle of Blumenau)
- Květná, Pardubice, Czechia
- Plumlov, Olomouc, Czechia
- Świniary Wielkie and Świniary Małe, Opole, Poland

== People with the surname ==
- Colin Blumenau (born 1956), British writer and theatre director
- F. W. Blumenau, pseudonym of Friedrich Wilhelm August Bratring (1772–1829), German ethnologist and author
- Hermann Blumenau (1819–1899), German pharmacist and founder of Blumenau, Brazil
- Jack Blumenau (born 1986), British actor
- Laurentius Blumenau (died 1484), German Carthusian monk and humanist
- Martin Blumenau (born 1960), Austrian journalist and moderator
- Salomon Blumenau (1825–1904), German Reform Jewish preacher and religion teacher
