= St. Hyacinth's Church, Wierzbica Górna =

Coordinates: 51.0155°N 17.5852°E

St. Hyacinth's Church
- Kościół św. Jacka w Wierzbicy Górnej
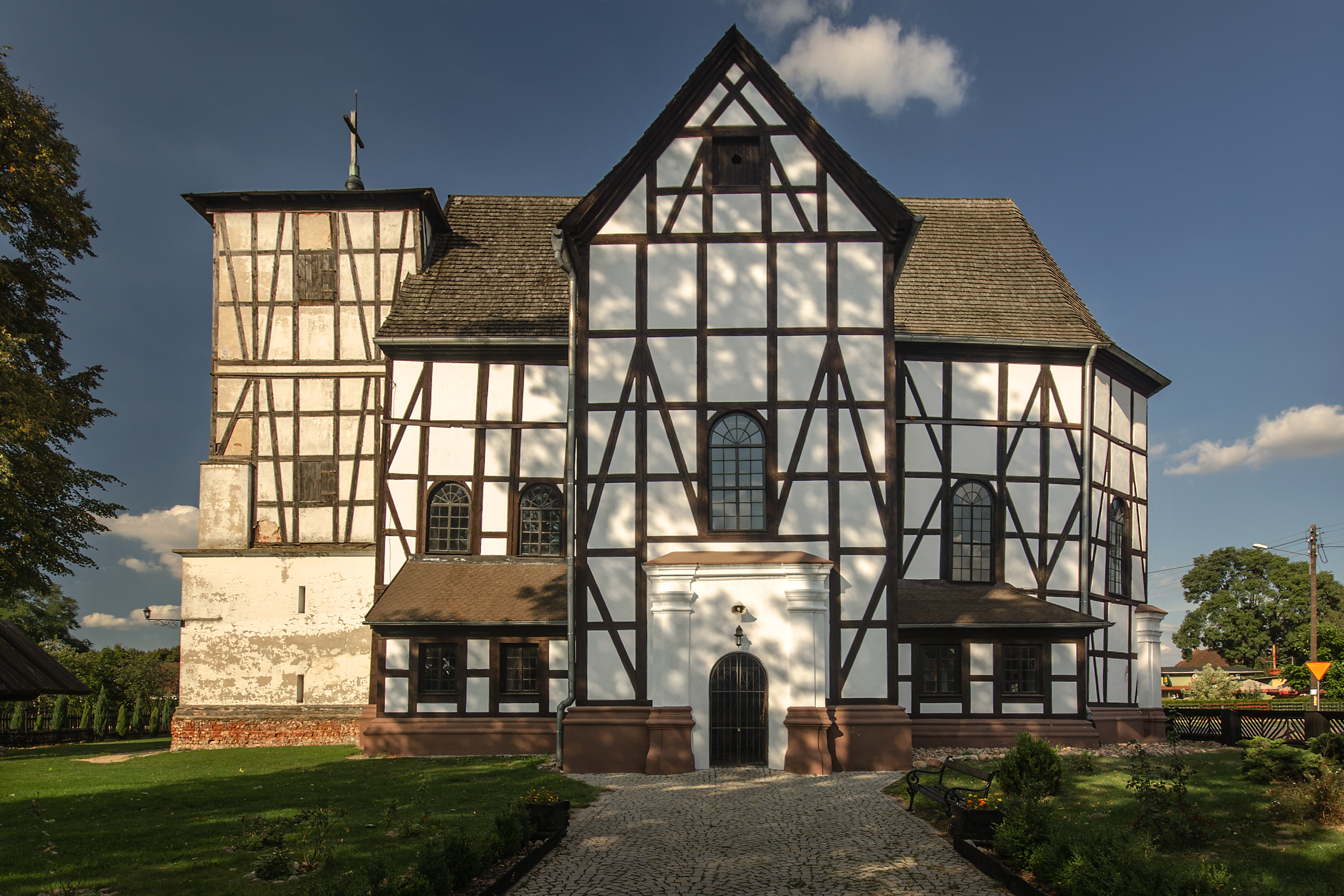
- St. Hyacinth Church
- St. Hyacinth's Church
- Location: Wierzbica Górna
- Country: Poland
- Denomination: Roman Catholic

History
- Founder: Joachim Wenzl von Neffe und Obsichau

Architecture
- Groundbreaking: 1719
- Completed: 1722

Specifications
- Materials: Wood

Administration
- Archdiocese: Roman Catholic Archdiocese of Wrocław
- Parish: Parafia św. Jacka w Wierzbicy Górnej

St. Hyacinth's Church in Wierzbica Górna (Gmina Wołczyn), Poland, is a wooden church built in 1722. The church belongs to St. Hyacinth Parish in Wierzbica Górna, in the Namysłów-South Deanery of the Roman Catholic Archdiocese of Wrocław. Since April 18, 1964 the church was registered on the Register of Objects of Cultural Heritage for the Opole Voivodeship, with the registration number of 818/64.
