= Rożnów, Opole Voivodeship =

Rożnów
- Village
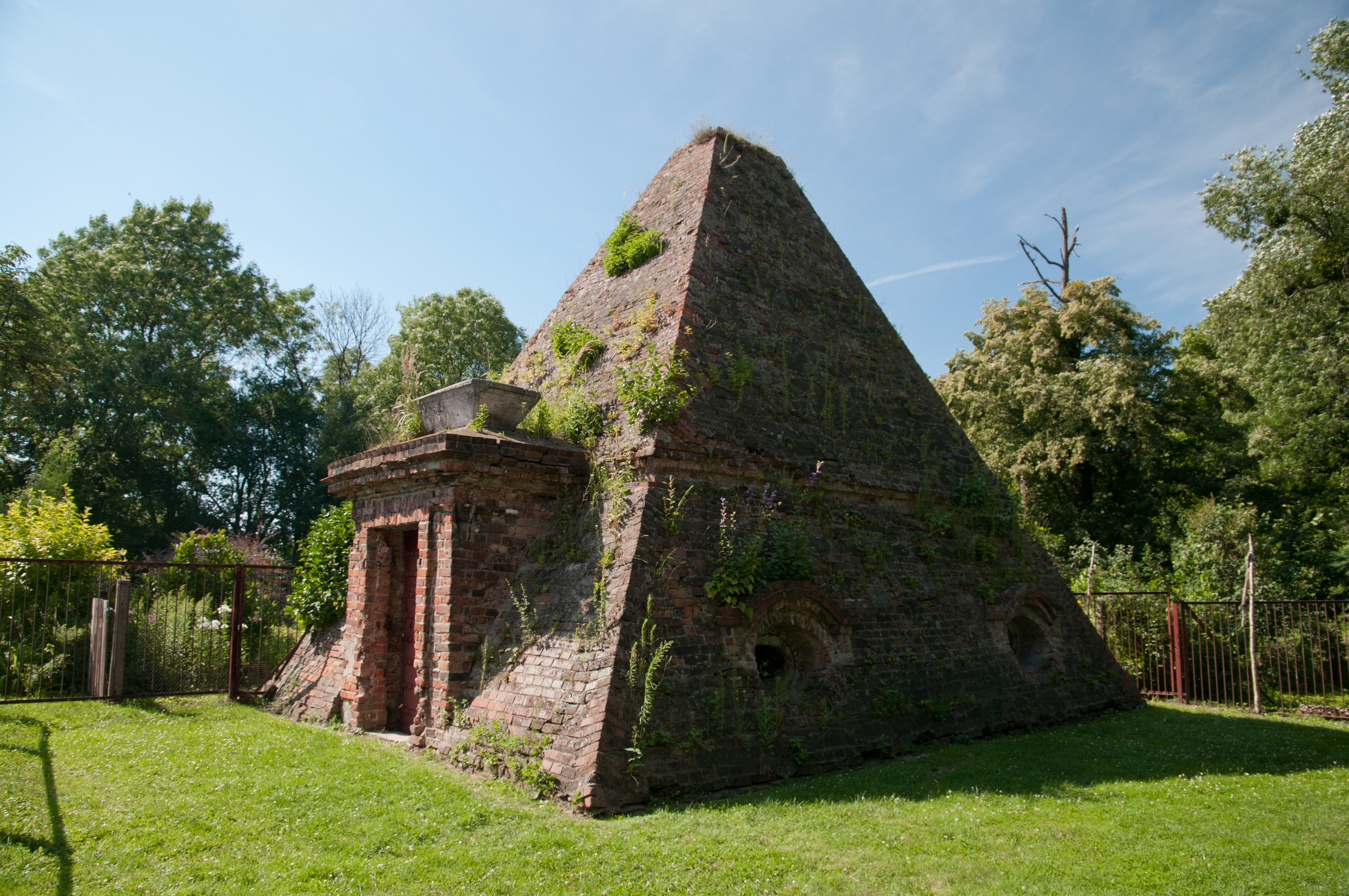

- Location within Poland
- Coordinates: 51°03′22″N 18°08′47″E
- Country: Poland
- Voivodeship: Opole
- County: Kluczbork
- Gmina: Wołczyn

Rożnów [ˈrɔʐnuf] is a village in the administrative district of Gmina Wołczyn, within Kluczbork County, Opole Voivodeship, in south-western Poland.

Rosen belonged to the Kreis Kreuzburg (1742 to 1945), Province of Silesia (1815 to 1919), Kingdom of Prussia, German Empire.

There is a pyramid-shaped tomb here, built in 1780 during the German-Prussian era when the village was called Ober-Rosen. It was designed by Carl Gotthard Langhans (who also designed the Brandenburg Gate) and housed the tombs of Prussian general Karl Adolf August von Eben und Brunnen and his closest relatives.

== Notable people ==
- Reinhold Saltzwedel
