= Reinhold Saltzwedel =

German World War I U-boat commander

- Reinhold Saltzwedel
- Born: 23 November 1889; Rosen, Kreis Kreuzburg, Province of Silesia, Kingdom of Prussia, German Empire
- Died: 2 December 1917 (aged 28); English Channel, off the Isle of Wight, England
- Military career
- Allegiance: German Empire
- Branch: Imperial German Navy
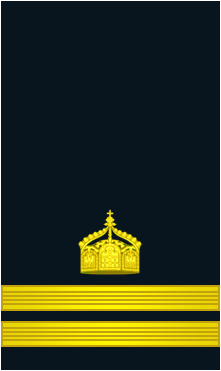
- Rank: Oberleutnant zur See
- Commands: UB-10, 13 January – 18 June 1916; UC-10, 14–26 June 1916; UC-11, 12–20 August 1916; UC-21, 15 September 1916 – 9 June 1917; UC-71, 10 June – 13 September 1917; UB-81, 18 September – 2 December 1917
- Conflicts: U-boat Campaign (World War I)
- Awards: Iron Cross; Pour le Mérite; Knight's Cross of the Royal House Order of Hohenzollern

Reinhold Karl Albert Johannes Saltzwedel (23 November 1889 – 2 December 1917) was a successful and highly decorated German U-boat commander in the Kaiserliche Marine during World War I. He sank a total of 111 merchant vessels for 172,824 gross register tons (GRT). On 1 September 1936, his name was given to the 2nd U-boat Flotilla of the Kriegsmarine in Wilhelmshaven to honour him.

== Life ==
=== Early life ===
Reinhold Saltzwedel was born on 23 November 1889 in Rosen, Upper Silesia. His parents were pastor D. theol. Johannes Saltzwedel and his wife Marie, née Piper. In 1896, the family relocated to Stettin where the parents originally came from. Here, Reinhold attended school and achieved his Abitur in March 1908.

=== World War I ===
Saltzwedel was a Leutnant zur See when World War I broke out, and adjutant on the SMS Kaiser. On 19 September 1914, he was promoted to Oberleutnant zur See. In May 1915, he went to the U-boat school. Shortly afterwards, he served as commander of several U-boats.

On 29 March 1917, he was awarded the Knight's Cross of the Royal House Order of Hohenzollern with Swords, and on 20 August 1917, he was awarded the Pour le Mérite for his achievements.

On 18 September 1917, he became the commanding officer of UB-81, aboard which he died on 2 December after SM UB-81 ran into a mine. Twenty-nine men lost their lives.

==== Ace of the seas ====
Saltzwedel sank during his 22 patrols 111 ships with a total of 172,824 GRT and damaged another 10 ships with a total of 17,131 GRT (together 189,955 GRT). He damaged the French Q-ship "Normandy" and sank the British Q-ship HMS "Dunraven".
