= Landkreis Kreuzburg O.S. =

Former administrative division

- District of Prussia
- 1742–1945
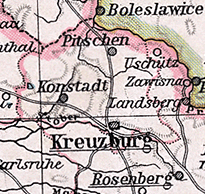
- Map from 1905
- Capital: Kreuzburg O.S. (Kluczbork)
- History
  - Established: 1742
  - Disestablished: 1945
- Today part of: Poland

Landkreis Kreuzburg O.S. was a Prussian district in Silesia, from 1742 to 1945, with its capital at Kreuzburg O.S. (Kluczbork). Today, the region is part of the Polish Opole Voivodeship.

== History ==
In the course of the Stein-Hardenberg Reforms, the district of Kreuzburg in the Province of Silesia was initially assigned to Regierungsbezirk Breslau, but then on May 1, 1820, it was reclassified to Regierungsbezirk Oppeln. Since then, the district has been considered part of Upper Silesia. The district capital was changed to Konstadt (Wołczyn), but was moved back to Kreuzburg on January 1, 1880. The spelling of the name of the city and the district fluctuated between Creutzburg, Creuzburg and Kreuzburg. The city and district name was officially set to Kreuzburg in Oberschlesien on September 23, 1881. Later, the abbreviation Kreuzburg OS was adopted.

On November 8, 1919, the Province of Silesia was divided into the Province of Lower Silesia (Regierungsbezirke Liegnitz and Breslau) and the Province of Upper Silesia (Regierungsbezirk Oppeln). The persecution of Poles intensified since 1937, and the local leader of the Union of Poles in Germany Paweł Widera was arrested in May 1939. On April 1, 1938, the Prussian provinces of Lower Silesia and Upper Silesia were merged to form the new Province of Silesia. On January 18, 1941, the province of Silesia was dissolved again and the Kreuzburg district became part of the newly formed Province of Upper Silesia. During World War II, it was the location of the Oflag VIII-A and Stalag Luft 7 prisoner-of-war camps for Polish, British, French, Canadian, Australian, New Zealander, South African, Dutch and other Allied POWs, and the Ilag VIII/Z camp for interned citizens of the United Kingdom and the United States. The Red Army captured the district at the end of January 1945 and it was placed under Polish administration in March.

== Demographics ==
The district had a mixed population of Germans and Poles. According to religion, the majority of the district population was Protestant, along with sizable minorities of Catholics and Jews. The indigenous Polish population was subjected to Germanisation policies.

Population of Kreuzburg O.S district
	1905		1910	
German	20,641	41.4%	24,363	46.9%
Polish / Bilingual / Other	29,269	58.6%	27,543	53.1%
Total	49,910		51,906	

== Place Names ==
In 1935/36, several parishes were renamed in the Kreuzburg OS district:

- Alt Tschapel → Stobertal
- Borek → Waldungen
- Bresinke → Birkdorf
- Brinitze → Kiefernhain
- Deutsch Würbitz → Niederweiden OS
- Frei Tschapel → Freivorwerk
- Golkowitz → Alteichen
- Jaschkowitz → Auenfelde
- Lowkowitz → Bienendorf
- Polanowitz → Kornfelde
- Polnisch Würbitz → Würbitz → Oberweiden OS
- Proschlitz → Angersdorf
- Roschkowitz → Röstfelde
- Schiroslawitz → Grenzfelde
- Woislawitz → Kirchlinden
