= Szklarnia Szymonkowska =

- Village
- Location within Poland
- Coordinates: 51°6′12″N 17°59′48″E
- Country: Poland
- Voivodeship: Opole
- County: Kluczbork
- Gmina: Wołczyn

Szklarnia Szymonkowska (Polish pronunciation: [ˈʂklarɲa ʂɨmɔnˈkɔfska]) is a village in the administrative district of Gmina Wołczyn, within Kluczbork County, Opole Voivodeship, in south-western Poland.
