= Wierzchy, Opole Voivodeship =

Wierzchy
- Village
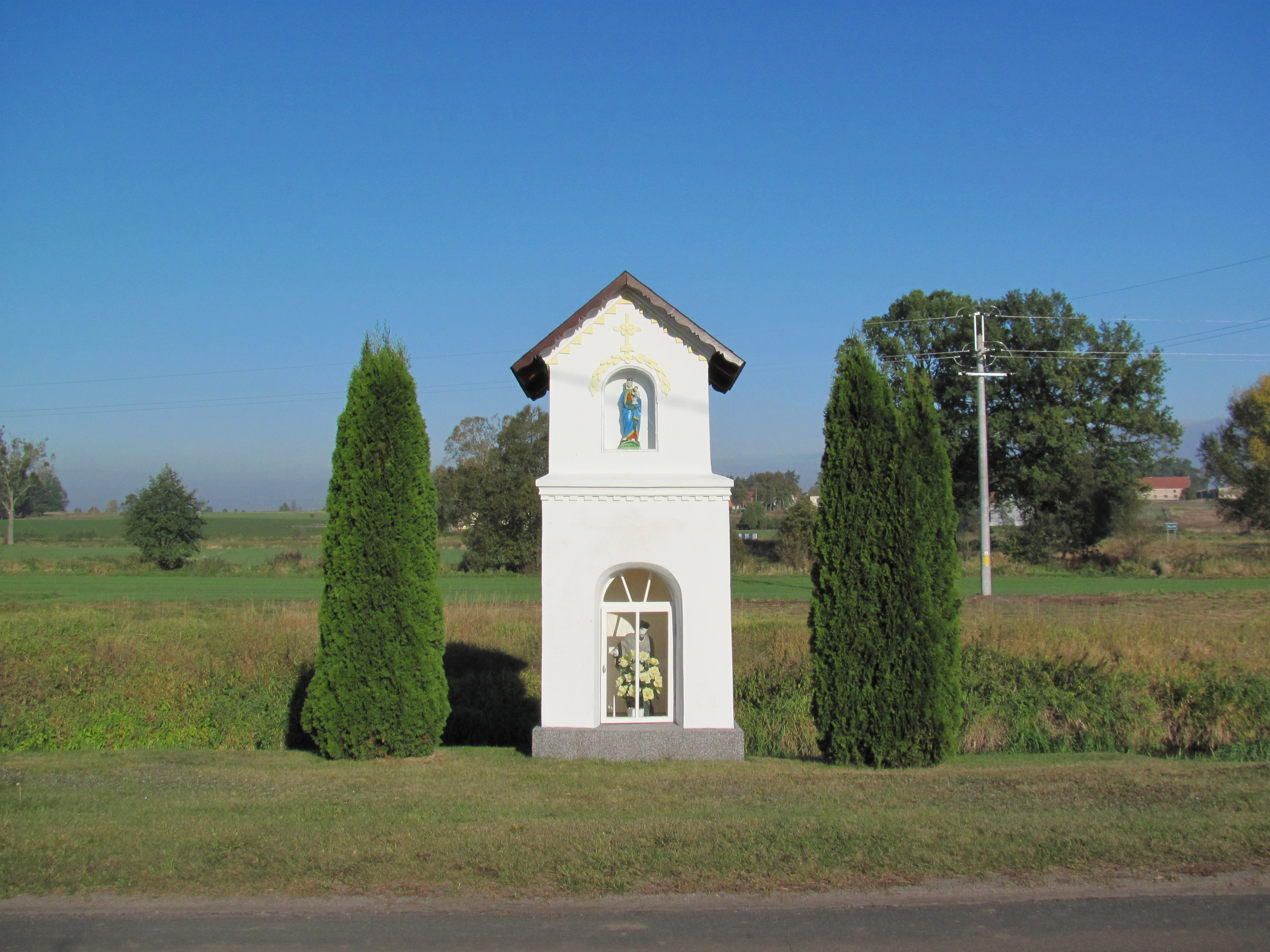

- Location within Poland
- Coordinates: 50°58′11″N 18°03′16″E
- Country: Poland
- Voivodeship: Opole
- County: Kluczbork
- Gmina: Wołczyn

Wierzchy [ˈvjɛʂxɨ] is a village in the administrative district of Gmina Wołczyn, within Kluczbork County, Opole Voivodeship, in south-western Poland.
