= Protection of Military Remains Act 1986 =

Act of the Parliament of the United Kingdom

Protection of Military Remains Act 1986 (Note: Section 10(1).)
- Act of Parliament
- Parliament of the United Kingdom
- Long title: An Act to secure the protection from unauthorised interference of the remains of military aircraft and vessels that have crashed, sunk or been stranded and of associated human remains; and for connected purposes.
- Citation: 1986 c.35
- Introduced by: Michael Mates (Commons)
- Territorial extent: United Kingdom (Note: Section 10(3).)

Dates
- Royal assent: 8 July 1986
- Commencement: 8 September 1986 (Note: Section 10(2).)

Other legislation
- Amends: Powers of Criminal Courts Act 1973; Criminal Justice (Northern Ireland) Order 1980
- Amended by: Criminal Justice (Northern Ireland) Order 1994; Merchant Shipping Act 1995; Companies Act 2006 (Consequential Amendments, Transitional Provisions and Savings) Order 2009; Sentencing (Pre-consolidation Amendments) Act 2020; Historic Environment (Wales) Act 2023

Status: Amended

Text of statute as originally enacted

Revised text of statute as amended

Text of the Protection of Military Remains Act 1986 as in force today (including any amendments) within the United Kingdom, from legislation.gov.uk.

The Protection of Military Remains Act 1986 (c. 35) is an act of the Parliament of the United Kingdom that provides protection for the wreckage of military aircraft and designated military vessels. The act provides for two types of protection: protected places and controlled sites. Military aircraft are automatically protected, but vessels have to be specifically designated. The primary reason for designation is to protect as a 'war grave' the last resting place of British servicemen (or other nationals); however, the act does not require the loss of the vessel to have occurred during war.

There have been eight statutory instruments designating wrecks under the act, in 2002 (amended 2003), 2006, 2008, 2009, 2012, 2017, 2019, and 2026) Sixteen wrecks are designated as controlled sites, on which diving is banned. These vessels (including one German submarine), all lost on military service, provide a small representative sample of all such vessels. All other vessels that meet the criteria of the act are subject to a rolling programme of assessment and those that meet the criteria will be designated as protected places. The order that is currently in force, since March 2026, designates 113 wrecks as protected places. This means that diving is allowed, but divers must follow the rule of look, don't touch.

== Protection under the act ==
The act provides for two types of protection: protected places and controlled sites. The primary reason for designation is to protect the last resting place of British servicemen (or other nationals). While this is often referred to as protection as a war grave, the protected wrecks are not graves in the sense of falling under the control of the Commonwealth War Graves Commission, nor are they required to have been lost during wartime.

The wreckage of all military aircraft (British or other nations') that crashed in the United Kingdom, in United Kingdom territorial waters or in United Kingdom-controlled waters is automatically protected irrespective of whether there was loss of life or whether the wrecking occurred during peacetime or in a combat. The wreckage of United Kingdom military aircraft is also protected under the act elsewhere in the world.

=== Protected places ===
Wrecks are designated by name and can be designated as protected places even if the location of the site is not known. Thus, the wreckage of a British military aircraft is automatically a protected place even if the physical remains have not been previously discovered or identified. Shipwrecks need to be specifically designated, and designation as a protected place applies only to vessels that sank after 4 August 1914 (the date of the United Kingdom's entry into the First World War). The act makes it an offence to interfere with a protected place, to disturb the site or to remove anything from the site. Divers may visit the site, but the rule is look, don't touch and don't penetrate. The law concerning protected places applies anywhere in the world, but, outside of the UK, the sanctions can only be enforced, in practice, against British citizens, British-flagged ships or vessels landing in the UK, unless backed by local legislation. The first and only licence granted in respect of a vessel designated a protected place was granted to Mike Williams of the Nautical Archaeology Society for a project to commemorate the 75th anniversary of the loss of the M2 submarine, including the placing of a white ensign underwater.

=== Controlled sites ===
Controlled sites must be specifically designated by location, where the site contains the remains of an aircraft or a vessel that crashed, sank or was stranded within the last two hundred years. The act makes it illegal to conduct any operations (including any diving or excavation) within the controlled site that might disturb the remains unless licensed to do so by the Ministry of Defence. Licences have been granted for excavation of aircraft, provided that it is not thought that there are human remains present or unexploded ordnance. In the case of sunken vessels, any activities necessary, such as the recovery of extant human remains and the sealing of openings into wrecks, is generally carried out by Ministry of Defence diving teams. Controlled sites at sea are marked on admiralty charts, and their physical location is marked by means of a buoy (sea mark).

== Protection of aircraft ==
During the 1970s, there was a rapid growth in excavation of the crash sites of military aircraft. These were sometimes carried out by interested amateur souvenir hunters, and sometimes by more serious prospectors of valuable military artefacts. The rights and wrongs of this activity was confused by conflicting statements from the Ministry of Defence, who, in 1973 stated that they had abandoned all claim to crashed planes and that any of official interest had been recovered. Later on they reversed this position, claiming Crown title of both RAF and German wrecks and stating that any excavation required official permission, issuing guidelines and threatening that excavation without such permission was illegal interference with Crown property. Excavations continued, however, and several incidents involving the discovery of human remains and live ordnance (along with concerns about divers and shipwrecks) led to the passing of the Protection of Military Remains Act 1986.

Since the passing of the Act, investigators have been able to obtain licences to excavate subject to a number of conditions. The applicant must have thoroughly researched the crash and be able to identify the aircraft and the fate of the crew. This research becomes the property of the Ministry of Defence. The landowner of the site of the crash must have given permission. Special conditions may be imposed by local councils or heritage agencies. Following excavation, all material recovered must be identified to the Ministry of Defence. Personal property of the aircrew is likely to be returned to next of kin, and military artefacts of historical interest are likely to be placed in the care of the Royal Air Force Museum, but the licensee may apply for ownership of other material. Licences cannot be issued for sites where there is likely to be unexploded ordnance, and Ministry of Defence policy is not to issue licences where human remains are likely to be found. The Ministry of Defence reserves the right to witness all excavations.

A large number of aircraft were lost in the sea off the south and east coasts of England during the Second World War. These areas are commercially important for marine aggregates. Since the aircraft are protected under this Act, the discovery of aircraft remains during aggregate dredging means that dredging must stop and an exclusion zone around the position of the wreck established. The disturbance of wrecks by dredging is also of concern for potential disturbance of human remains and because of damage to an important historical resource. A project undertaken in 2007–2008 by Wessex Archaeology, funded under the Aggregates Levy Sustainability Fund managed by English Heritage, looked at the potential of the historical resource of such wrecks and also for issuing guidance to the aggregates industry to manage the impact of finding remains.

== Criteria for designation of wrecks ==
As a result of an extensive consultation carried out in 2000–2001, the Ministry of Defence announced that it would carry out a rolling programme of assessment of all British military wrecks known to have been lost on military service. Designation as a controlled site is only applicable in waters controlled by the United Kingdom. Wrecks considered dangerous will be designated as controlled sites. Wrecks that met a set of criteria would be designated. Under the act, wrecks to be designated as controlled sites must have sunk within the last two hundred years. Wrecks to be designated as protected places must have been lost after 4 August 1914. The criteria for designation announced by the Ministry of Defence include: whether the wreck represents the last resting place of servicemen; whether the wreck has suffered sustained disturbance and looting, and whether designation is likely to stop such disturbance; whether diving on the wreck attracts public criticism; and whether the wreck is of historical significance. In addition, it was announced that, if a wreck designated as a protected place suffers sustained disturbance, it will be designated as a controlled site.

== History of designations under the act ==
The act was passed in 1986, partly in response to concerns over excavation of military aircraft, partly over public disquiet about the fate of sunken military ships and also because, in the aftermath of the Falklands War, public opinion supported the idea that a maritime war grave should be sacrosanct. The ships of concern included HMS Hampshire, where it is alleged that personal possessions of casualties had been looted by divers and where the British Government gave rights for the salvage of HMS Edinburgh, which had occurred without respecting the human remains that it contained. However, although the act gave immediate protection to wrecked aircraft, the wrecks of ships needed to be individually designated to be protected.

=== First designations ===
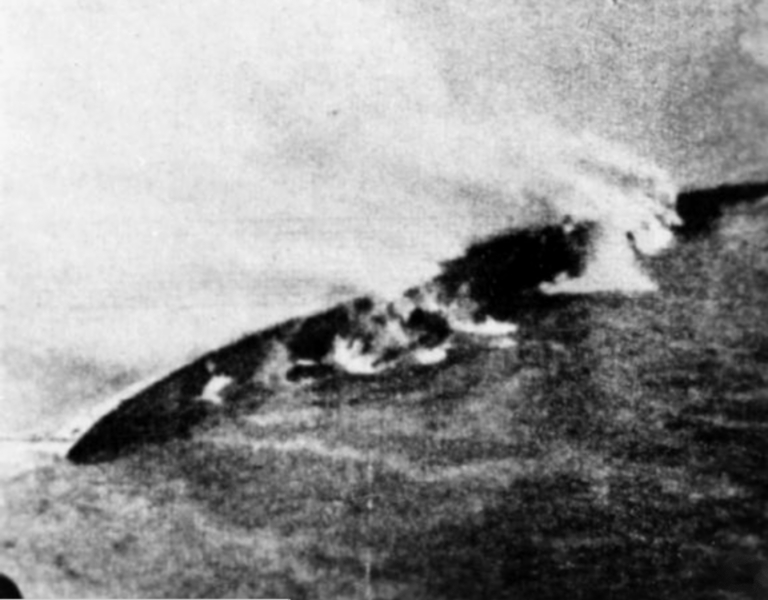
HMS Gloucester sinking off Crete on 22 May 1941, one of the first vessels to be protected in 2002

By the year 2000, there was widespread concern amongst survivor associations (such as those of Force Z), and amongst the majority of divers, about the behaviour of a minority of scuba divers who were disturbing wrecks that most thought should be treated with respect. In 2000, the diving associations, BSAC, PADI and SAA, with the support of the Maritime and Coastguard Agency, Ministry of Defence, Nautical Archaeology Society, and Joint Nautical Archaeology Policy Committee, launched a code of conduct for divers entitled "Respect our Wrecks", with the central message of look, don't touch. It was not until 2002 that the first designations came into force. The announcement stated that there would be sixteen controlled sites (in waters under British control), and five designated protected places (five British wrecks in international waters and one German U-boat in British waters), with four of the Falkland wrecks HMS Ardent, HMS Antelope, HMS Coventry and HMS Sheffield listed as controlled sites. The order only covered eleven controlled sites, which did not include the Falkland wrecks. HMS Prince of Wales and HMS Repulse (the ships of Force Z) as well as HMS Hampshire were included in the designations. However, HMS Ardent and HMS Antelope were already protected (as prohibited sites because they were considered dangerous) by an order passed in 1983 under the Falkland Islands Protection of Wrecks Ordinance 1977. HMS Coventry and HMS Sheffield had to wait until 2006 to be protected.

The coordinates given for the position of HMS Hampshire had to be corrected in a subsequent order in 2003.

=== Second tranche including Battle of Jutland wrecks ===
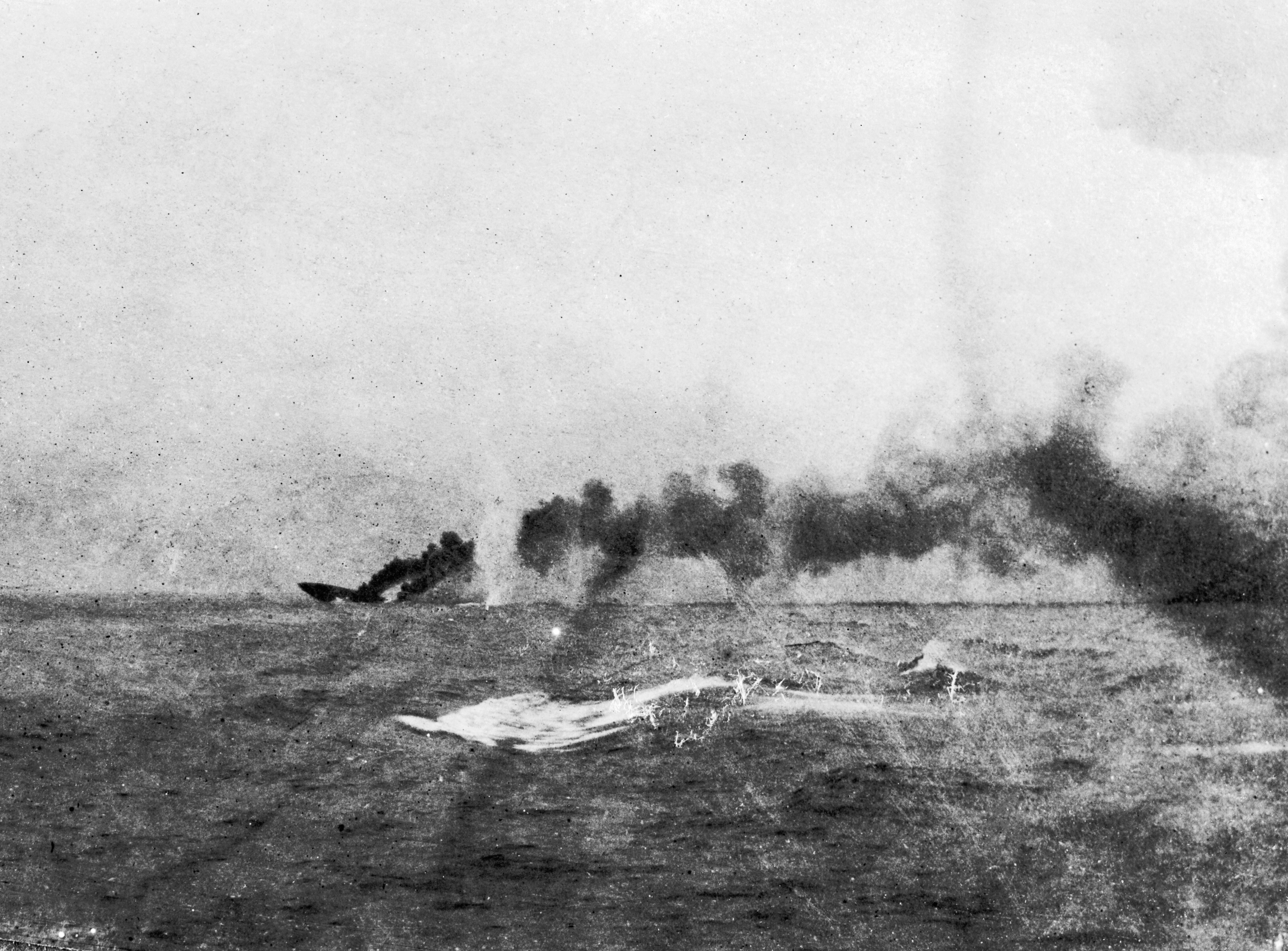
HMS Indefatigable, one of the wrecks from the Battle of Jutland protected in the second tranche in 2006

On 31 May 2006, the 90th anniversary of the Battle of Jutland, it was announced that the remains of the fourteen British ships lost in that battle were being designated as protected places. The 'second tranche' came into force on 1 November 2006. This revoked the first tranche, but re-designated the wrecks and added a further 29 protected places and 1 controlled site (the SM UB-81). HMS Sheffield was one of the protected places added. At around the same time, the Falkland Islands issued an order under the Falkland Islands Protection of Wrecks Ordnance 1977 designating HMS Coventry as a restricted area.

=== The Storaa judgment and third tranche ===
The SS Storaa was a merchant vessel sunk by a German torpedo on 3 November 1943 while she was part of a military convoy. Those who died included Royal Navy personnel, as well as merchant seamen.

Rosemary Fogg and Valerie Ledgard (the claimants), the daughters of one of the men who died, Petty Officer James Varndell RN, requested that the Ministry of Defence designate the wreck. When the Ministry of Defence refused on the grounds that this was a merchant ship and therefore not eligible for designation, the claimants made an application for judicial review, supported by Peter Marsden (a local historian and maritime archaeologist) and the Merchant Navy Association. The High Court judge, Mr Justice Newmann, decided in favour of the claimants on 13 December 2005. The Ministry of Defence appealed, but on 5 October 2006, the Appeal Court upheld the High Court decision. The court ruled that the act could apply to merchant vessels and that the Secretary of State for Defence was therefore required to reconsider whether or not the Storaa should be designated under the act. Note that the judgement did not guarantee that the wreck would be designated, only that it was eligible for consideration. However, the wreck was subsequently designated in 2008.

The third tranche came into force on 1 May 2008, revoking the 2006 order, but re-designating the wrecks and adding 10 more vessels designated as protected places. These included the first merchant ships to be protected, SS Storaa and Atlantic Conveyor, which had been requisitioned to serve as a transport ship in the Falklands War.

== See also ==
- Aviation archaeology
- Maritime archaeology
- Archaeology of shipwrecks
- Wreck diving
- List of shipwrecks
- Protection of Wrecks Act 1973
- Battle of Jutland
