= Szymonków =

- Village
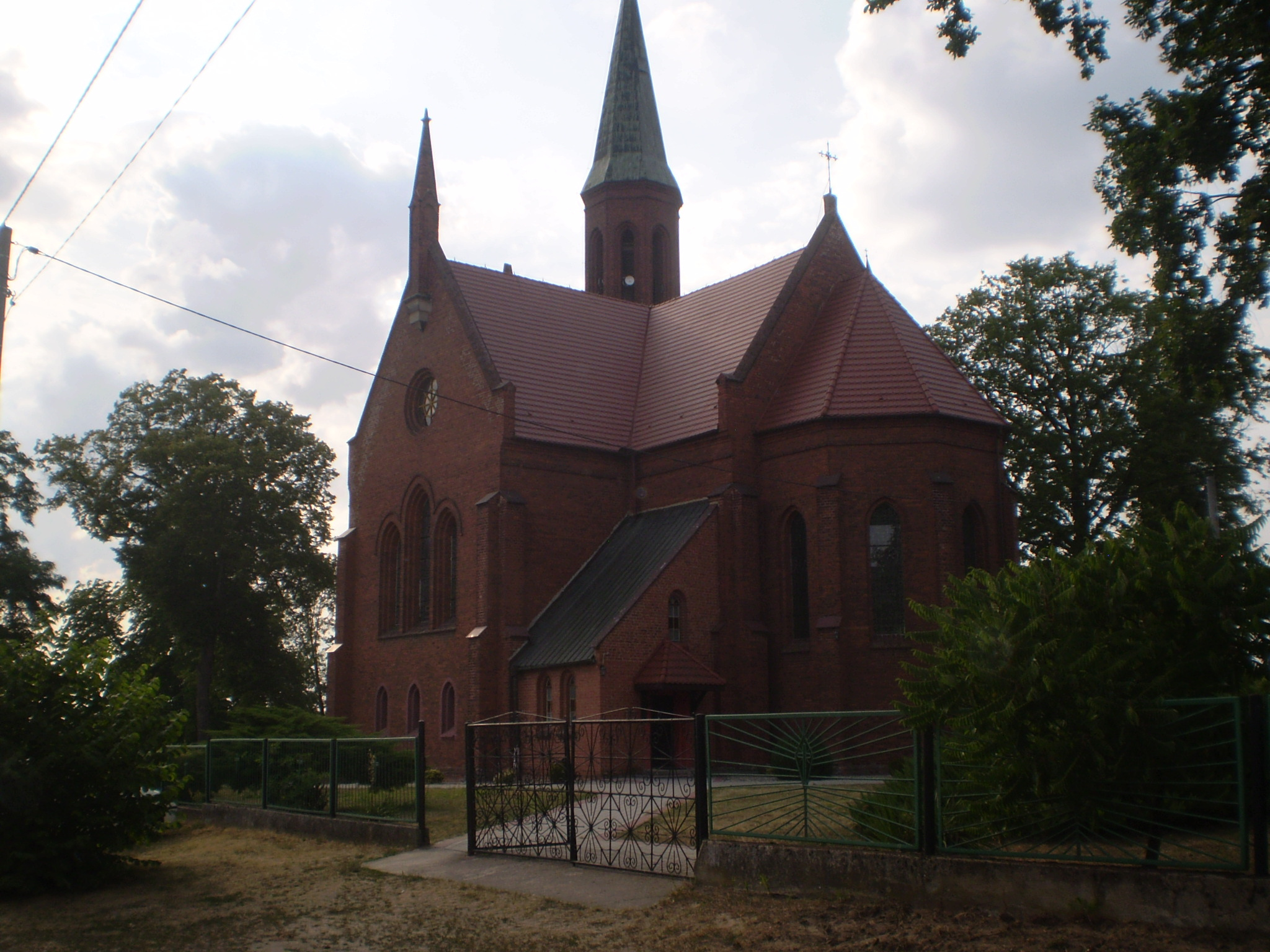
- Church of the Nativity of the Virgin Mary in Szymonków

- Location within Poland
- Coordinates: 51°5′40″N 17°58′52″E
- Country: Poland
- Voivodeship: Opole
- County: Kluczbork
- Gmina: Wołczyn

Szymonków (Polish: [ʂɨˈmɔnkuf]) is a village in the administrative district of Gmina Wołczyn, within Kluczbork County, Opole Voivodeship, in south-western Poland.
