= Ludwig Wieden =

Austrian painter

- Born: 10 November 1869; Květná, Austria-Hungary
- Died: 20 August 1947 (aged 77); Gmunden, Austria
- Occupation: Painter

Ludwig Wieden (10 November 1869 – 20 August 1947) was an Austrian painter. His work was part of the painting event in the art competition at the 1928 Summer Olympics.
