= Bruny, Poland =

Bruny
- Village
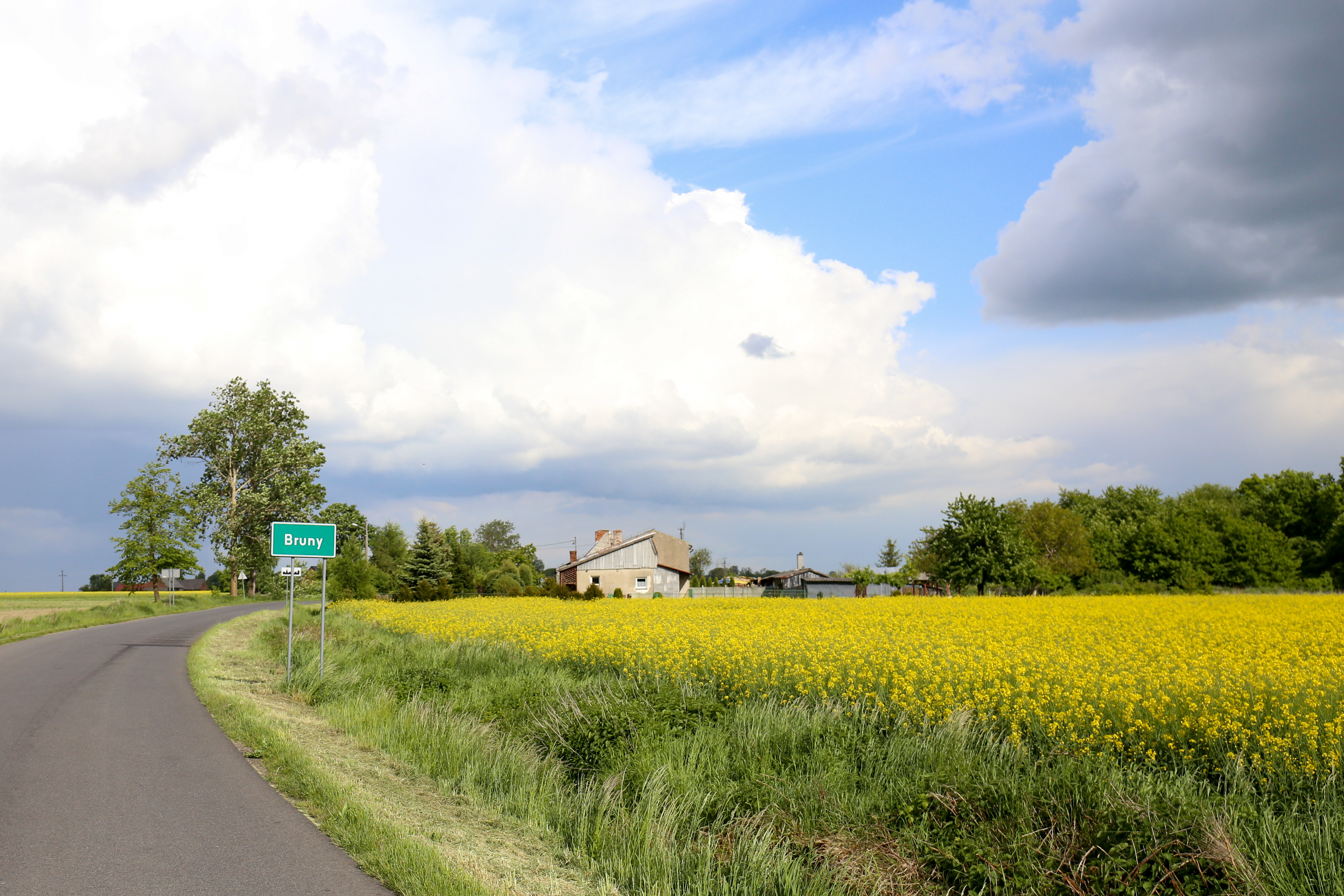

- Location within Poland
- Coordinates: 51°5′14″N 18°4′22″E
- Country: Poland
- Voivodeship: Opole
- County: Kluczbork
- Gmina: Wołczyn

Bruny [ˈbrunɨ] is a village in the administrative district of Gmina Wołczyn, within Kluczbork County, Opole Voivodeship, in south-western Poland.
