= Duczów Mały =

- Village
- Location within Poland
- Coordinates: 51°02′02″N 17°56′06″E
- Country: Poland
- Voivodeship: Opole
- County: Kluczbork
- Gmina: Wołczyn

Duczów Mały [ˈdut͡ʂuf ˈmawɨ] is a village in the administrative district of Gmina Wołczyn, within Kluczbork County, Opole Voivodeship, in south-western Poland.
