= Wąsice =

- Village
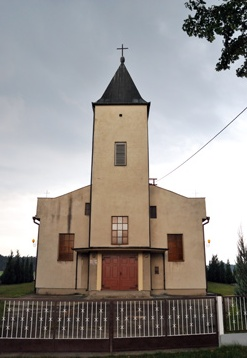
- Catholic church

- Location within Poland
- Coordinates: 50°59′8″N 18°1′4″E
- Country: Poland
- Voivodeship: Opole
- County: Kluczbork
- Gmina: Wołczyn
- Population: 550

Wąsice [vɔ̃ˈɕit͡sɛ] is a village in the administrative district of Gmina Wołczyn, within Kluczbork County, Opole Voivodeship, in south-western Poland.
