= Gierałcice, Kluczbork County =

Gierałcice
- Village
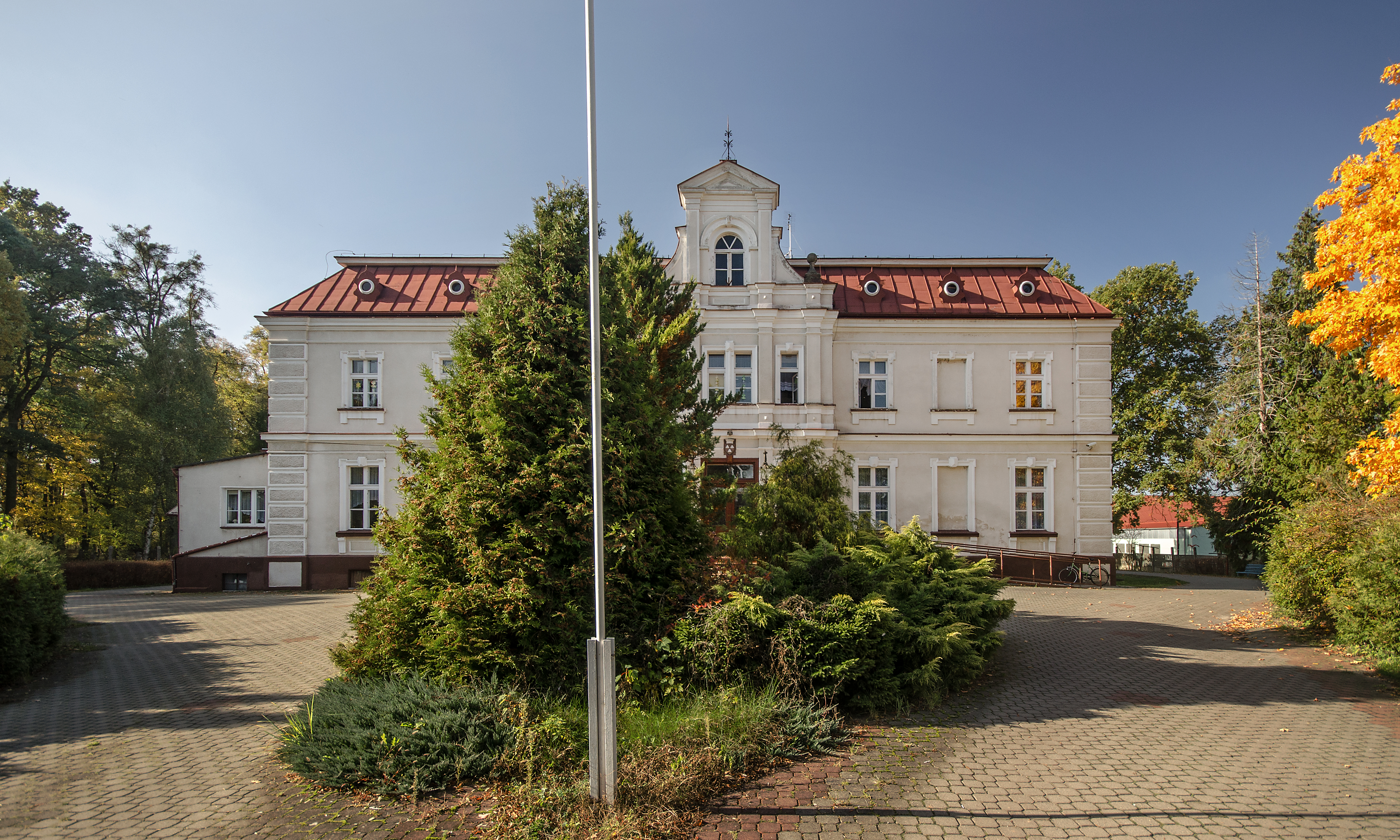
- Gierałcice Palace

- Location within Poland
- Coordinates: 50°59′N 18°3′E
- Country: Poland
- Voivodeship: Opole
- County: Kluczbork
- Gmina: Wołczyn
- Time zone: UTC+1 (CET)
  - Summer (DST): UTC+2 (CEST)
- Area code: 77
- Vehicle registration: OKL

Gierałcice [ɡʲɛrau̯ˈt͡ɕit͡sɛ] is a village in the administrative district of Gmina Wołczyn, within Kluczbork County, Opole Voivodeship, in south-western Poland.

20 Polish citizens were murdered by Nazi Germany in the village during World War II.

== See also ==
- St. Michael's Church, Gierałcice
