= SS Storaa =

Cargo ship built in 1918

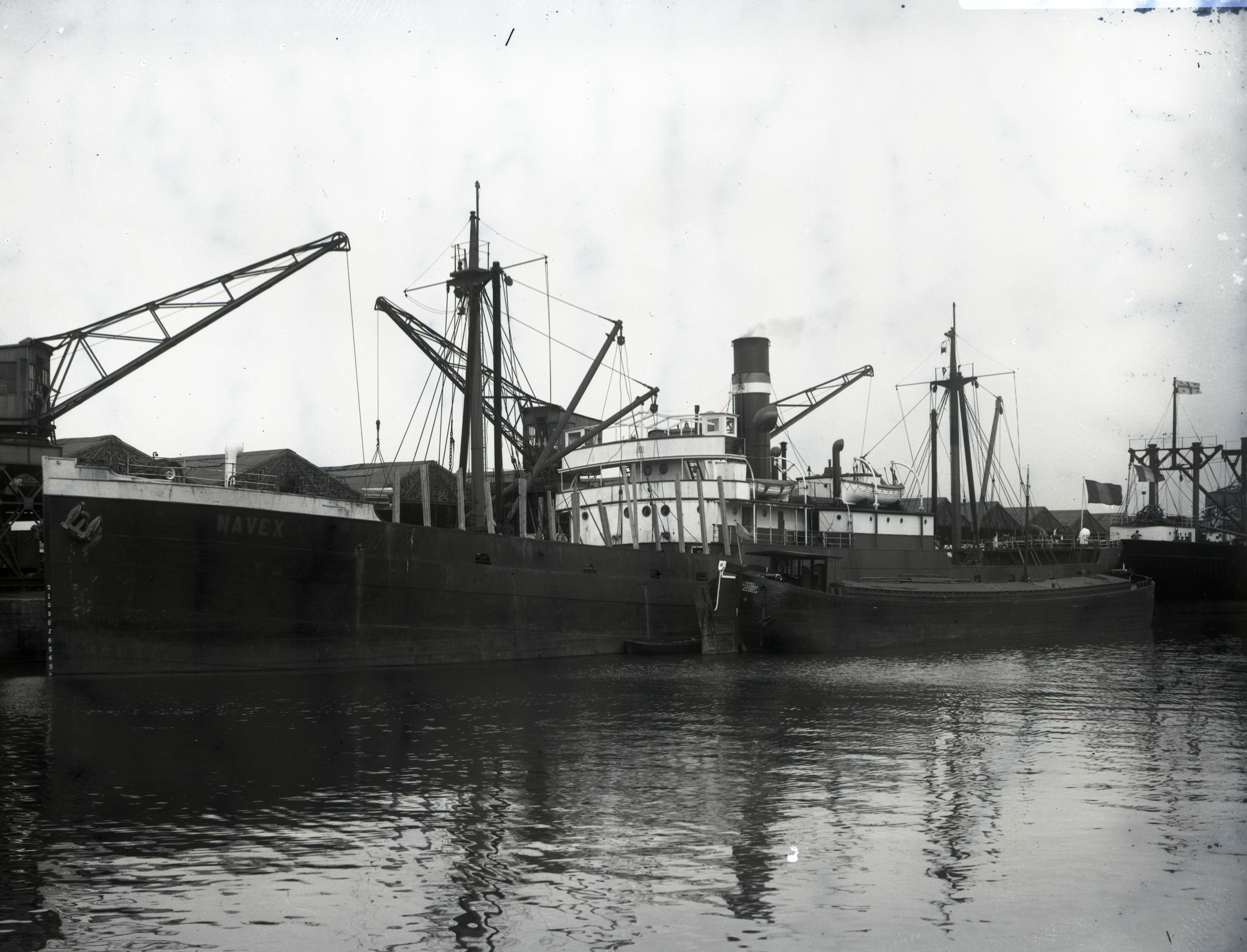
- As Navex in Antwerp

History
- Name: Wellpark (1918–28); Navex (1928–37); Prina (1937–38); Willy (1938–39); Storaa (1939–40); Saint Edmond (1940–43); Storaa (1943)
- Owner: Denholm Line Steamers Ltd (1918–28); SA Navex Société d'Expedition et de Navigation (1928–37); SA Société Belge d'Entreprises Commerciales (1937–38); NV Europeësche Vrachtvaart Maatschappij (1938–39); Dampskibs Hetland AS (1939–40); Ministry of Shipping (1940); Vichy Government (1940–43); Ministry of War Transport (1943)
- Operator: J & J Denholm Ltd (1918–28); SA Navex Société d'Expedition et de Navigation (1928–37); NV Nederlandsch Bevrachtingskantoor (1937–39); T Basse (1939–40); W T Gould (1940); Vichy Government (1940–43); W T Gould (1943)
- Port of registry: (United Kingdom of Great Britain and Ireland) Greenock (1918–23); (United Kingdom) Greenock (1923–28); (Belgium) Antwerp (1928–38); (Netherlands) Amsterdam (1939–39); (Denmark) Copenhagen (1939–40); (United Kingdom) London (1940); Vichy France (1940–43); (United Kingdom) (1943)
- Builder: Greenock & Grangemouth Dockyard Co Ltd
- Yard number: 371
- Launched: 30 October 1917
- Completed: April 1918
- Out of service: 1942–1943
- Identification: Code Letters MNRA (1928-34); Code Letters OOXA (1934-37); Code Letters ONKD (1937–38); Code Letters PIQI (1939–39); Code Letters OZDP (1939–40); Code Letters GLDG (1940); United Kingdom Official Number 142256 (1918–28, 1940, 1943)
- Fate: Torpedoed and sunk

General characteristics
- Type: Cargo ship
- Tonnage: 1,980 GRT; 1,197 NRT
- Length: 280 ft 0 in (85.34 m)
- Beam: 41 ft 9 in (12.73 m)
- Draught: 18 ft 1 in (5.51 m)
- Depth: 18 ft 9 in (5.72 m)
- Propulsion: Triple expansion steam engine

Storaa was a 1,980 GRT cargo ship which was built in 1918 by the Greenock & Grangemouth Dockyard Company as Wellpark for British owners. In 1927, she was sold to Belgium and was renamed Navex. A further sale in 1937 saw her renamed Prina. In 1938, she was sold to the Netherlands and was renamed Willy. In 1939, she was sold to Denmark and was renamed Storaa.

She was detained at Casablanca, Morocco, in 1940 and subsequently taken over by the Vichy Government and renamed Saint Edmond. In November 1942, she was scuttled at Port Lyautey. Saint Edmond was raised in January 1943, and passed to the Ministry of War Transport (MoWT), regaining her previous name Storaa. On 3 November 1943, Storaa was torpedoed and sunk by German Fast attack S 138 off Hastings whilst a member of Convoy CW 221.

== Description ==
The ship was built as yard number 371 in 1918 by the Greenock & Grangemouth Dockyard Company, Grangemouth. She was completed in April 1918.

The ship was 280 feet 0 inches (85.34 m) long, with a beam of 41 feet 9 inches (12.73 m). She had a depth of 18 feet 9 inches (5.72 m) and a draught of 18 feet 1 inch (5.51 m).

The ship was propelled by a triple expansion steam engine, which had cylinders of 21 inches (53 cm), 35 inches (89 cm) and 57 inches (140 cm) diameter by 36 inches (91 cm) stroke. The engine was built by Dunsmuir & Jackson Ltd, Glasgow.

== History ==
Wellpark was one of a series of six ships built by Greenock & Grangemouth Dockyard Company for Denholm Line Steamers Ltd, the others being Broompark, Denpark, Elmpark, Hazelpark and Heathpark. She was operated under the management of J & J Denholm Ltd. Her port of registry was Greenock. The United Kingdom Official Number 142265 was allocated. In 1928, she was sold to the SA Navex Société d'Expédition et de Navigation and renamed Navex. Her port of registry was changed to Antwerp and the Code Letters MNRA were allocated. In 1934, her Code letters were changed to OOXA.

On 21 January 1937, Navex was sold to Société Belge d'Entreprises Commerciales (Sodeco), Antwerp. She was renamed Prina and placed under the management of NV Nederlandsch Bevrachtingskantoor. Her Code Letters were changed to ONKD. Prina was used to supply Republican-held ports during the Spanish Civil War. She was the only ship owned by Sodeco operated under the Belgian Flag. The company's other three ships operated under the Panamanian flag. On 7 May 1938, Prina was sold to the NV Europeësche Vrachtvaart Maatscappij, Rotterdam and was renamed Willy. Her port of registry was changed to Amsterdam and the Code Letters PIQI were allocated. Willy remained under the management of NV Nederlandsch Bevrachtingskantoor.

In 1939, Willy was sold to Dampskibs Hetland AS and renamed Storaa, which is the Danish for "Big River". Her port of registry was changed to Copenhagen, and the Code Letters OZDP were allocated.

== War service ==
On 9 April 1940, Storaa was requisitioned at Grangemouth by the Ministry of Shipping. She was reflagged to the United Kingdom. Her port of registry was changed to London and the Code Letters GLDG were allocated, with the ship regaining her Official Number 142256. She was operated under the management of W T Gould Ltd, Cardiff. In June 1940, Storaa was detained at Casablanca, Morocco. Her crew were imprisoned, but they escaped deportation to a German work camp when the Allies invaded French North Africa.

Storaa was seized by the Vichy Government and renamed Saint Edmond. She was scuttled at Port Lyautey, Morocco in November 1942. In January 1943, she was refloated. The ship was renamed Storaa, and passed to the MoWT. She was refitted by her crew, and returned to the United Kingdom in June 1943.

== Sinking ==
From 1941, the MOWT had the power to requisition merchant ships, regulate and control the movement of ships and regulate the trade and the type and amount of cargo they carried. The MOWT also acted as the owning authority for all ships under government control.

On 2 November 1943, Storaa left Southend as part of Convoy CW 221, the 221st convoy proceeding along the Channel Westwards, transporting 2500 tons of tank parts from to a weapons factory in Cardiff. HMS Whitshead was the escort to the convoy which consisted of 19 Merchant ships including Storaa. The bills of loading show that it had a cargo of 376 tons of steel slabs, 250 tons of steel billets and 608 tons of pig iron (a total of 1,234 tons). However, a contemporary account by a survivor, 3rd officer, H B Knudsen, describes the cargo as "tank parts and aircraft". Mr Knudsen describes loading the cargo:

When we had unloaded the pulp, we then began to load caterpillar tracks for the so-called "belt vehicles", which was very heavy material almost solid iron. That was put in the bottom of the ship, and then we filled up the rest with aeroplanes in large boxes. We even had some as deck cargo.

According to Mr Knudsen, the ship was armed with one 12 pdr., 4 Oerlikons, 1 Strip Lewis and 2 P.A.C. Rockets. The crew was made up of a British and Danish volunteers under a Danish master and also included 4 Naval and 3 Army DEMS Gunners, and there was one passenger (a pilot). As part of the convoy, Storaa was legally required to defend herself and the rest of the convoy. The Dover Strait and Wold Channel (known as Hell's Corner and E-boat alley), were the most dangerous sea passages in the world.

Just after midnight on 3 November 1943 German E-boats were sighted. HMS Whitshead and the Storaa opened fire and the E-boats were driven off, but a quarter of an hour later a torpedo fired by S 138 struck Storaa amidships. She was heavily laden and sank quickly. Of the total of 36 people on board, 22 were lost (master, 1st and 2nd officers, 2nd and 3rd engineers, steward, cook, 1 naval and 2 army gunners, and 12 crew). Seven survivors from the Storaa were picked up by an English coaster which was also part of the convoy, the rest being rescued by an M.L., and all were taken to Newhaven.

== Designation under the Protection of Military Remains Act ==
In 1985 John Short purchased for £150 the salvage rights to Storaa, which lies in about 100 feet (30 m) of water some 9 nautical miles (17 km) off the East Sussex coast near Hastings. A year later, in 1986, the Protection of Military Remains Act 1986 came into law. Local historian and maritime archaeologist, Dr Peter Marsden, Director of the Hastings Shipwreck Heritage Centre, wrote to the Ministry of Defence in April 2000, requesting that Storaa should be designated under the Act. On 25 May 2000, the Ministry of Defence wrote back, refusing the request on the grounds that the vessel was not eligible to be designated under the Act, because it was not in military service at the time.

One of the men of the Royal Navy who had died on Storaa was Petty Officer James Varndell, who was 44 at the time. In 2003, his daughters Rosemary Fogg and Valerie Ledgard made an application to the Ministry of Defence to designate the wreck to protect it as a war grave. Their request was also refused by the Ministry of Defence. However, supported by Dr Marsden and by the Merchant Navy Association, they launched a request for a judicial review of the decision, which was heard by the High Court on 26 October 2005. His decision was that the Act could apply to merchant vessels and that the Secretary of State for Defence was therefore required to reconsider whether the Storaa should be designated under the Act. The judge declined to decide on the legal issues of whether designation interfered with the salvage rights; on a dispute as to whether the wreck had been correctly identified; and on whether or not she was carrying tank parts or raw materials for the factory. These were matters that the Secretary of State should consider when the question of designation is reconsidered.

The Ministry of Defence appealed the decision, which was heard by the Appeal Court in 2006. The Court of Appeal decision of 5 October 2006 upheld the decision of the High Court.

Wreck divers fear that the case could lead to diving being prohibited on a large number of wrecks.

The wreck was subsequently designated under the Protection of Military Remains Act 1986 in 2008.
