= Krzywiczyny =

- Village
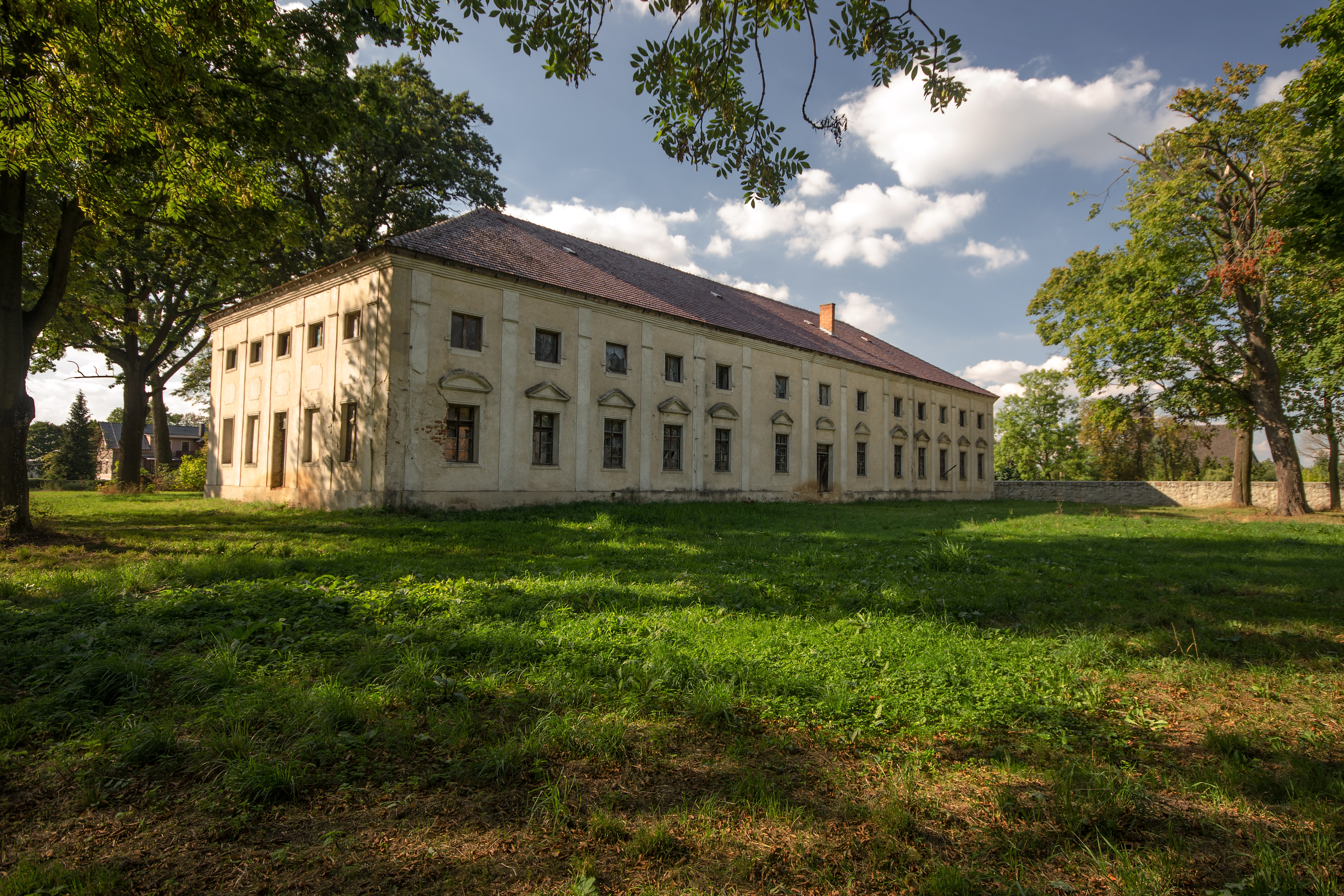
- Palace

- Location within Poland
- Coordinates: 51°4′N 18°3′E
- Country: Poland
- Voivodeship: Opole
- County: Kluczbork
- Gmina: Wołczyn
- Website: http://www.krzywiczyny.xtreemhost.com

Krzywiczyny [kʂɨviˈt͡ʂɨnɨ] is a village in the administrative district of Gmina Wołczyn, within Kluczbork County, Opole Voivodeship, in south-western Poland.
