= Markotów Duży =

- Village
- Location within Poland
- Coordinates: 50°59′02″N 18°05′03″E
- Country: Poland
- Voivodeship: Opole
- County: Kluczbork
- Gmina: Wołczyn

Markotów Duży [marˈkɔtuf ˈduʐɨ] is a village in the administrative district of Gmina Wołczyn, within Kluczbork County, Opole Voivodeship, in south-western Poland.
