= SM UB-81 =

German Type UB III submarine, built 1917

- UB-148 at sea, a U-boat similar to UB-81.

History

German Empire
- Name: UB-81
- Ordered: 23 September 1916
- Builder: AG Weser, Bremen
- Cost: 3,341,000 German Papiermark
- Yard number: 281
- Laid down: 5 January 1917
- Launched: 18 August 1917
- Commissioned: 18 September 1917
- Fate: Sunk, 2 December 1917

General characteristics
- Class & type: Type UB III submarine
- Type: Coastal submarine
- Displacement: 516 t (508 long tons) surfaced; 647 t (637 long tons) submerged
- Length: 55.85 m (183 ft 3 in) (o/a)
- Beam: 5.80 m (19 ft)
- Draught: 3.72 m (12 ft 2 in)
- Propulsion: 2 shafts; 2 × Körting six-cylinder fourstroke diesel engines, 1,050 bhp (780 kW); 2 × Brown, Boveri & Cie electric motors, 580 kW (780 shp)
- Speed: 13.4 knots (24.8 km/h; 15.4 mph) surfaced; 7.5 knots (13.9 km/h; 8.6 mph) submerged
- Range: 8,180 nmi (15,150 km; 9,410 mi) at 6 knots (11 km/h; 6.9 mph) surfaced; 50 nmi (93 km; 58 mi) at 4 knots (7.4 km/h; 4.6 mph) submerged
- Test depth: 50 m (160 ft)
- Complement: 3 officers, 31 men
- Armament: 5 × 50 cm (19.7 in) torpedo tubes (4 bow, 1 stern); 10 torpedoes; 1 × 8.8 cm (3.46 in) deck gun

Service record
- Part of: Flandern I Flotilla; 11 November – 2 December 1917
- Commanders: Oblt.z.S. Reinhold Saltzwedel; 18 September – 2 December 1917
- Operations: 2 patrols
- Victories: 1 merchant ship sunk (3,218 GRT)

SM UB-81 was a German Type UB III submarine or U-boat in the German Imperial Navy (German: Kaiserliche Marine) during World War I. She was commissioned into the German Imperial Navy on 18 September 1917 as SM UB-81. (Note: "SM" stands for "Seiner Majestät" (English: His Majesty's) and combined with the U for Unterseeboot would be translated as His Majesty's Submarine.)

UB-81 was sunk 2 December 1917 by a naval mine at 50°27′N 0°53′W, 29 crew members died in the event.

== Construction ==
UB-81 was ordered by the GIN on 23 September 1916 and her keel was laid down on 5 January 1917. She was built by AG Weser of Bremen and following just under a year of construction, launched at Bremen on 4 August 1917. UB-81 was commissioned later that same year under the command of Reinhold Saltzwedel. Like all Type UB III submarines, UB-81 carried 10 torpedoes and was armed with a 8.8 cm (3.46 in) deck gun. UB-81 would carry a crew of up to 3 officer and 31 men and had a cruising range of 8,180 nautical miles (15,150 km; 9,410 mi). UB-81 had a displacement of 516 t (508 long tons) while surfaced and 647 t (637 long tons) when submerged. Her engines enabled her to travel at 13.4 knots (24.8 km/h; 15.4 mph) when surfaced and 7.5 knots (13.9 km/h; 8.6 mph) when submerged.

On the night of 30 November/1 December 1917 she torpedoed and sank the 3,218 ton British steamer Molesey 12 miles west-south-west of the Brighton Light Vessel.

== Fate ==
UB-81 struck a mine on the night of 2 December 1917 in the English Channel to the southeast of the Isle of Wight off Dunnose Head. The crew of 34, commanded by Oberleutnant zur See Reinhold Saltzwedel, managed to raise the forward torpedo tubes above the surface and seven crewmen escaped before a collision occurred with a British patrol boat and she sank; another source claims that 35 men were aboard and that six survived. The survivors were rescued by a Royal Navy patrol boat. She now lies at (50°29′24″N 0°58′15″W) OSGB at a depth of 28 metres (92 feet). The wreck is designated as a controlled site under the Protection of Military Remains Act 1986 and therefore all diving on her is strictly prohibited.

== Summary of raiding history ==
Date	Name	Nationality	Tonnage (Note: Tonnages are in gross register tons)	Fate
30 November 1917	Molesey	United Kingdom	3,218	Sunk

== Bibliography ==
- Bendert, Harald (2000). Die UB-Boote der Kaiserlichen Marine, 1914-1918. Einsätze, Erfolge, Schicksal (in German). Hamburg: Verlag E.S. Mittler & Sohn GmbH. ISBN 3-8132-0713-7.
- Gröner, Erich; Jung, Dieter; Maass, Martin (1991). German Warships 1815–1945, U-boats and Mine Warfare Vessels. Vol. 2. Translated by Thomas, Keith; Magowan, Rachel. London: Conway Maritime Press. ISBN 0-85177-593-4.
- Rössler, Eberhard (1979). Die deutschen U-Boote und ihre Werften: eine Bilddokumentation über den deutschen U-Bootbau; in zwei Bänden (in German). Vol. I. Munich: Bernard & Graefe. ISBN 3-7637-5213-7.
