= Duczów Wielki =

- Village
- Location within Poland
- Coordinates: 51°02′25″N 17°57′16″E
- Country: Poland
- Voivodeship: Opole
- County: Kluczbork
- Gmina: Wołczyn

Duczów Wielki (Polish pronunciation: [ˈdutʂuv ˈvjɛlkʲi]) is a village in the administrative district of Gmina Wołczyn, within Kluczbork County, Opole Voivodeship, in south-western Poland.
