= St. Michael's Church, Gierałcice =

Coordinates: 50.5923°N 18.0250°E

St. Michael's Church
- Kościół ewangelicki św. Michała Archanioła w Gierałcicach
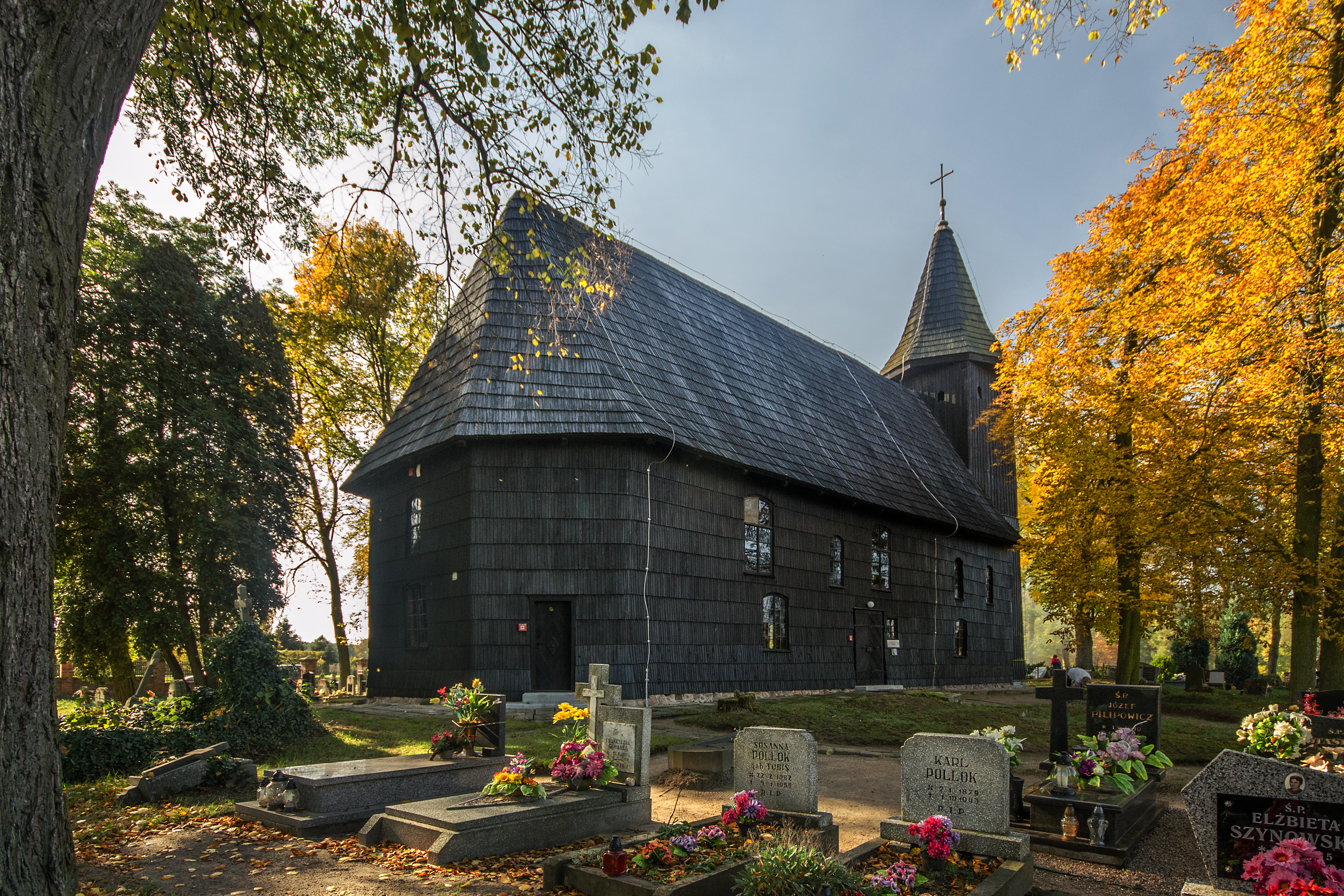
- St. Michael's Church
- St. Michael's Church
- Location: Gierałcice
- Country: Poland
- Denomination: Evangelical Church of the Augsburg Confession

Architecture
- Completed: 1694

Specifications
- Materials: Wood

Administration
- Parish: Parafia Ewangelicko-Augsburska w Wołczynie

St. Michael's Church is a historic, wooden chapel of ease in Gierałcice, Kluczbork County in Poland. The church belongs to the Evangelical Church of the Augsburg Confession in Poland.
