= Markotów Mały =

- Village
- Location within Poland
- Coordinates: 50°59′54″N 18°06′03″E
- Country: Poland
- Voivodeship: Opole
- County: Kluczbork
- Gmina: Wołczyn

Markotów Mały [marˈkɔtuf ˈmawɨ] is a village in the administrative district of Gmina Wołczyn, within Kluczbork County, Opole Voivodeship, in south-western Poland.
