= Ligota Wołczyńska =

- Village
- Location within Poland
- Coordinates: 51°01′23″N 18°01′51″E
- Country: Poland
- Voivodeship: Opole
- County: Kluczbork
- Gmina: Wołczyn

Ligota Wołczyńska [liˈɡɔta vɔu̯ˈt͡ʂɨɲska] is a village in the administrative district of Gmina Wołczyn, within Kluczbork County, Opole Voivodeship, in south-western Poland.
