= Brzezinki, Opole Voivodeship =

Brzezinki
- Village
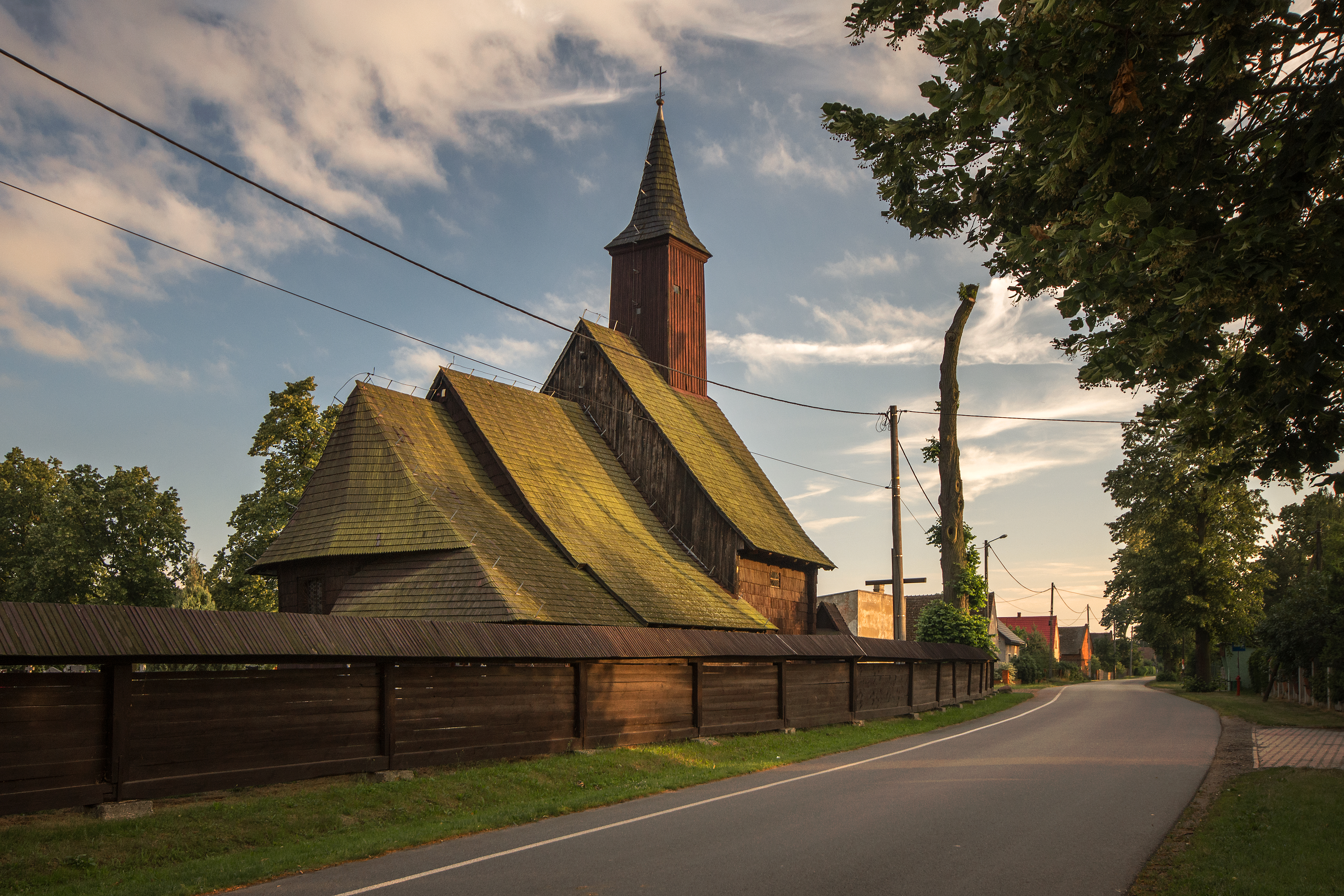
- Church of the Nativity of the Virgin Mary in Brzezinki

- Location within Poland
- Coordinates: 51°2′N 18°5′E
- Country: Poland
- Voivodeship: Opole
- County: Kluczbork
- Gmina: Wołczyn
- Population: 450
- Time zone: UTC+1 (CET)
  - Summer (DST): UTC+2 (CEST)
- Vehicle registration: OKL

Brzezinki [bʐɛˈʑinki] is a village in the administrative district of Gmina Wołczyn, within Kluczbork County, Opole Voivodeship, in south-western Poland.
