= Brynica, Kluczbork County =

Brynica
- Village
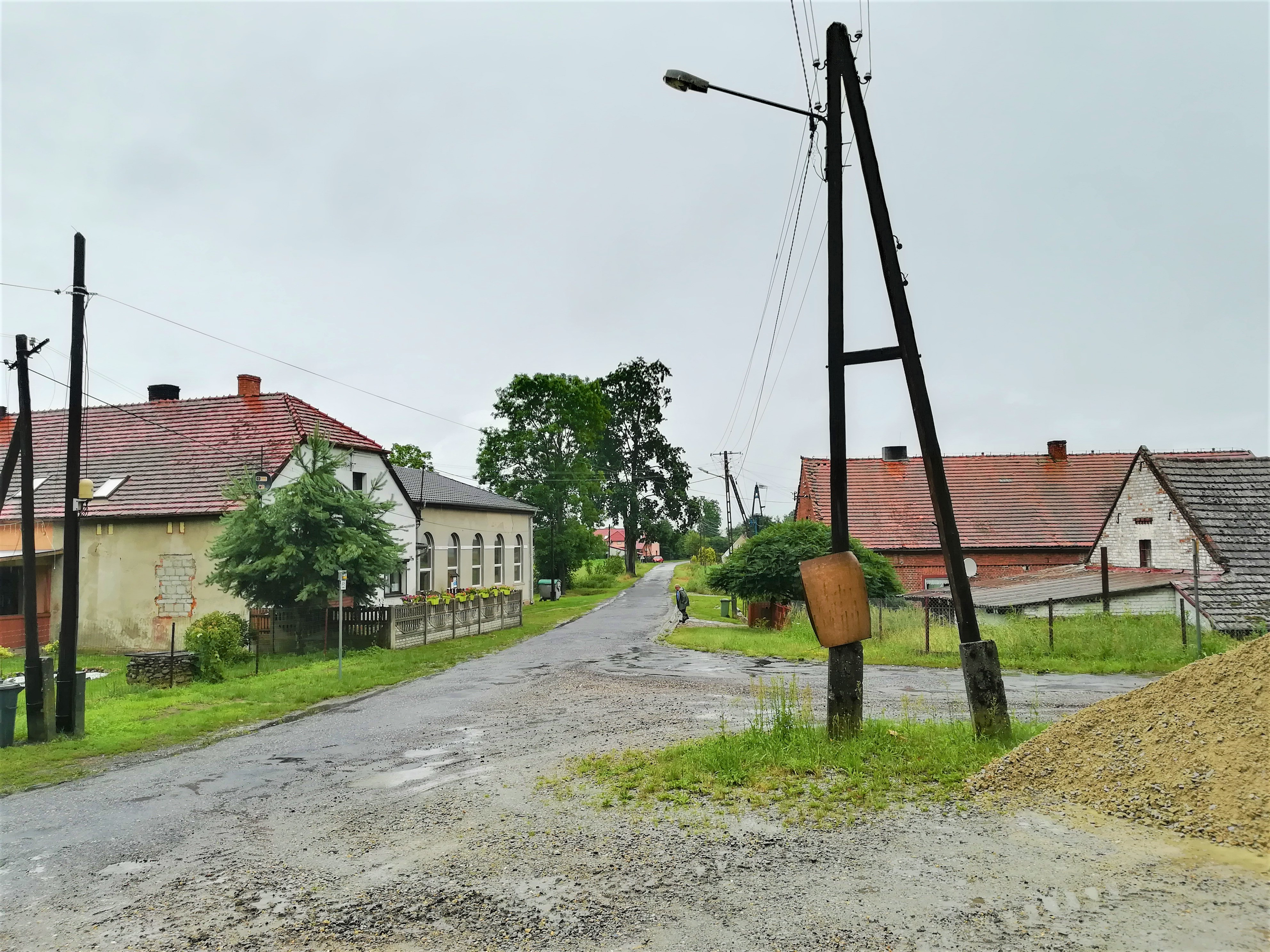

- Location within Poland
- Coordinates: 51°0′10″N 17°59′44″E
- Country: Poland
- Voivodeship: Opole
- County: Kluczbork
- Gmina: Wołczyn

Brynica [brɨˈnit͡sa] is a village in the administrative district of Gmina Wołczyn, within Kluczbork County, Opole Voivodeship, in south-western Poland.
