= Wierzbica Dolna =

- Village
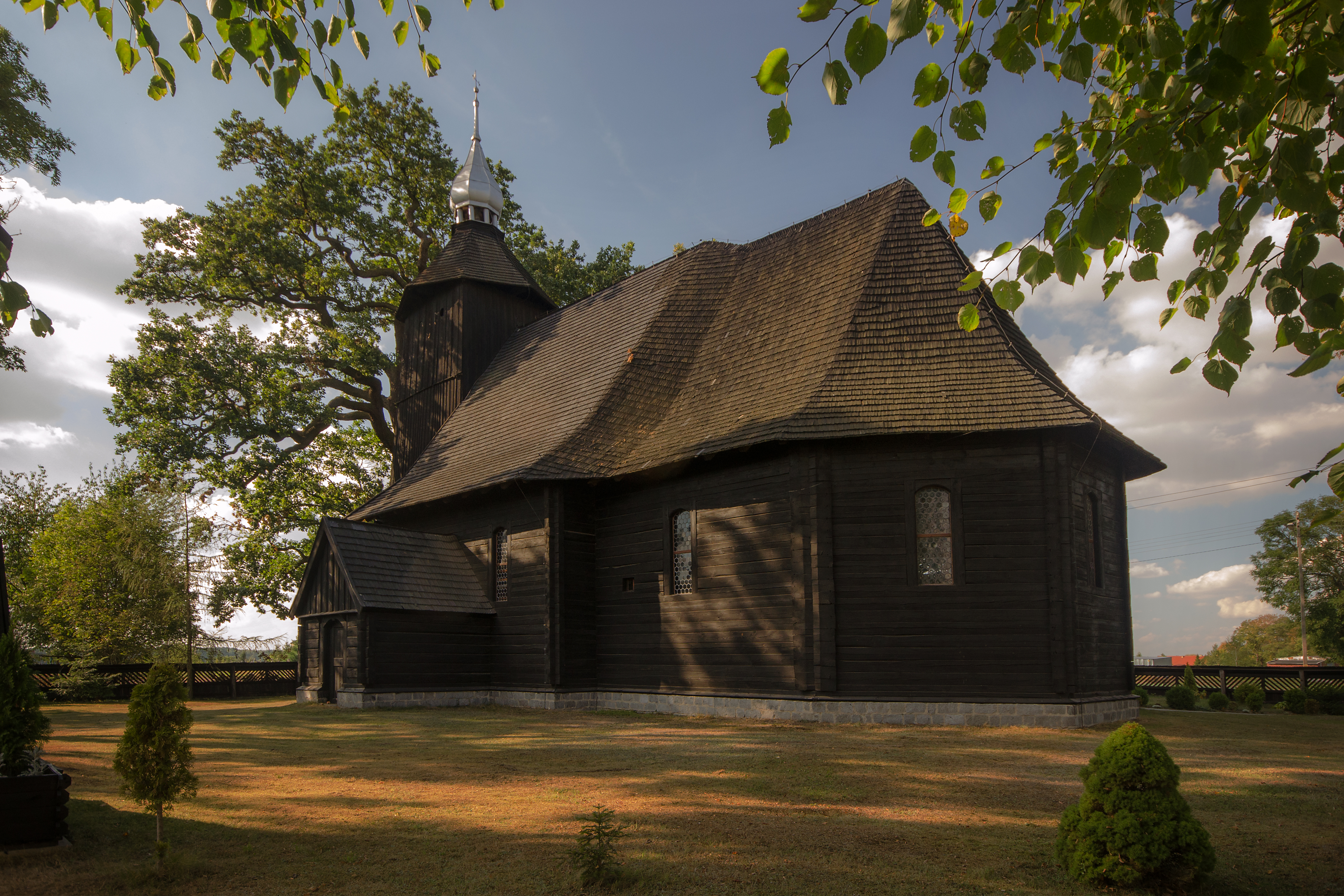
- Exaltation of the Holy Cross church in Wierzbica Dolna

- Location within Poland
- Coordinates: 51°03′22″N 17°59′18″E
- Country: Poland
- Voivodeship: Opole
- County: Kluczbork
- Gmina: Wołczyn
- Postal code: 46-255

Wierzbica Dolna [vjɛʐˈbit͡sa ˈdɔlna] (German: Deutsch Würbitz, 1936–1945 Niederweiden O.S.) is a village in the administrative district of Gmina Wołczyn, within Kluczbork County, Opole Voivodeship, in southern Poland.

In 1950 it was incorporated into the Opole Voivodeship. In 1999, Wierzbica Dolna became part of the newly founded Kluczbork County.
