= Gmina Wołczyn =

Gmina Wołczyn Wołczyn Commune
- Gmina
- Coat of arms
- Interactive map of Gmina Wołczyn
- Coordinates (Wołczyn): 51°1′6″N 18°3′25″E
- Country: Poland
- Voivodeship: Opole
- County: Kluczbork
- Seat: Wołczyn

Area
  - Total: 240.86 km^{2} (93.00 sq mi)

Population (2019-06-30)
  - Total: 13,579
  - Density: 56.377/km^{2} (146.02/sq mi)
  - Urban: 5,907
  - Rural: 7,672
- Website: http://wolczyn.pl

Gmina Wołczyn is an urban-rural gmina (administrative district) in Kluczbork County, Opole Voivodeship, in south-western Poland. Its seat is the town of Wołczyn, which lies approximately 12 kilometres (7 mi) west of Kluczbork and 40 km (25 mi) north of the regional capital Opole.

The gmina covers an area of 240.86 square kilometres (93.0 sq mi), and as of 2019 its total population is 13,579.

The gmina contains part of the protected area called Stobrawa Landscape Park.

== Villages ==
Apart from the town of Wołczyn, Gmina Wołczyn contains the villages and settlements of Bruny, Brynica, Brzezinki, Duczów Mały, Duczów Wielki, Gierałcice, Komorzno, Krzywiczyny, Ligota Wołczyńska, Markotów Duży, Markotów Mały, Rożnów, Skałągi, Świniary Małe, Świniary Wielkie, Szklarnia Szymonkowska, Szum, Szymonków, Wąsice, Wierzbica Dolna, Wierzbica Górna and Wierzchy.

== Neighbouring gminas ==
Gmina Wołczyn is bordered by the gminas of Byczyna, Domaszowice, Kluczbork, Murów, Pokój, Rychtal and Trzcinica.

== Twin towns – sister cities ==
Gmina Wołczyn is twinned with:

- Haßloch, Germany
- Kerekegyháza, Hungary
