= Květná =

- Municipality
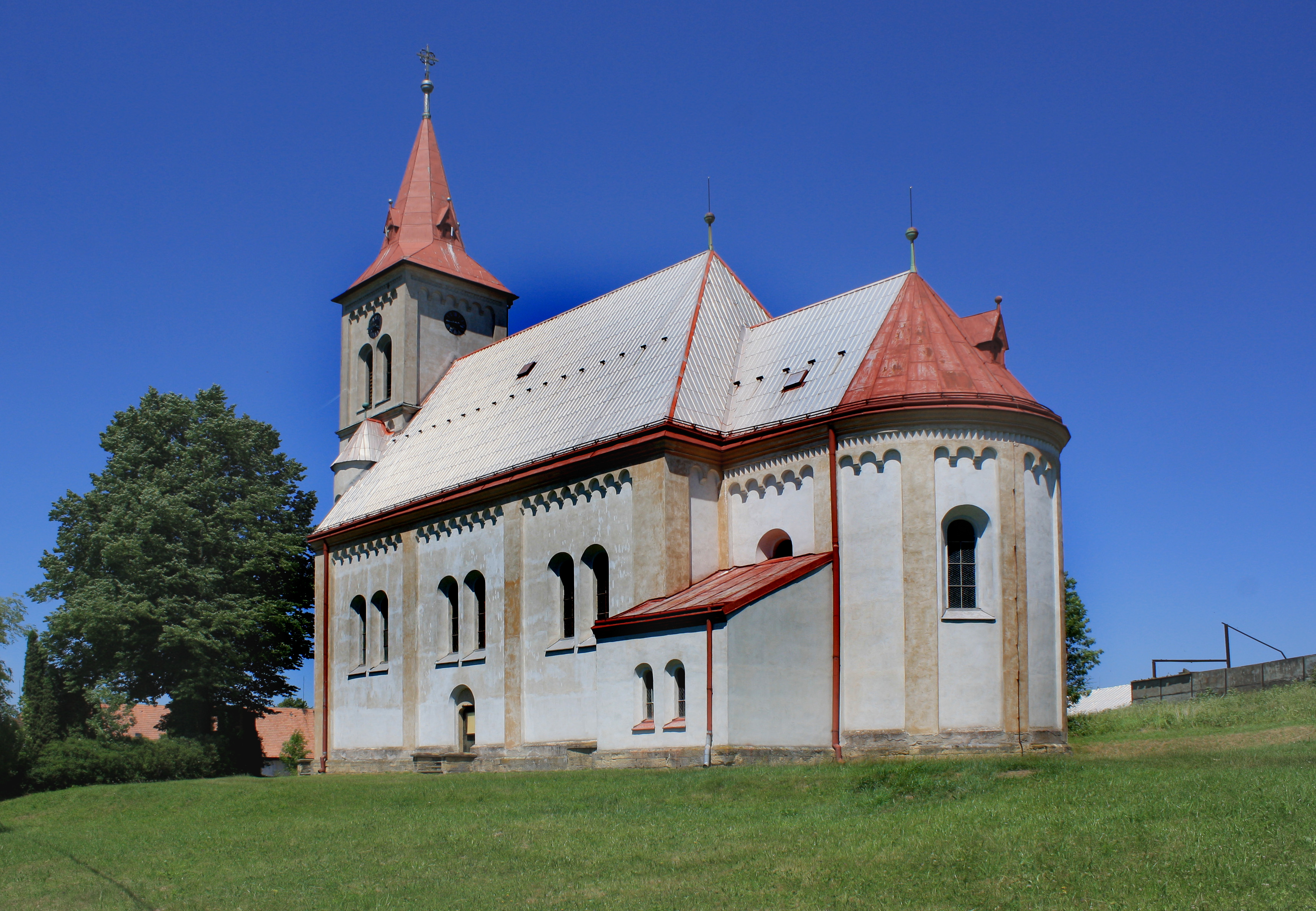
- Church of Saint Lawrence

- Flag Coat of arms

- Location in the Czech Republic
- Coordinates: 49°44′11″N 16°20′46″E
- Country: Czech Republic
- Region: Pardubice
- District: Svitavy
- First mentioned: 1347

Area
  - Total: 9.04 km^{2} (3.49 sq mi)
- Elevation: 575 m (1,886 ft)

Population (2026-01-01)
  - Total: 425
  - Density: 47.0/km^{2} (122/sq mi)
- Time zone: UTC+1 (CET)
  - Summer (DST): UTC+2 (CEST)
- Postal code: 572 01
- Website: www.kvetna.cz

Květná is a municipality and village in Svitavy District in the Pardubice Region of the Czech Republic. It has about 400 inhabitants.

Květná lies approximately 10 kilometres (6 mi) west of Svitavy, 53 km (33 mi) south-east of Pardubice, and 144 km (89 mi) east of Prague.

== Demographics ==
Historical population
Year	Pop.	±%
1869	734	—
1880	758	+3.3%
1890	684	−9.8%
1900	690	+0.9%
1910	634	−8.1%
1921	660	+4.1%
1930	645	−2.3%
1950	395	−38.8%
1961	448	+13.4%
1970	391	−12.7%
1980	303	−22.5%
1991	256	−15.5%
2001	325	+27.0%
2011	381	+17.2%
2021	369	−3.1%
Source: Censuses

== Notable people ==
- Ludwig Wieden (1869–1947), Austrian painter
