= Świniary Małe =

- Village
- Location within Poland
- Coordinates: 51°4′42″N 17°57′41″E
- Country: Poland
- Voivodeship: Opole
- County: Kluczbork
- Gmina: Wołczyn

Świniary Małe [ɕfiˈɲarɨ ˈmawɛ] (German: Klein Blumenau) is a village in the administrative district of Gmina Wołczyn, within Kluczbork County, Opole Voivodeship, in south-western Poland.

For the history of the region, see Upper Silesia.
