= Wołczyn =

Town in Opole Voivodeship, Poland

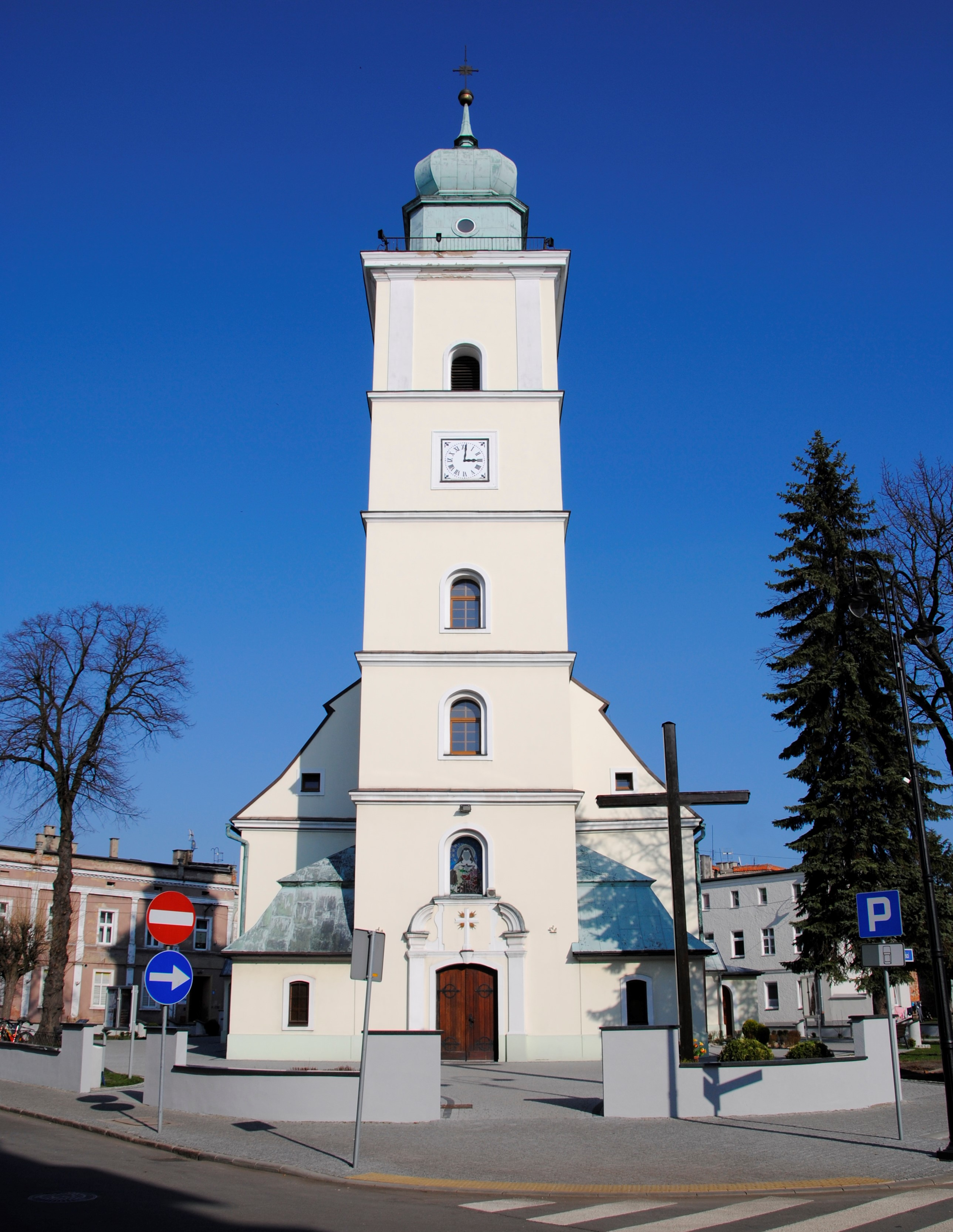
- Saint Thérèse of Lisieux church

- Coat of arms

- Location within Poland
- Coordinates: 51°1′6″N 18°3′25″E
- Country: Poland
- Voivodeship: Opole
- County: Kluczbork
- Gmina: Wołczyn
- Town rights: 1261

Area
  - Total: 7.47 km^{2} (2.88 sq mi)
- Elevation: 170 m (560 ft)

Population (2019-06-30)
  - Total: 5,907
  - Density: 791/km^{2} (2,050/sq mi)
- Time zone: UTC+1 (CET)
  - Summer (DST): UTC+2 (CEST)
- Postal code: 46–250
- Area code: +48 77
- Vehicle registration: OKL
- Website: wolczyn.pl

Wołczyn [ˈvɔu̯t͡ʂɨn] (German: Konstadt) is a town in Kluczbork County, Opole Voivodeship, southern Poland, with 5,907 inhabitants as of 2019. According to 2011 data, it covers 7.47 square kilometres (2.88 square miles), and is the seat of Gmina Wołczyn. It is located within the historic region of Lower Silesia.

== History ==
Historic churches of Wołczyn

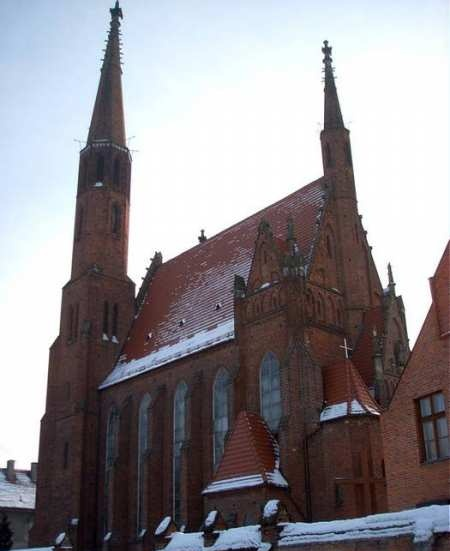
Catholic Church of the Immaculate Conception of the Holy Virgin Mary

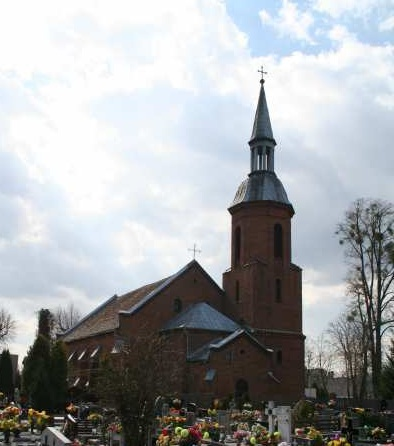
Lutheran Church

The name of the town is derived from the Polish word wół, which means "ox". In the early 14th-century Liber fundationis episcopatus Vratislaviensis the town appeared under the Latinized name Welczyn. The town was probably founded on the site of a former Slavic settlement. A new settlement under town rights was granted to knight Kuntzo, brother of Ulrich, in 1261. It was part of various duchies of fragmented Poland. Until 1294 it was part of the Duchy of Wrocław, afterwards the Duchy of Głogów until 1312, Duchy of Namysłów until 1320, Duchy of Oleśnica until 1343, Duchy of Brzeg until 1436 and afterwards the Duchy of Oleśnica again. It remained under the rule of the Piast dynasty until 1495, and afterwards, for about 300 years, the town was owned by the magnate Posadowski family, under the suzerainty of the Jagiellonian-ruled Bohemian (Czech) Kingdom, itself part of the Holy Roman Empire, until 1526, when the Habsburgs inherited the Bohemian Crown.

The town, initially to be renamed „Fürstenthal", was eventually called Kunzenstad after the duke's name, which evolved to Konstadt. The town was located on a trade route connecting Kraków and Wrocław. The population made a living from agriculture, crafts and trade. Five annual fairs were held in Konstadt, and crops and handicrafts were sold to customers not only from Silesia, but also from neighboring Greater Poland. In the 15th century the Czech Hussites and in the 17th century Polish Brethren settled in Konstadt. In the 16th century, a municipal school known for its high level of education was established there, and in the 18th and early 19th centuries there was a well-known proseminar for Polish Lutherans, later moved to Kluczbork.

In 1742 the town was annexed by the Kingdom of Prussia. On 1 October 1868, the town was connected to a railway line. By 1907 Konstadt had a water supply network. In the final stages of World War II, on 19 January 1945, a German-organized death march of Allied prisoners of war from the Stalag Luft 7 POW camp passed through the town. From 19 to 21 January 1945, fights were fought for the town between Nazi Germany and the Soviets. As a result, 40% of the town's buildings were in ruins. At the end of the war, the German population of the town was expelled, and the town became part of Poland, although with a Soviet-installed communist regime, which remained in power until the Fall of Communism in the end of the 1980s. The remaining Poles were joined by Poles displaced from former eastern Poland annexed by the Soviet Union.

The Polish anti-communist resistance was active in Wołczyn, and in 1945 it raided a local communist police station. The Młodzieżowa Armia Krajowa (Youth Home Army) and Nadzieja (Hope) resistance organizations operated in Wołczyn.

Since 1994, the town has hosted an annual "Spotkania Młodych" (Meeting of Youth). It is organized by the Order of Friars Minor Capuchin.

== Twin towns – sister cities ==
See twin towns of Gmina Wołczyn.
