= Świniary Wielkie =

- Village
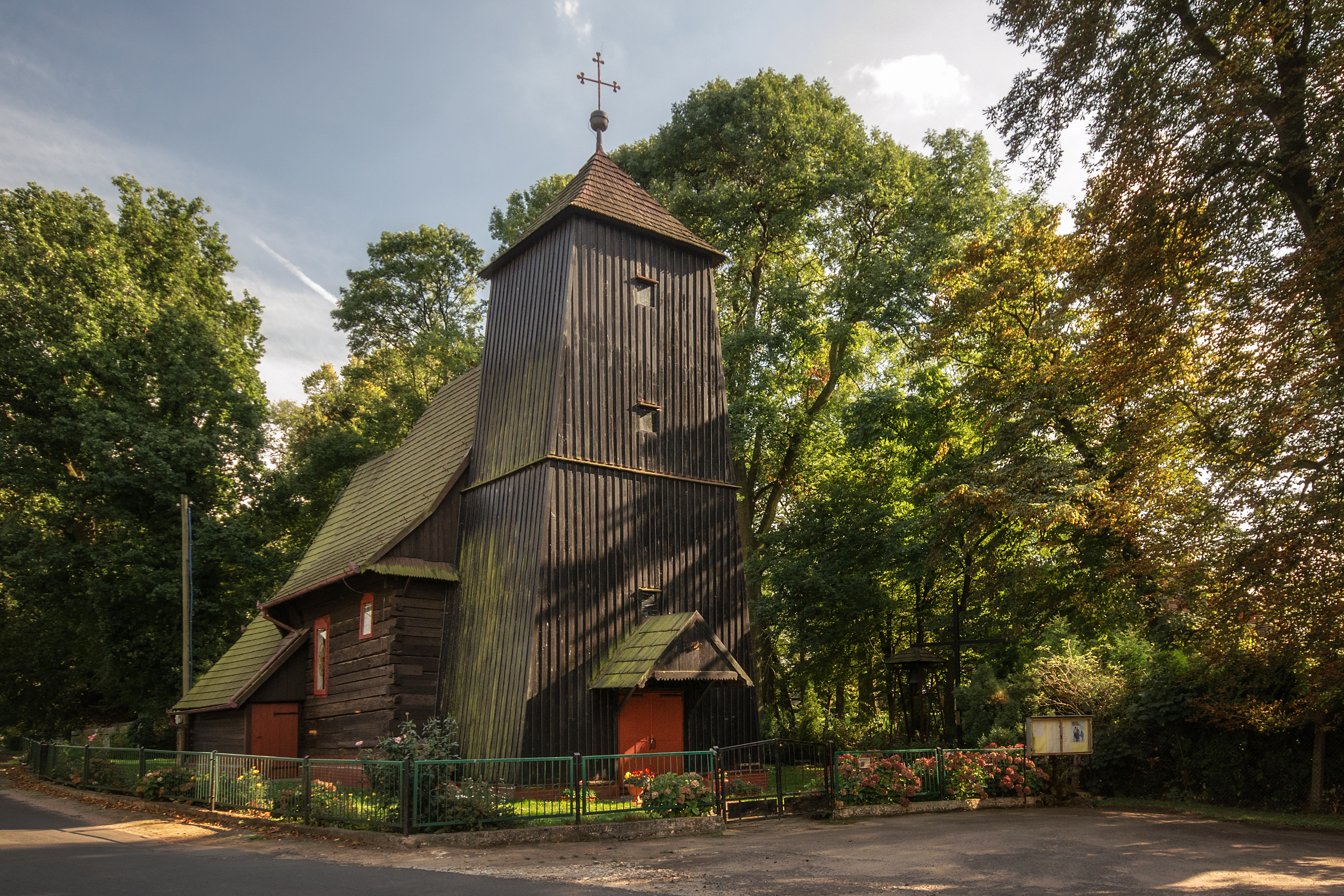
- Saint Bartholomew Church

- Location within Poland
- Coordinates: 51°4′N 18°0′E
- Country: Poland
- Voivodeship: Opole
- County: Kluczbork
- Gmina: Wołczyn

Świniary Wielkie [ɕfiˈɲarɨ ˈvjɛlkʲɛ] is a village in the administrative district of Gmina Wołczyn, within Kluczbork County, Opole Voivodeship, in south-western Poland.
