= Wierzbica Górna =

- Village
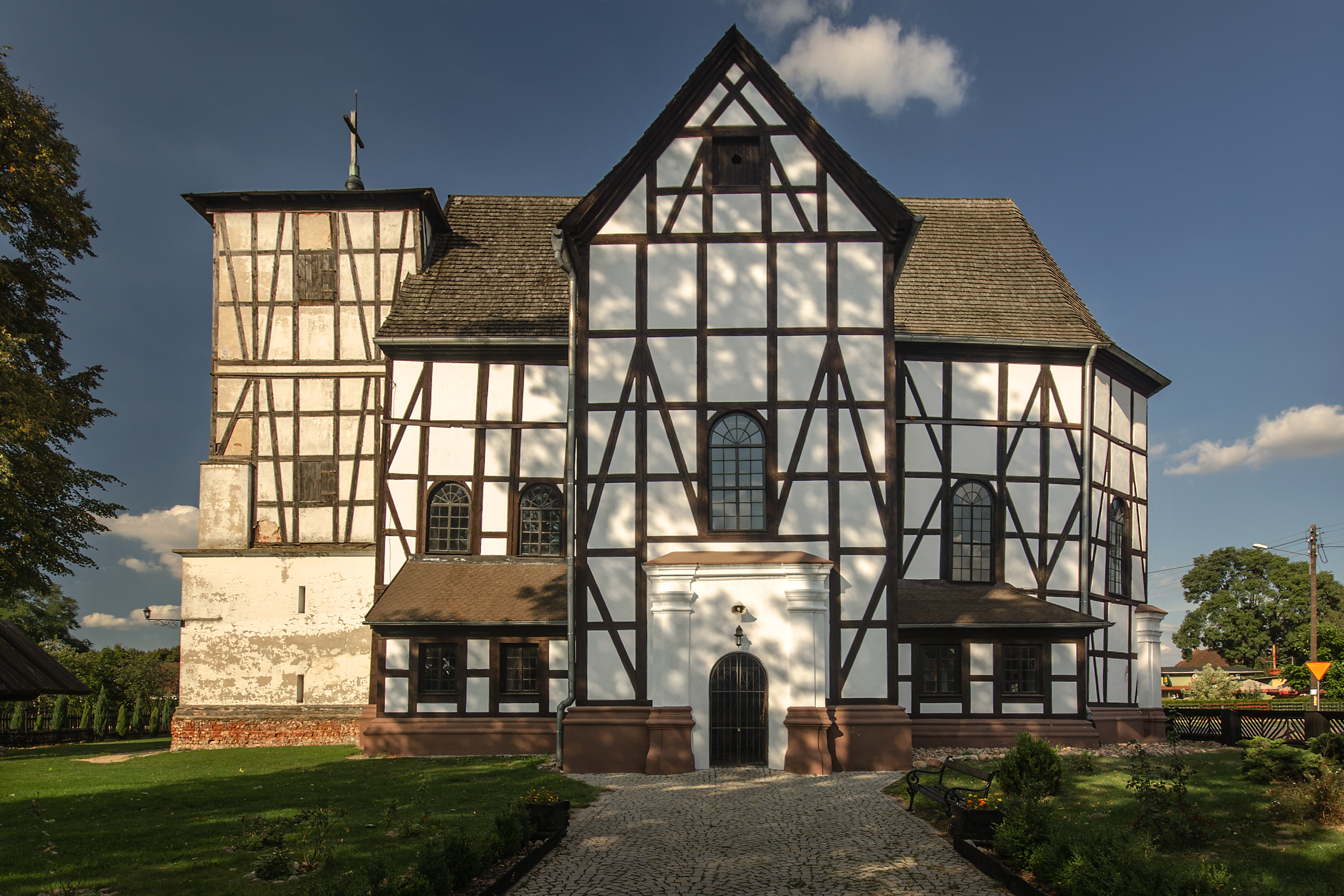
- Catholic church

- Location within Poland
- Coordinates: 51°1′40″N 17°58′46″E
- Country: Poland
- Voivodeship: Opole
- County: Kluczbork
- Gmina: Wołczyn
- Population: 1,141

Wierzbica Górna [vjɛʐˈbit͡sa ˈɡurna] is a village in the administrative district of Gmina Wołczyn, within Kluczbork County, Opole Voivodeship, in south-western Poland.

In 1945–1954 it was the seat of the rural administrative district of Wierzbica Górna.

In 1975–1998 it administratively belonged to the province of Opole.

Belonging to Wierzbica Górna are the rural hamlets Międzybrodzie and Leśnicówka (Wałda) along with settlements Cegielnia ('brickyard') and Kołaczek ('circular wedding bread').

For the history of the region, see Upper Silesia.

== Name history ==
In 1295 the Latin Chronicle Liber fundationis episcopatus Vratislaviensis (English: The Book of the Salaries of the Bishops of Wrocław) lists the town in the Latin as Wirzbicze superiori in the passage Wirzbicze superiori et inferiori. It also gives the name as Wirbicz polonicalis indicating that it was named according to Polish law.

The geographical Dictionary of the Kingdom of Poland issued at the turn of the 19th and 20th centuries has the name as Wierzbica Polska in Polish and Polnisch Wuerbitz in German.

In 1911, when it was part of the German Empire, the rural community of Polnisch Würbitz was renamed Würbitz. On May 27, 1936, the name of the place was changed to Oberweiden O.S.
