= Bielschowsky =

Bielschowsky is a surname. Notable people with the surname include:

- Albert Bielschowsky (1847–1902), German literary historian
- Alfred Bielschowsky (1871–1940), German ophthalmologist
- Marianne Bielschowsky (1904–1977), German biochemist
- Max Bielschowsky (1869–1940), German neurologist
