= Fryette's laws =

Fryette's Laws are a set of three laws pertaining to skeletal anatomy named after Harrison Fryette, D.O. The laws are defined as a set of guiding principles used by practitioners of osteopathic medicine to discriminate between dysfunctions in the axial skeleton. The first two laws solely apply to the lumbar and thoracic spinal regions, but the third applies to the entire vertebral column.

== History ==
The first two laws were developed by Dr. Fryette in 1918, and the third was developed by C.R. Nelson, D.O in 1948.

== The three principles ==
1. Principle I: When the spine is in neutral, sidebending to one side will be accompanied by horizontal rotation to the opposite side. This law is observed in type I somatic dysfunction, where more than one vertebra is out of alignment and cannot be returned to neutral by flexion or extension of the vertebrae. The involved group of vertebrae demonstrates a coupled relationship between sidebending and rotation. When the spine is neutral, side bending forces are applied to a group of typical vertebrae and the entire group will rotate toward the opposite side: the side of produced convexity Extreme type I dysfunction is similar to scoliosis.
2. Principle II: When the spine is in a flexed or extended position (non-neutral), sidebending to one side will be accompanied by rotation to the same side. This law is observed in type II somatic dysfunction, where only one vertebral segment is restricted in motion and becomes much worse on flexion or extension. There will be rotation and sidebending in the same direction when this dysfunction is present.
3. Principle III: When motion is introduced in one plane it will modify (reduce) motion in the other two planes. The third principle sums up the other two laws by stating dysfunction in one plane will negatively affect all other planes of motion.

== See also ==
- Osteopathic manipulative medicine
