= Sobotta =

Sobotta is a surname. Notable people with the surname include:

- Barbara Sobotta (1936–2000), Polish sprinter
- Johannes Sobotta (1869–1945), German doctor and anatomist
- Peter Sobotta (born 1987), Polish-born German mixed martial artist
- Piotr Sobotta (born 1940), Polish high jumper
