= Salomon Kalischer =

German physicist and composer (1845–1924)

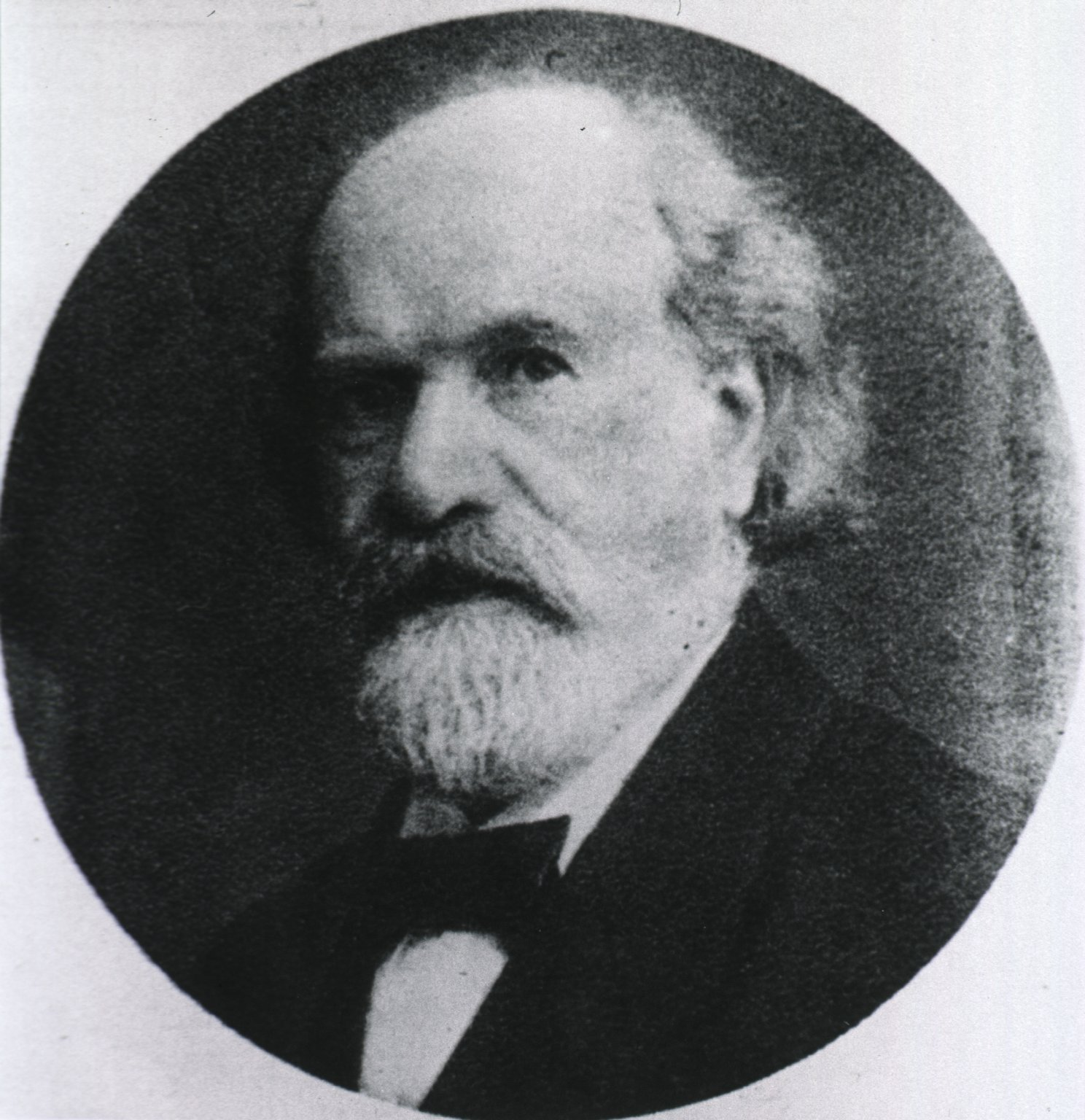
Salomon Kalischer.

Salomon Kalischer, or Solomon Kalischer (8 October 1845 – 22 September 1924), was a German Jewish composer, pianist, and physicist.

Kalischer was born in Thorn (Toruń) in the Province of Prussia, within the Kingdom of Prussia. He studied at the Jewish Theological Seminary of Breslau and the universities of Breslau and Berlin (Ph.D. 1868, his dissertation being "De Aristotelis Rhetoricis et Ethicis Nicomachæis et in Quo et Cur Inter Se quum Congruant tum Differant", awarded a prize by the philosophical faculty of the University of Berlin).

After acting as tutor for a year at Amsterdam he returned to Berlin to study physics and chemistry. In 1876 he established himself as privat-docent at the Bauakademie of Berlin, subsequently connecting himself in the same capacity with the Technische Hochschule at Charlottenburg (now Technische Universität Berlin), at which institution he was appointed lecturer (1894) and professor (1896) of physics. He died in Mariánské Lázně (Marienbad).

== Literary works ==
- Editing of Goethe's scientific works, with notes and introduction (ed. G. Hempel, vols. xxxiii-xxxvi, 1877–79)
- Translated Michael Faraday's "Experimental Researches in Electricity" into German (3 vols. 1889–91)
- Essays on physics, chemistry, and electricity in scientific periodicals
- "Teleologie und Darwinismus" (1878)
- "Die Farbenblindheit" (1879), etc.
- The chapter on "Goethe als Naturforscher" to Albert Bielschowsky's "Goethe-Bibliographie" (ii.412-460, Munich, 1904)
