= Franz Anton Morgenroth =

German violinist and composer

Franz Anton Morgenroth (8 February 1780 – 14 August 1847) was a German violinist and composer. He was a member, later concertmaster, of the court orchestra in Dresden.

== Life ==
Morgenroth was born in 1780 in Namslau in Silesia (now Namysłów in Poland), and was educated in Breslau (now Wrocław) where he learned to play violin and piano. In 1798 he moved to Warsaw, and was an official in the Kriegs- und Domänenkammer. After Napoleon's victory over Prussia in 1806, Morgenroth moved to Dresden.

There he gave music lessons, and studied basso continuo and composition with Christian Ehregott Weinlig. From April 1812 he was one of the musicians of the Hofkapelle in Dresden, where he met Giovanni Battista Polledro (concertmaster from 1816 to 1822) and other musicians who were influential. He became assistant concertmaster in 1828; in 1838, on the death of Antonio Rolla, he became concertmaster. Morgenroth died in Dresden on 14 August 1847.

== Works ==
Compositions include two overtures for orchestra, works for violin, and songs with piano accompaniment.
