= Max Bielschowsky =

German neuropathologist (1869-1940)

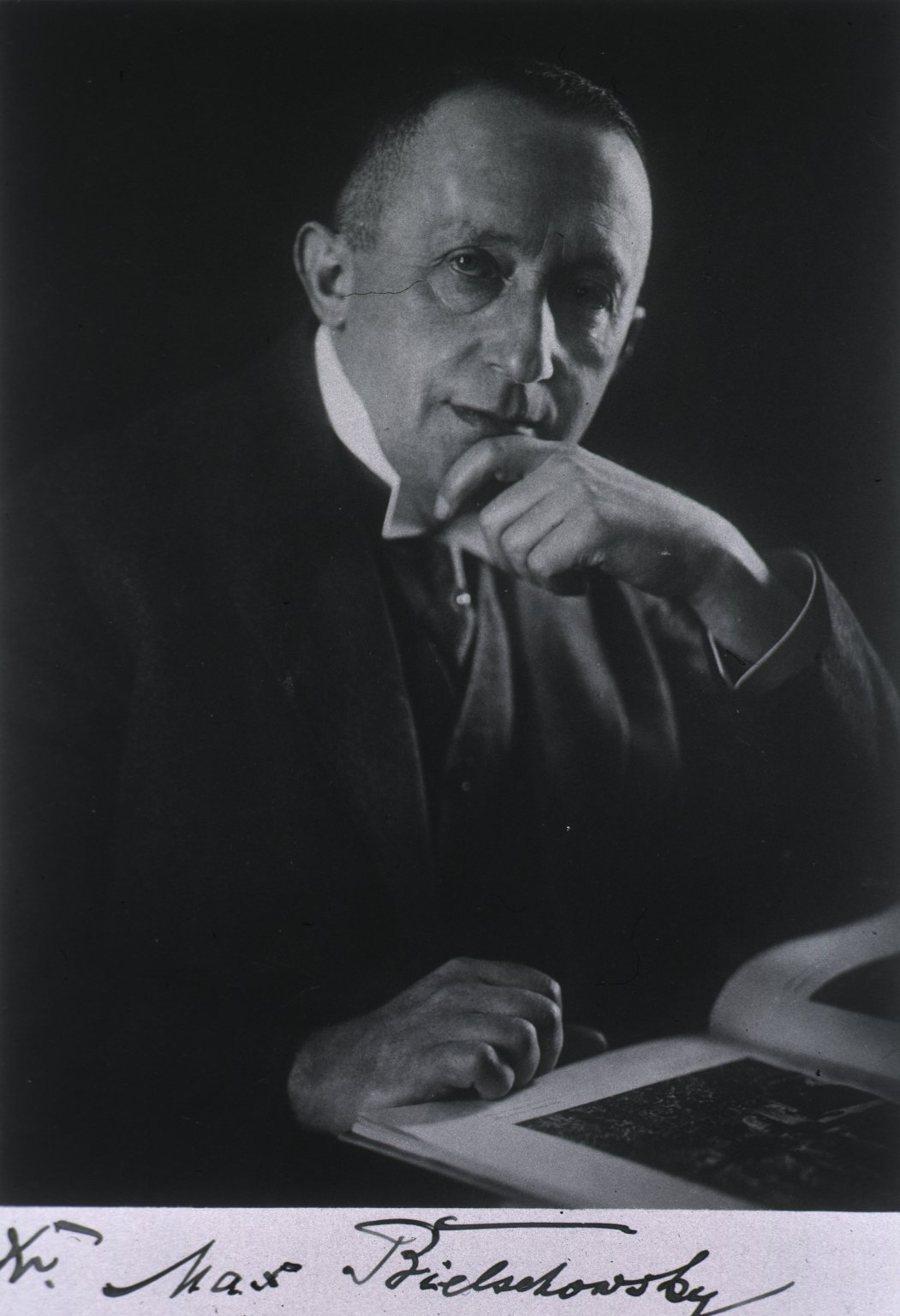
- Bielschowsky, c. 1929
- Born: Max Israel Bielschowsky; 20 February 1869; Breslau
- Died: 15 August 1940 (aged 71)
- Occupation: Neuropathologist
- Relatives: Marianne Angermann (daughter–in–law)

Max Israel Bielschowsky (20 February 1869 – 15 August 1940) was a German neuropathologist born in Breslau.

After receiving his medical doctorate from the Ludwig-Maximilians-Universität München in 1893, he worked with Ludwig Edinger (1855–1918) at the Senckenberg Pathology Institute in Frankfurt-am-Main. At Senckenberg he learned histological staining techniques from Carl Weigert (1845–1904). From 1896 to 1904 he worked in Emanuel Mendel's (1839–1907) psychiatric laboratory in Berlin. In 1904, he joined Oskar Vogt (1870–1959) at the neurobiological laboratory at the University of Berlin, where he remained until 1933. Later in his career he worked at the psychiatric clinic at the University of Utrecht, and at the Cajal Institute in Madrid. He immigrated to the UK, where he died on 15 August 1940 in the Greater London area at 71 years of age. His oldest son, Franz David Bielschowsky, also immigrated to Sheffield, UK and subsequently to Dunedin, New Zealand where he pursued an eminent career in cancer research. Renowned biochemist Marianne Angermann became his daughter–in–law following her marriage to Franz. A cousin of Max Bielschowsky, Albert Bielschowsky (1847–1902), was a biographer of Johann Wolfgang von Goethe.

Bielschowsky made important contributions in his research of tuberous sclerosis, amaurotic idiocy, paralysis agitans, Huntington’s chorea and myotonia congenita. He is remembered for his histopathological work with disseminated sclerosis, the use of an histological silver stain for impregnation of nerve fibers, and with Stanley Cobb, the development of intravital silver staining. The eponymous "Bielschowsky silver stain" technique was an improvement on the method developed by Ramon y Cajal (1852–1934).

== Selected written works ==
- Die Silberimprägnation der Achsencylinder; Neurologisches Zentralblatt, Leipzig, 1902, 21: 579–84. Neurologisches Zentralblatt, Leipzig, 1903, 22: 997–1006; (Bielschowsky stains).
- Allgemeine Histologie und Histopathologie des Nervensystems. In: Max Lewandowsky (publisher), Handbuch der Neurologie. Volume 1, Berlin, 1910.
- Herpes Zoster. In: Max Lewandowsky (publisher): Handbuch der Neurologie. Volume 5, Berlin, 1910.
- Über spätinfantile familiäre amaurotische Idiotie mit Kleinhirnsymptomen. Deutsche Zeitschrift für Nervenheilkunde, 1914, 50: 7–29. (Bielschowsky’s amaurotic idiocy).

== See also ==
- Bielschowsky stain
- Pathology
- List of pathologists
