= Namysłów Town Hall =

Ratusz w Namysłowie (Namysłów Town Hall)
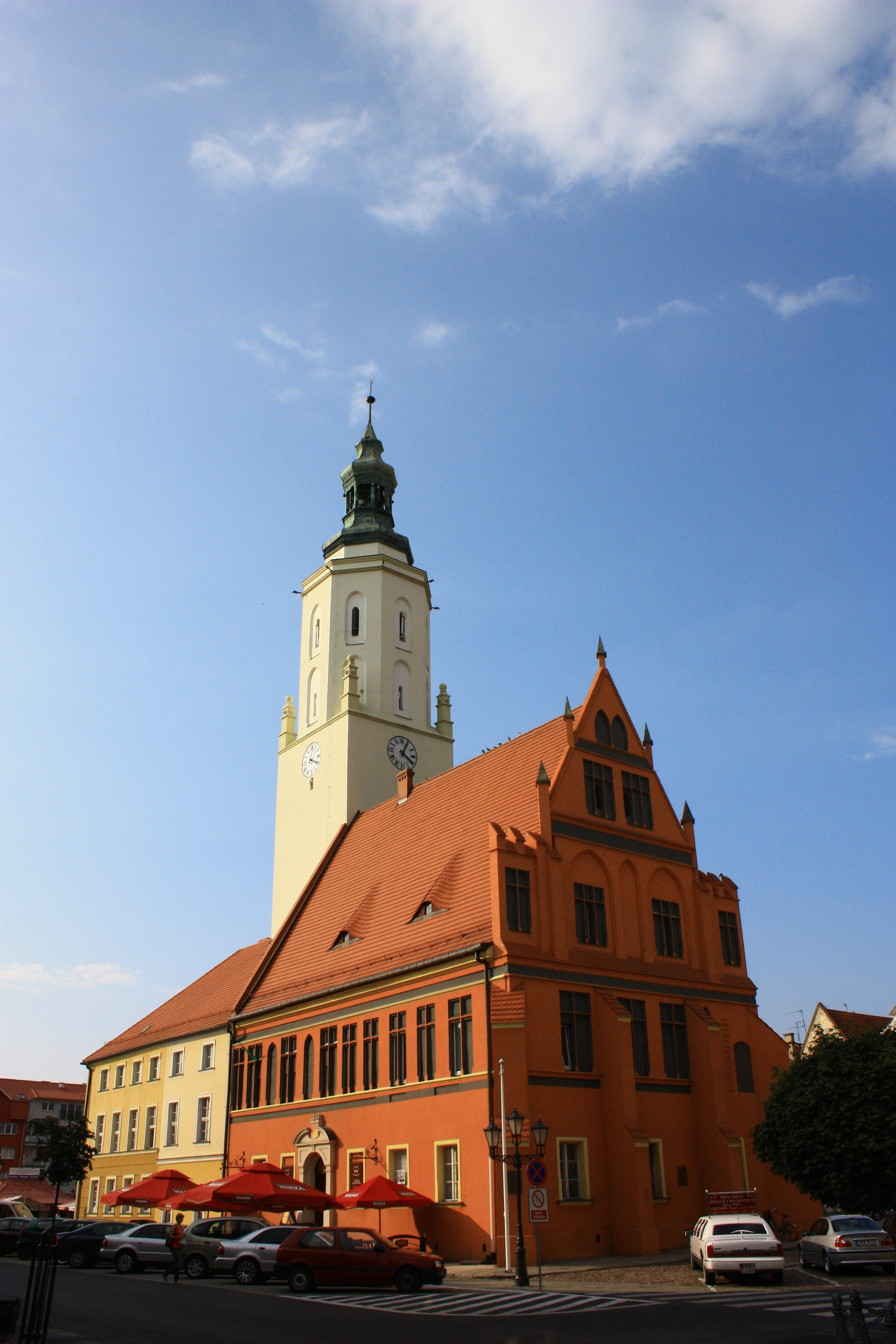
- Namysłów Town Hall
- Interactive map of the Ratusz w Namysłowie (Namysłów Town Hall) area

General information
- Type: Town hall
- Architectural style: Gothic
- Location: Namysłów, Poland
- Coordinates: 51.0766°N 17.7176°E
- Current tenants: Namysłów City Council
- Construction started: 1374
- Completed: 1378
- Owner: Namysłów City

Height
- Height: 57 metres (Tower)

Namysłów Town Hall was built in the second half of the fourteenth century. Formerly built in Gothic style but then built into the Renaissance style, in 2002 the town hall was renovated. Today it is recognised as one of the most beautiful cultural points of heritage in Namysłów. The town hall is the main building in the old town square in the city, located in the centre of the square. The town hall was added to the list of Registered Cultural Heritage with the position 939/64 in 1964.

== Architecture ==
The Namysłów Town Hall is built out of brick and from a bird's eye view resembles the letter L. The main building has two levels. The tower in the lower part has four sides and the upper half has eight sides, where there is a walkway with pinnacles. The bulbous octagonal spire is from the Baroque and is made from a copper plate and topped with a bearing.

== Town hall today ==
The Namysłów Town Hall is the seat of the municipal government in Namysłów and various institutions and authorities: ZUS branch, the Kluczbork Resident Prosecutor's Office, notaries, and Pod Aniołami Restaurant. Every day at 12.00 from the town hall there is a Namysłów bugle call played with three trumpets composed by Eugeniusz Odoj.
