= Namysłów =

Town in Opole Voivodeship, Poland

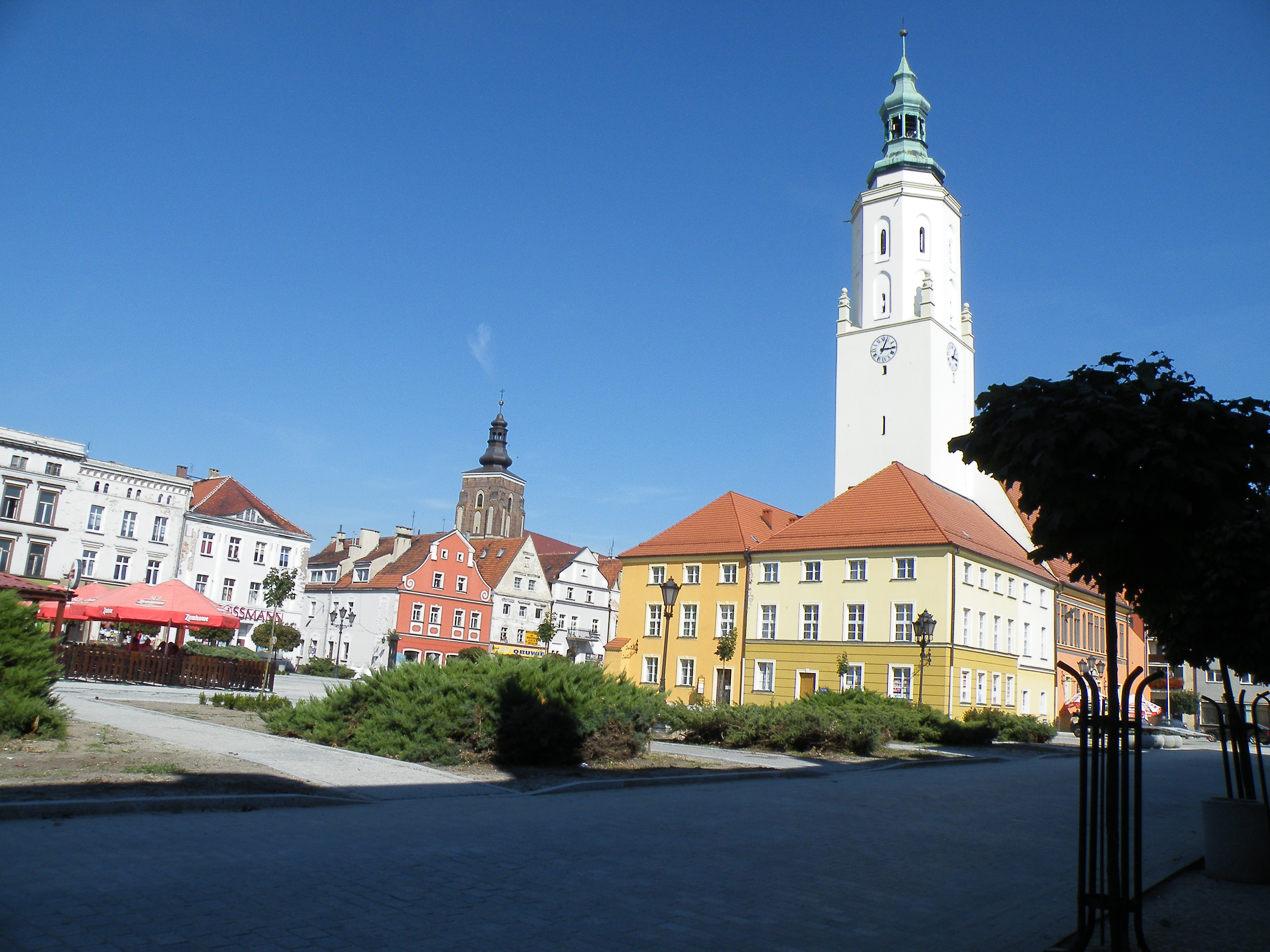
- Market Square with the Town Hall and the Church of Saints Peter and Paul in the background

- Flag Coat of arms

- Location within Poland
- Coordinates: 51°4′22″N 17°42′25″E
- Country: Poland
- Voivodeship: Opole
- County: Namysłów
- Gmina: Namysłów

Government
  - Mayor: Jacek Fior (PO)

Area
  - Total: 22.62 km^{2} (8.73 sq mi)

Population (2024-12-31)
  - Total: 16,716
  - Density: 739.0/km^{2} (1,914/sq mi)
- Time zone: UTC+1 (CET)
  - Summer (DST): UTC+2 (CEST)
- Postal code: 46-100
- Vehicle registration: ONA
- Website: https://namyslow.eu

Namysłów (pronounced NAMI-swoof [naˈmɨswuf], German: Namslau; Silesian: Namysłow) is a historic town in southern Poland, within Opole Voivodeship. Located along the Widawa River, it is the capital of Namysłów County. Its population was 16,551 in 2019.

== History ==
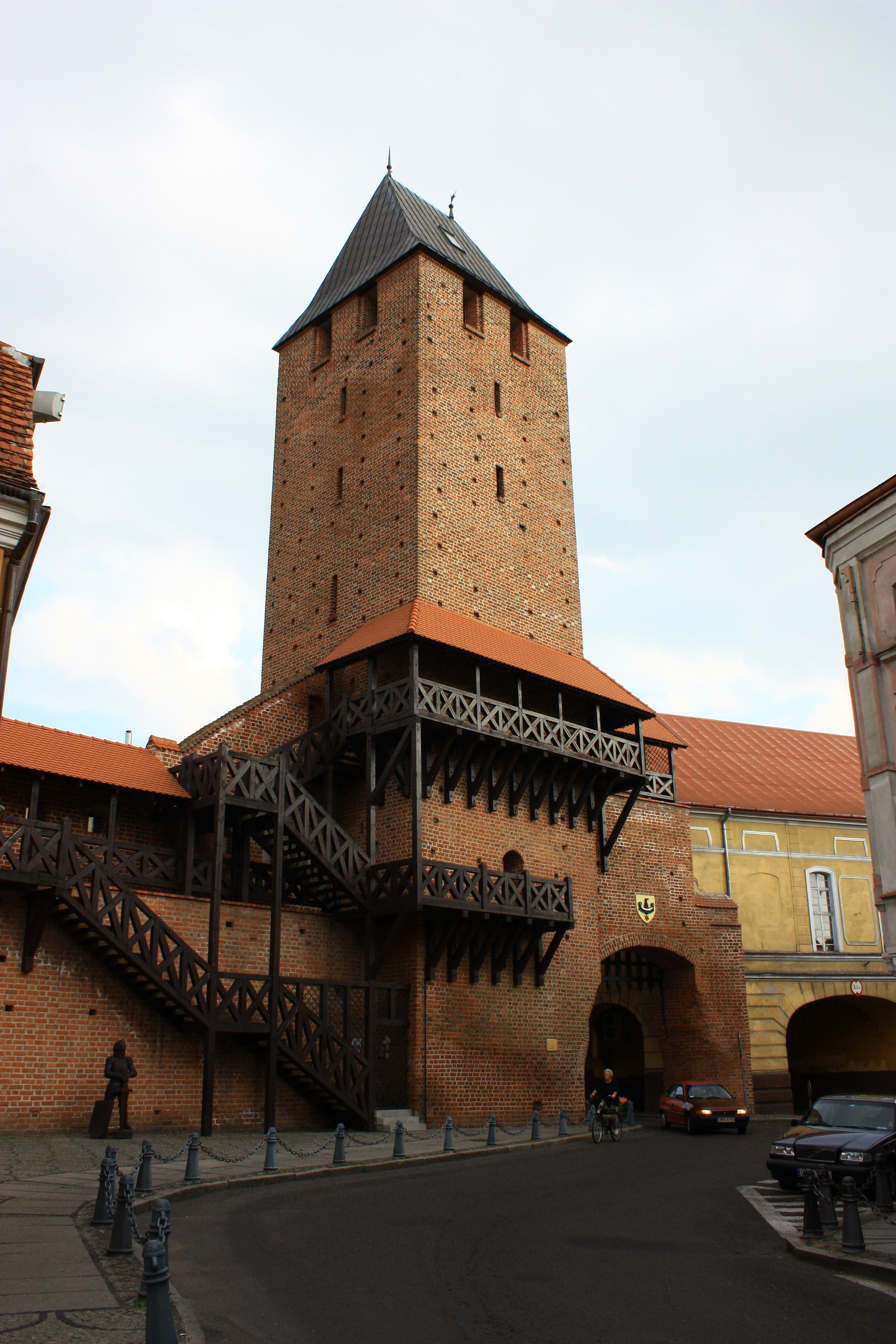
Medieval Krakowska Gate

The town began to develop during the 13th century, but was destroyed in 1241 during the first Mongol invasion of Poland. It was refounded by Polish Duke Bolesław II the Bald in 1249. During the medieval Ostsiedlung it was colonized by Germans, who used the Germanized name Namslau. According to German linguist Heinrich Adamy the town's name is derived from the Polish name namysł, which means "thinking". According to another theory, the name of the city comes from the old Polish name Namysł. In medieval manuscripts and documents such as the Liber fundationis episcopatus Vratislaviensis it appeared under the Latinized name Namislavia. Located within the fragmented Kingdom of Poland, until 1294 it was part of the Duchy of Wrocław, then the Duchy of Głogów, in years 1312–23 it was briefly the seat of the Duchy of Namysłów, then it was part of the Duchy of Brzeg until 1338, then the revamped Duchy of Namysłów again until 1341, and afterwards it came directly under the rule of King Casimir III of Poland until 1348. A castle, first documented in 1312, was a residence of Casimir III in 1341. The Treaty of Namysłów, in which Casimir renounced his claims to Silesia to King Charles IV of Bohemia, was signed in the town in 1348. The town was a center of brewing and clothmaking.

Namysłów was briefly an independent city during the 14th century and was enriched by the trade route from Wrocław to Kraków, especially with linen. The town was unsuccessfully besieged by Hussites in 1428. A privileged rifleman's guild was established in the town in 1434. Besides Wrocław, it was the only Silesian town which refused to pay homage to King Ladislaus the Posthumous in 1453. It passed to the Kingdom of Hungary in 1469 and back to the Bohemian Crown in 1490, ruled by the Jagiellonian dynasty until 1526, and by the House of Habsburg afterwards becoming part of the Habsburg monarchy of Austria. Around 1500, with Lower Silesia having become largely German-speaking, the area around Namysłów had remained Polish-speaking.

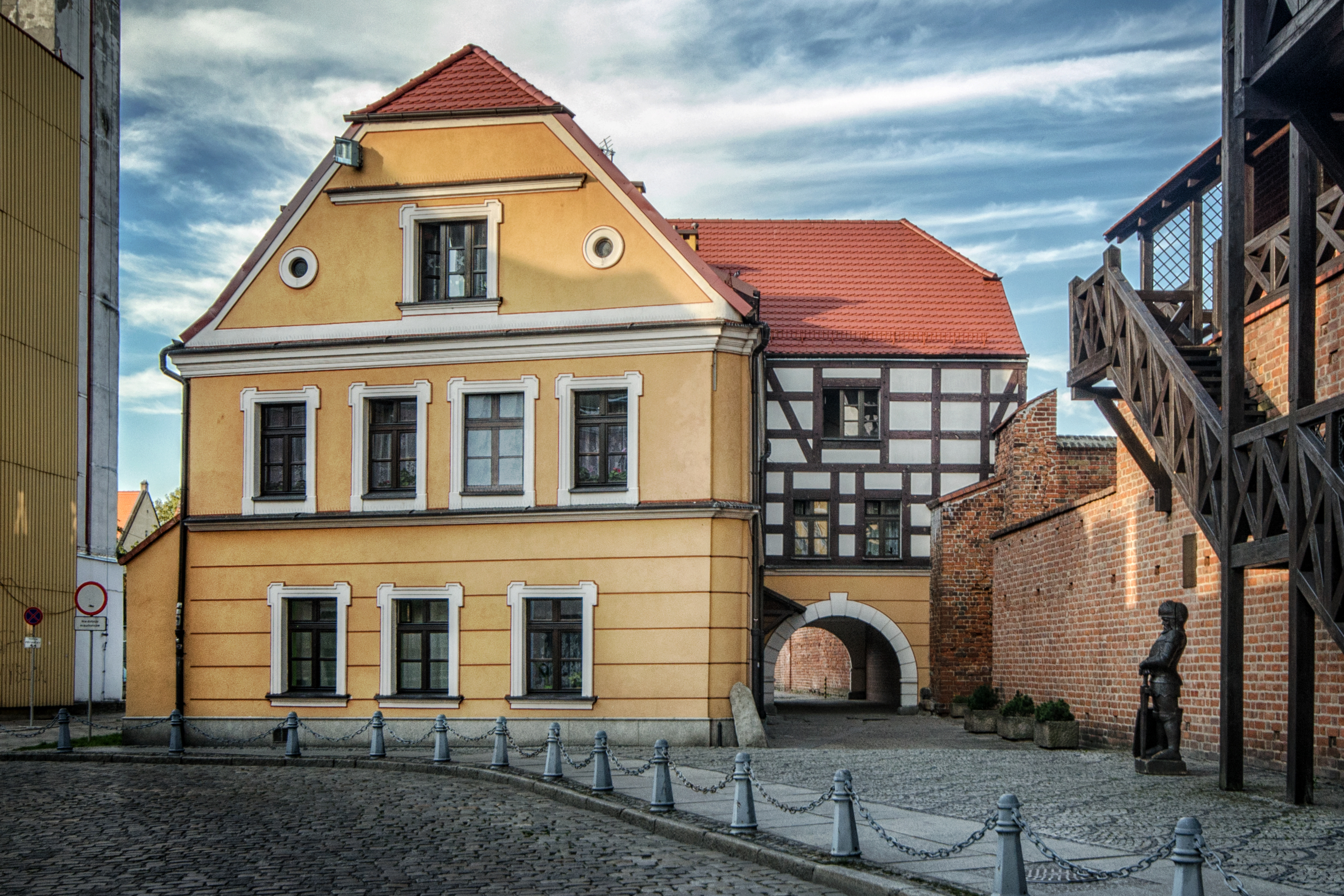
Historic houses

After a lengthy siege, the town was sacked by Swedish troops during the Thirty Years' War. In 1703 Leopold I, granted the castle to the Teutonic Knights, who subsequently created a commandery.

Namslau passed to the Kingdom of Prussia in the 1742 Treaty of Breslau (Wrocław). During the Seven Years' War, it was occupied by Austrian and Russian troops. The town was occupied by French troops from 1806–07 during the Napoleonic Wars; the castle was secularized in 1810. Namslau became part of the new Prussian Province of Silesia in 1815 and was administered within Kreis Namslau, Regierungsbezirk Breslau. The town became part of the German Empire in 1871 during the unification of Germany.

Namslau began to develop rapidly during the 19th century. The first newspaper within the town was founded in 1846, and Namslau was connected with Breslau by telegraph in 1862. It was connected by railway to Breslau and Kreuzburg (Kluczbork) by 1868 and to Oppeln (Opole) by 1899. One of the most well-known companies in the town was Brauerei Haselbach. In 1862 the brewer August Haselbach acquired the castle brewery, built in 1538; he purchased the castle in 1895. The industrial brewery was used as the model for other Haselbach breweries throughout Germany.

During World War II, Nazi Germany erected a subcamp of Gross-Rosen concentration camp near the town. During the war, the town was the local center of the Polish underground resistance movement and the Home Army operated there. On 21 January 1945 the town was conquered by the Red Army, leaving most of the buildings destroyed. In April it came under Polish administration and after the war was finally reintegrated with Poland, its historic Polish name was restored. In 1965 a monument of Jan Skala, Sorbian poet and activist for the rights of non-German minorities in interwar Germany, killed nearby by a Soviet soldier during the war, was unveiled in Namysłów. Reconstruction of the old town began after the war, but the Protestant church, completed in 1789, was leveled in 1963.

== Coat of arms ==
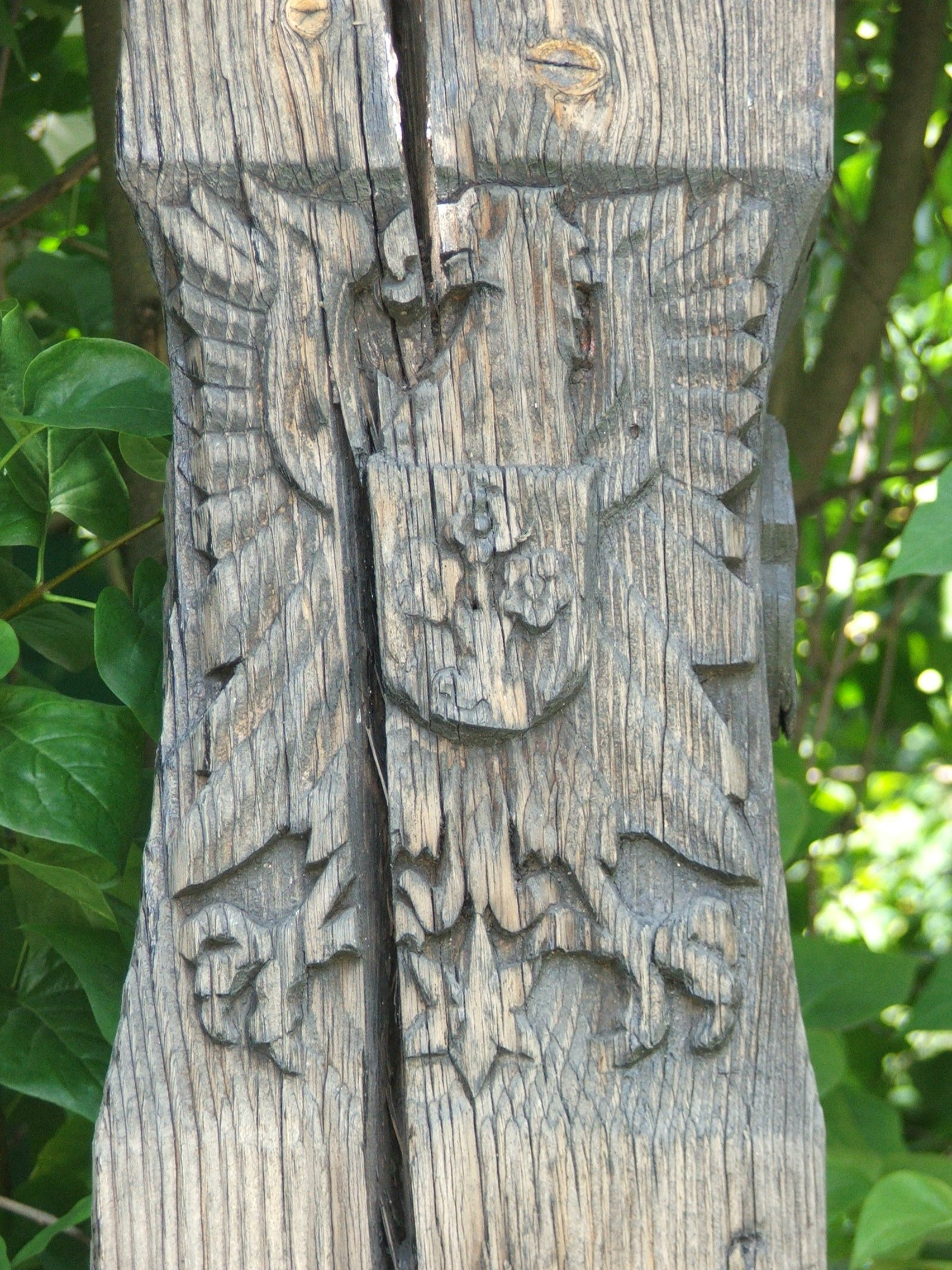
This wooden lamppost shows the older arms of Namysłów

The coat of arms of Namysłów depicted a black eagle on a yellow field, with an escutcheon of three red roses; the eagle's tail ended in a red star. These arms were similar to those now used by Namysłów County. With the town's transfer to Poland in 1945, its arms were changed to depict the top half of a Silesian eagle above a red star on a yellow field.

== Sights ==
Among the Medieval landmarks of Namysłów are:

- defensive town walls with the Krakowska Gate (Brama Krakowska) and numerous towers
- Saints Peter and Paul church built in years 1405–41 (Gothic)
- Saints Francis of Assisi and Peter of Alcantara church and the former Franciscan monastery, dating back to the 14th century (Gothic)
- Church of the Immaculate Conception of the Blessed Virgin Mary, dating back to the 13th century
- Namysłów Castle, dating back to the 14th century
- Town Hall at the Market Square

Other sights include the Park Północny (Northern Park), the old brewery, numerous historic townhouses and the monument of Sorbian poet Jan Skala.

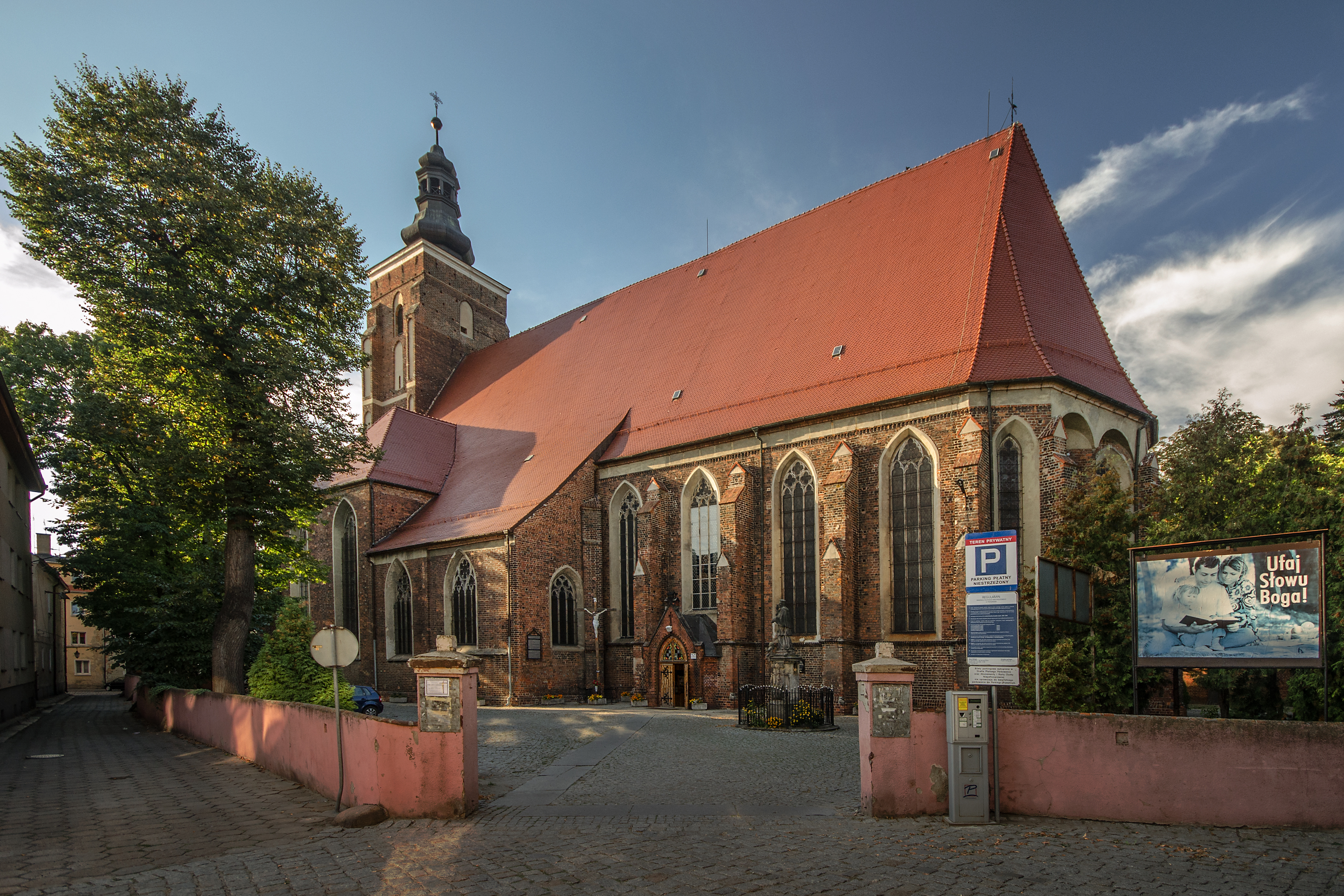
Saints Peter and Paul church

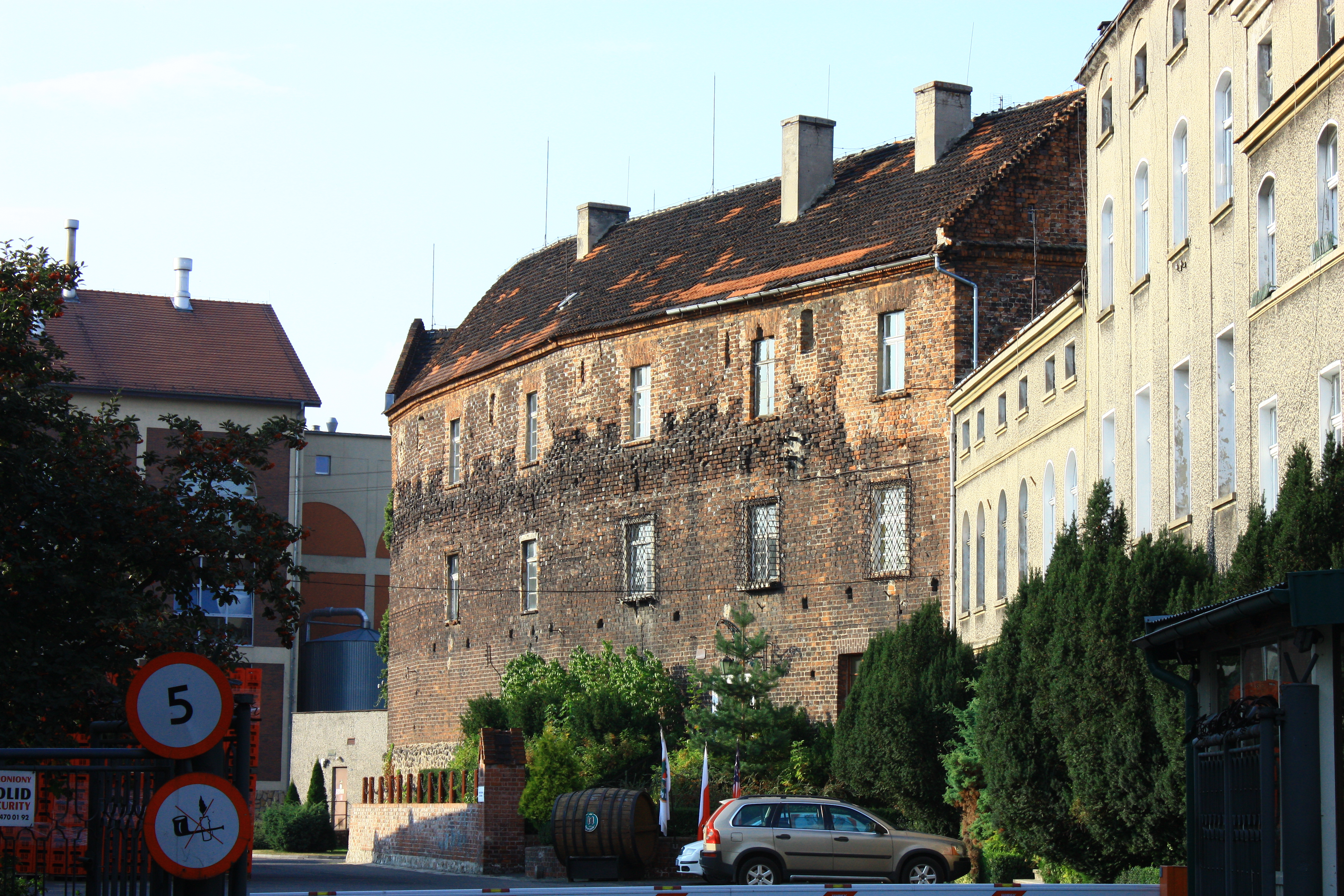
Namysłów Castle

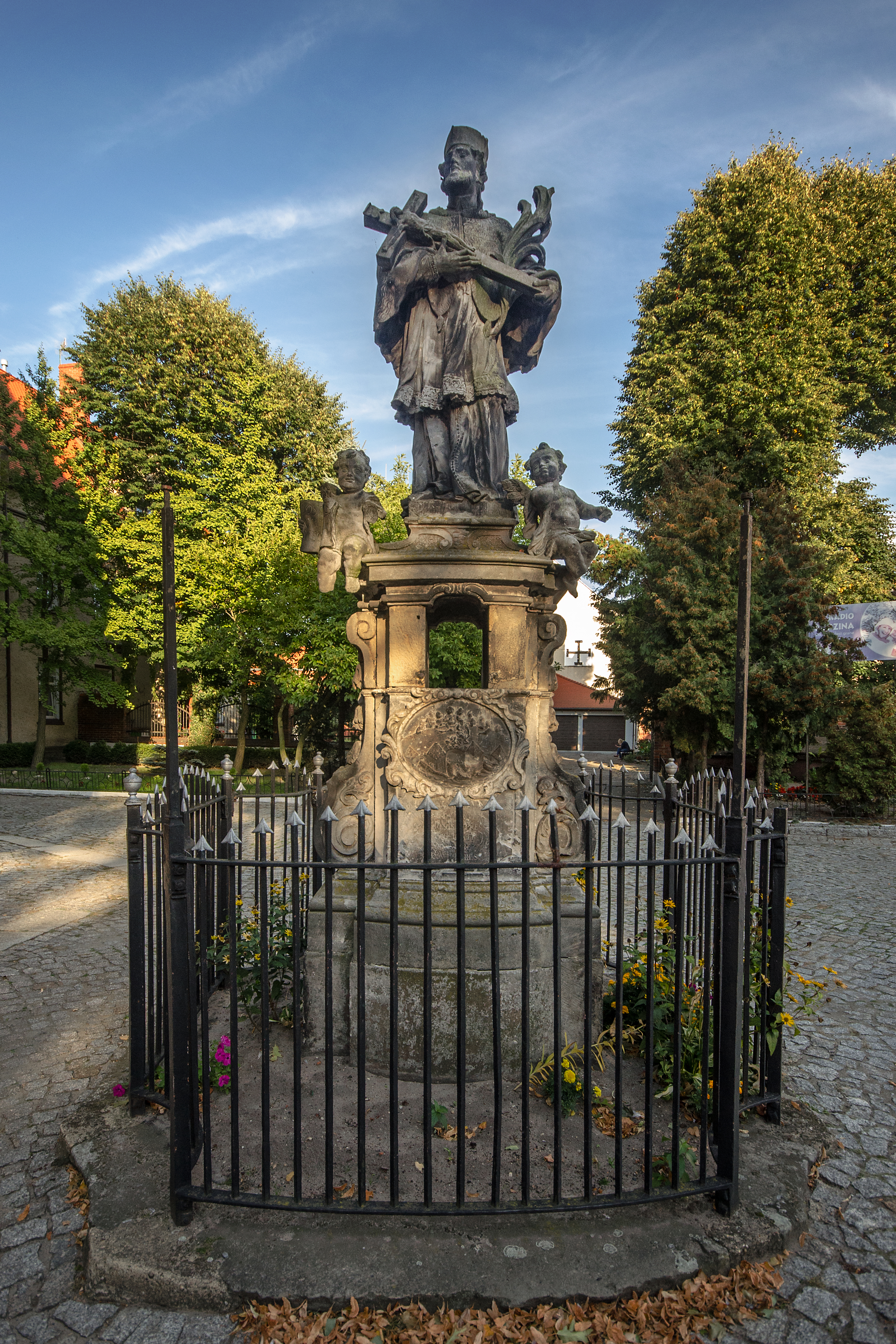
Baroque statue of John of Nepomuk

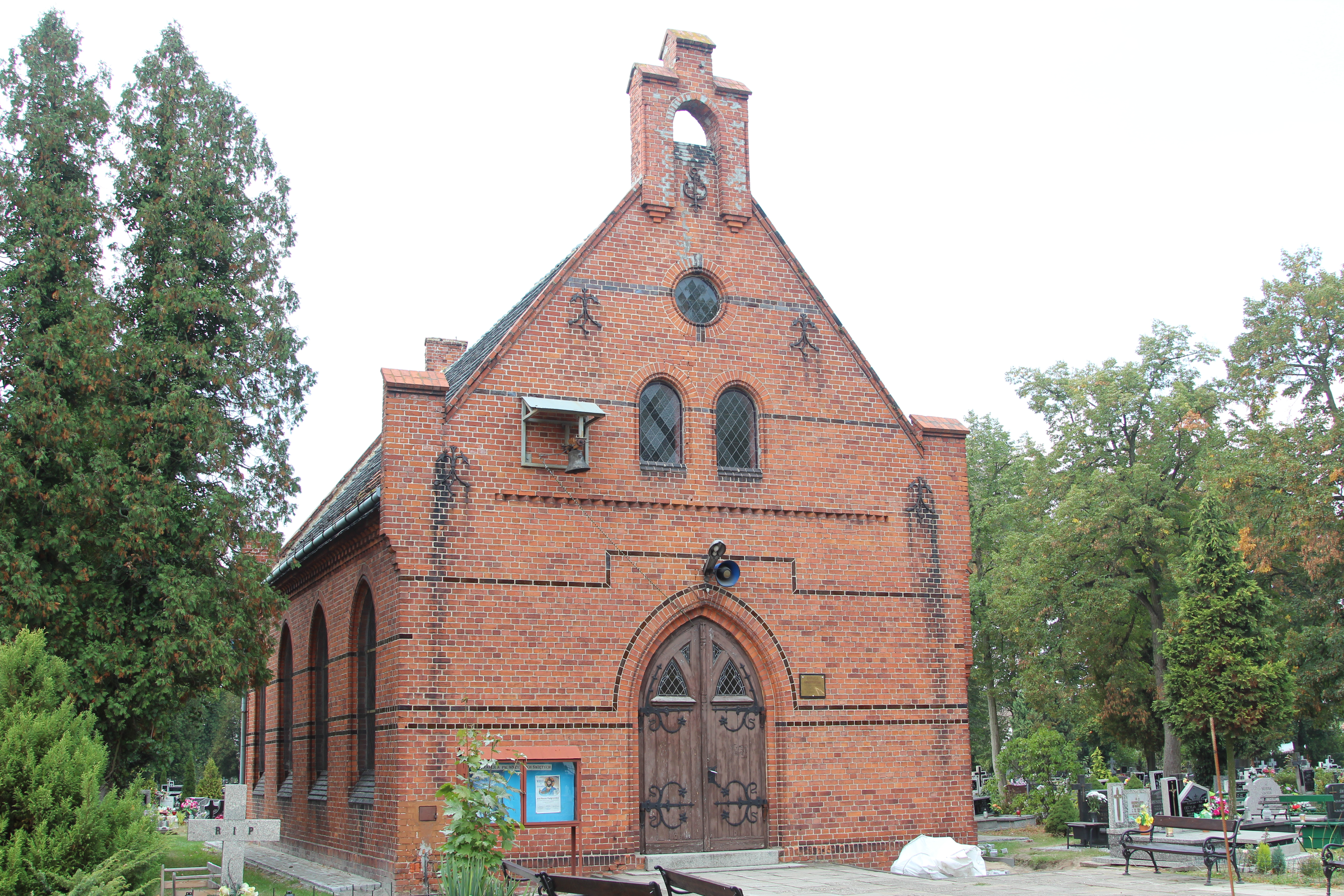
All Saints Chapel

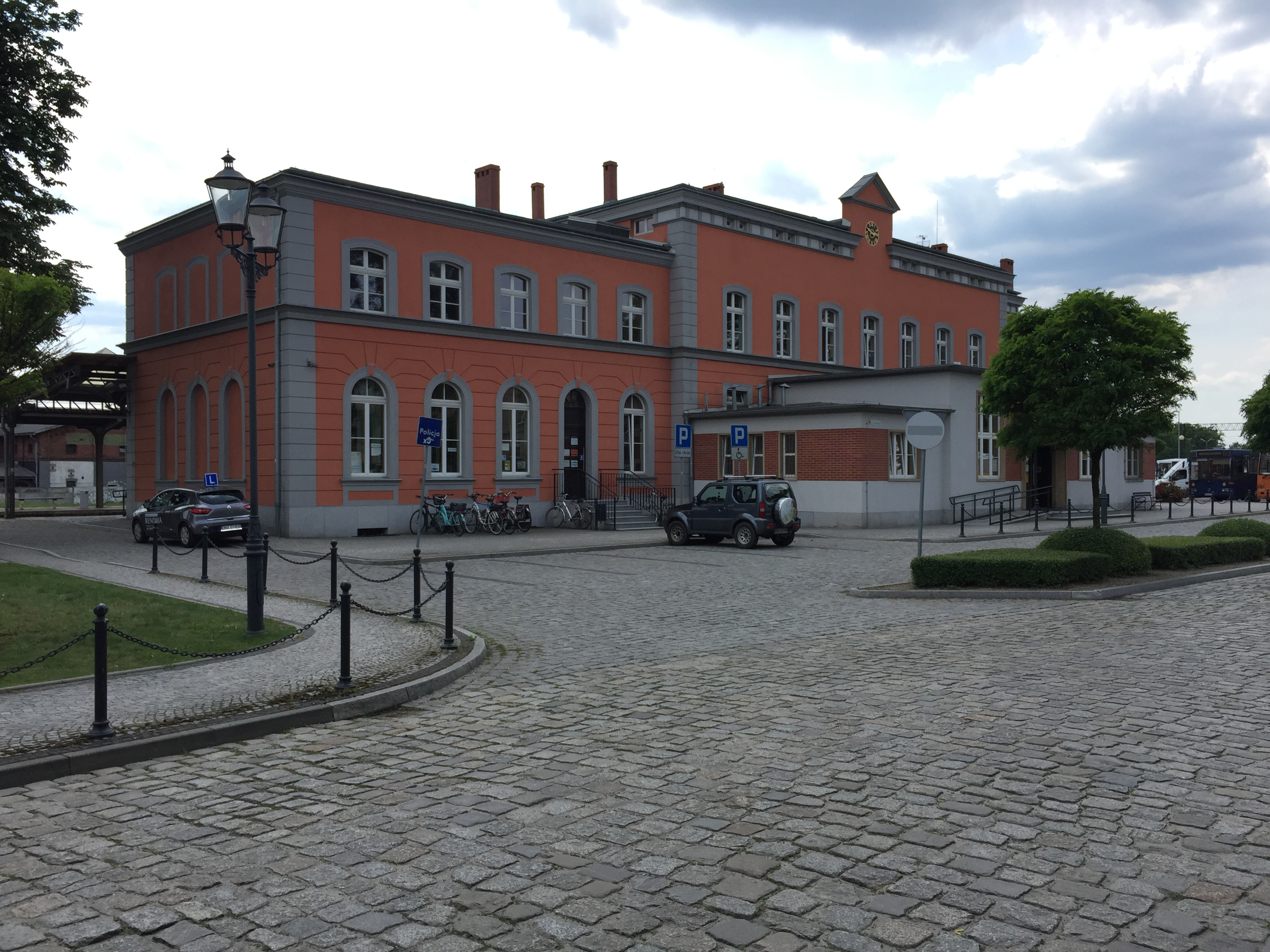
Railway station

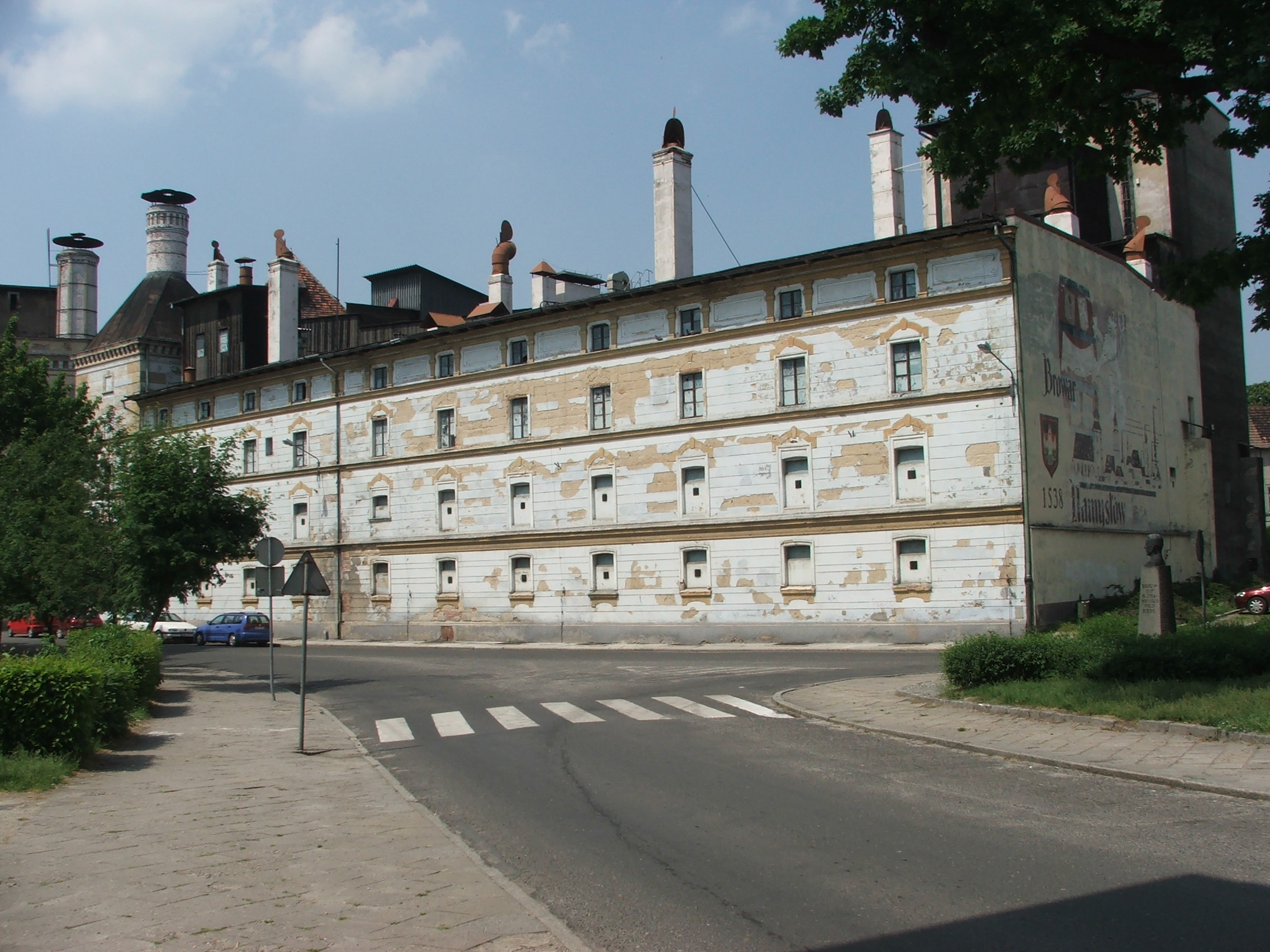
Namysłów Brewery

== Economy ==
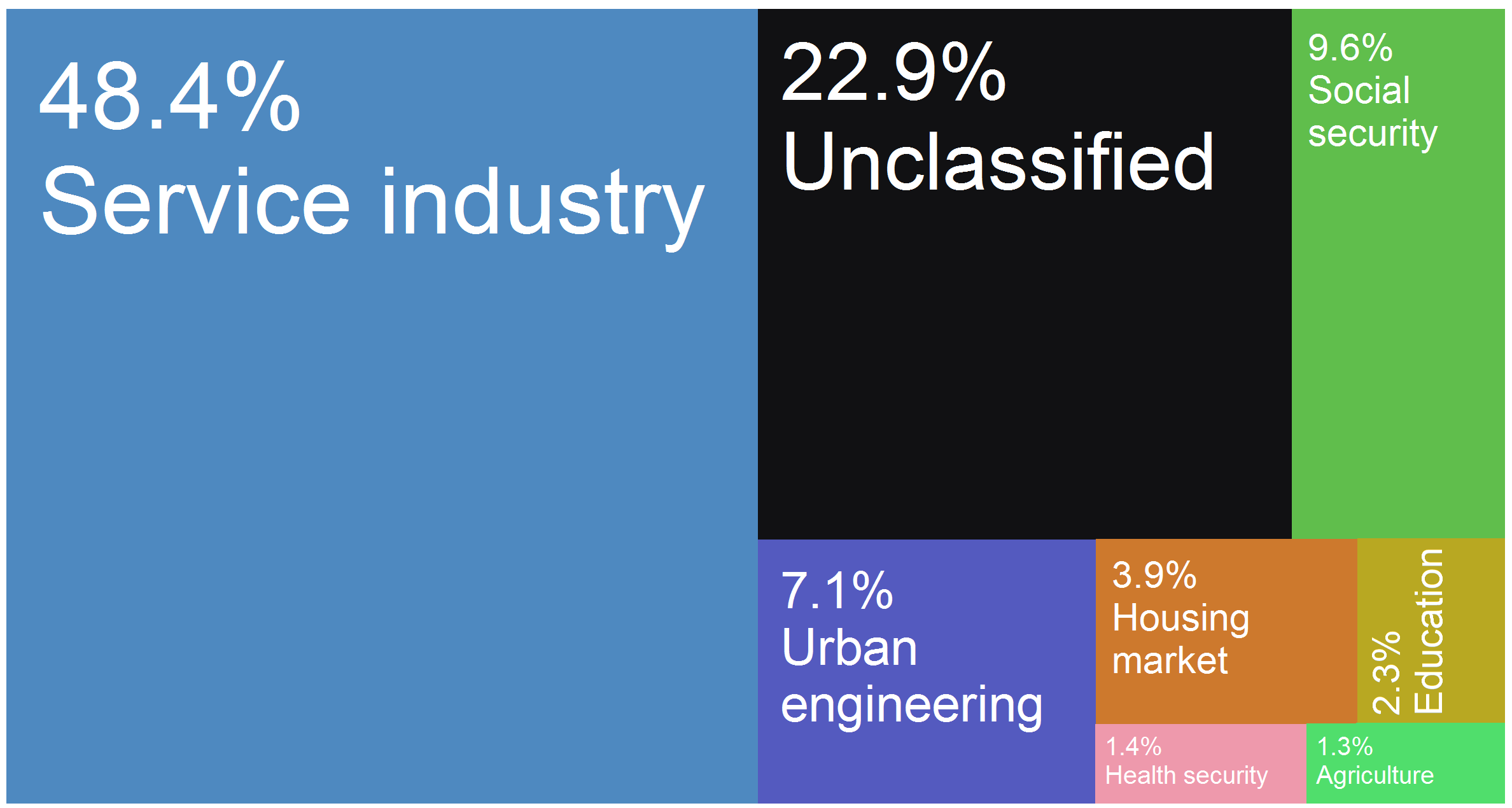
Namysłów city budget income sources as of 2015

The Namysłów Brewery (Browar Namysłów) is located in the town.

== Sports ==
The local football club is Start Namysłów. It competes in the lower leagues.

== Notable people ==
- Albert Bielschowsky (1847–1902), historian
- Alfred Bielschowsky (1871–1940), ophthalmologist
- Krystian Brzozowski (born 1982), sport wrestler
- Teresa Ceglecka-Zielonka (born 1957), politician
- Marta Chrust-Rożej (born 1978), Polish athlete
- Helmut Friebe (1894–1970), Wehrmacht general
- Werner Friebe (1897–1962), Wehrmacht general
- Angelika Jurkowianiec (born 1996), model
- Felix Liebrecht (1812–1890), folklorist
- Andrzej Markowiak (born 1951), politician
- Hubert Mordek (1939–2006), historian
- Franz Anton Morgenroth (1780-1847), composer
- Serafin Szota (born 1999), footballer
- Janusz Trzepizur (born 1959), high jumper

== Twin towns – sister cities ==
See twin towns of Gmina Namysłów.
