= Teresa Ceglecka-Zielonka =

Polish politician (born 1957)

Member of the Sejm
- In office 2005 – 2007

Personal details
- Born: 8 March 1957 (age 69) Namysłów, Polish People's Republic
- Party: Law and Justice

Teresa Zuzanna Ceglecka-Zielonka (born 8 March 1957 in Namysłów) is a Polish politician. She was elected to the Sejm on 25 September 2005, getting 5280 votes in 21 Opole district as a candidate from the Law and Justice list.

== See also ==
- Members of Polish Sejm 2005-2007
