= Namysłów Castle =

Castle in Namysłów, Poland

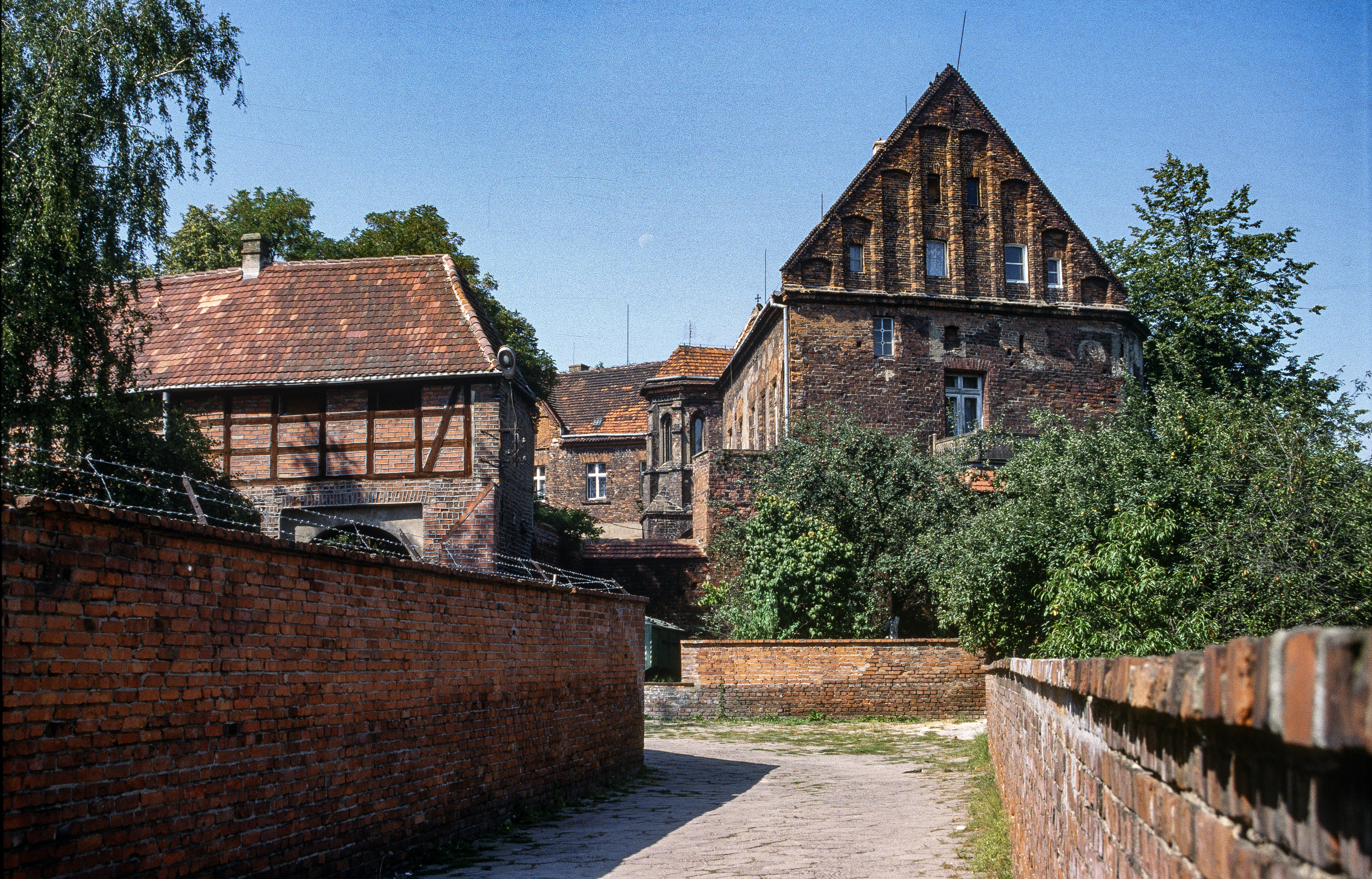
- Namysłów Castle

- Location of the Namysłów Castle in Poland Namysłów Castle (Opole Voivodeship)
- 51°04′N 17°42′E
- Location: Namysłów, Opole Voivodeship, in Poland

History
- Built: 1360

Site notes
- Architectural style: Gothic

Namysłów Castle - a castle located in Namysłów, Poland. The castle is raised on a mound, built from brick in an irregular rectangular shape. The castle is located in the centre of town beside the brewery.

== History ==
The first reliable document suggests the castle was built, from wood, in 1360. The order to build the castle was given by King of Bohemia and Holy Roman Emperor, Charles IV, in the location of a former gord of the Dukes of Oleśnica.

In 1533, the castle was transferred to the authorities of the city of Wrocław. Soon after the castle's courtyard was extended with additional housing units. In the seventeenth and eighteenth-century, the castle underwent further reconstruction, namely after the fire in 1658 and in 1741 after the castle was plundered by Prussia troops during the First Silesian War. In the late-nineteenth century, the castle became property of the Haselbach family who founded the Namysłów/Namslau Brewery. Presently, the castle remains property of the town brewery.
