= Duchy of Namysłów =

Former principality in Europe (1312–1358)

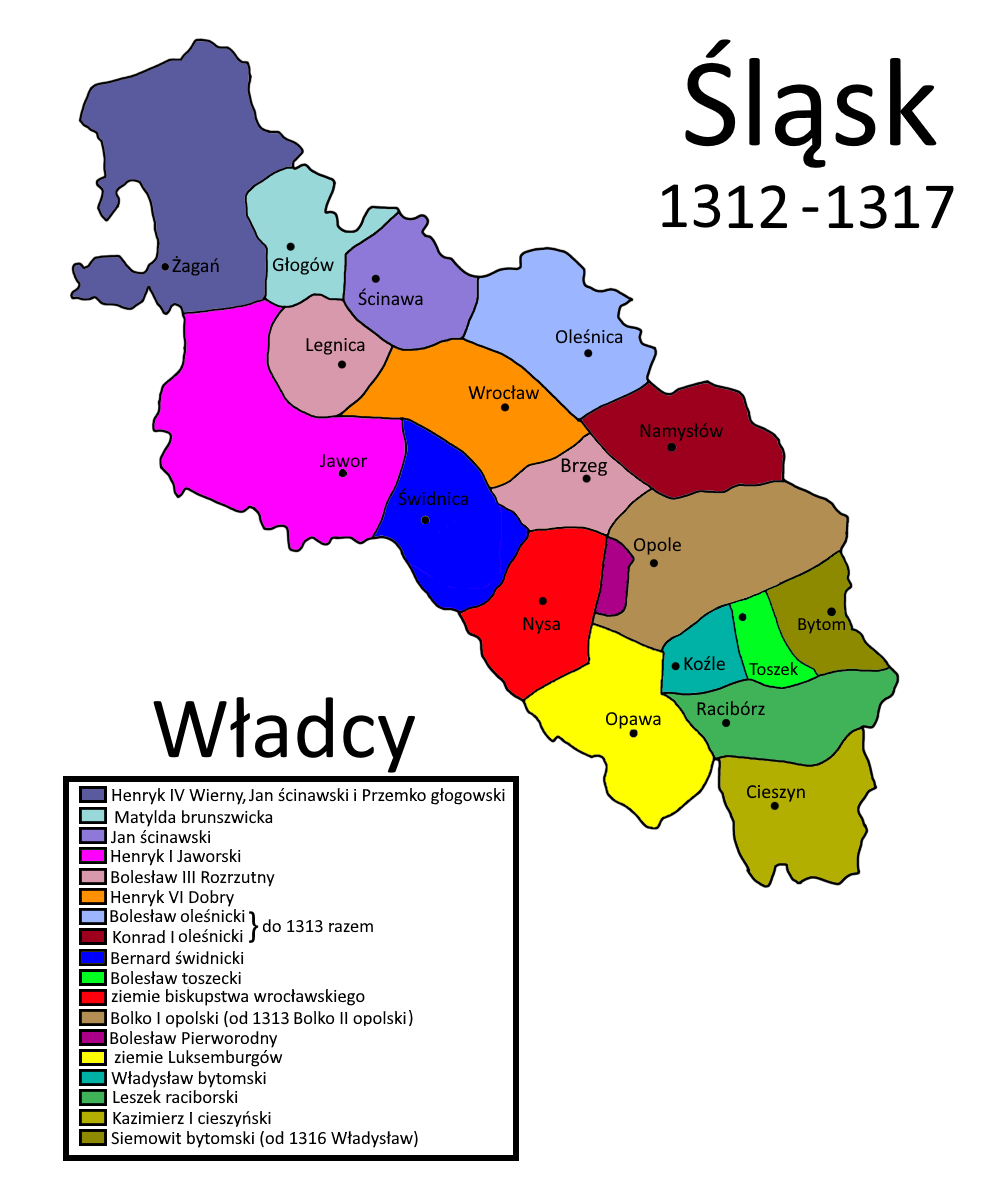
Silesian principalities, including the Principality of Namyslów

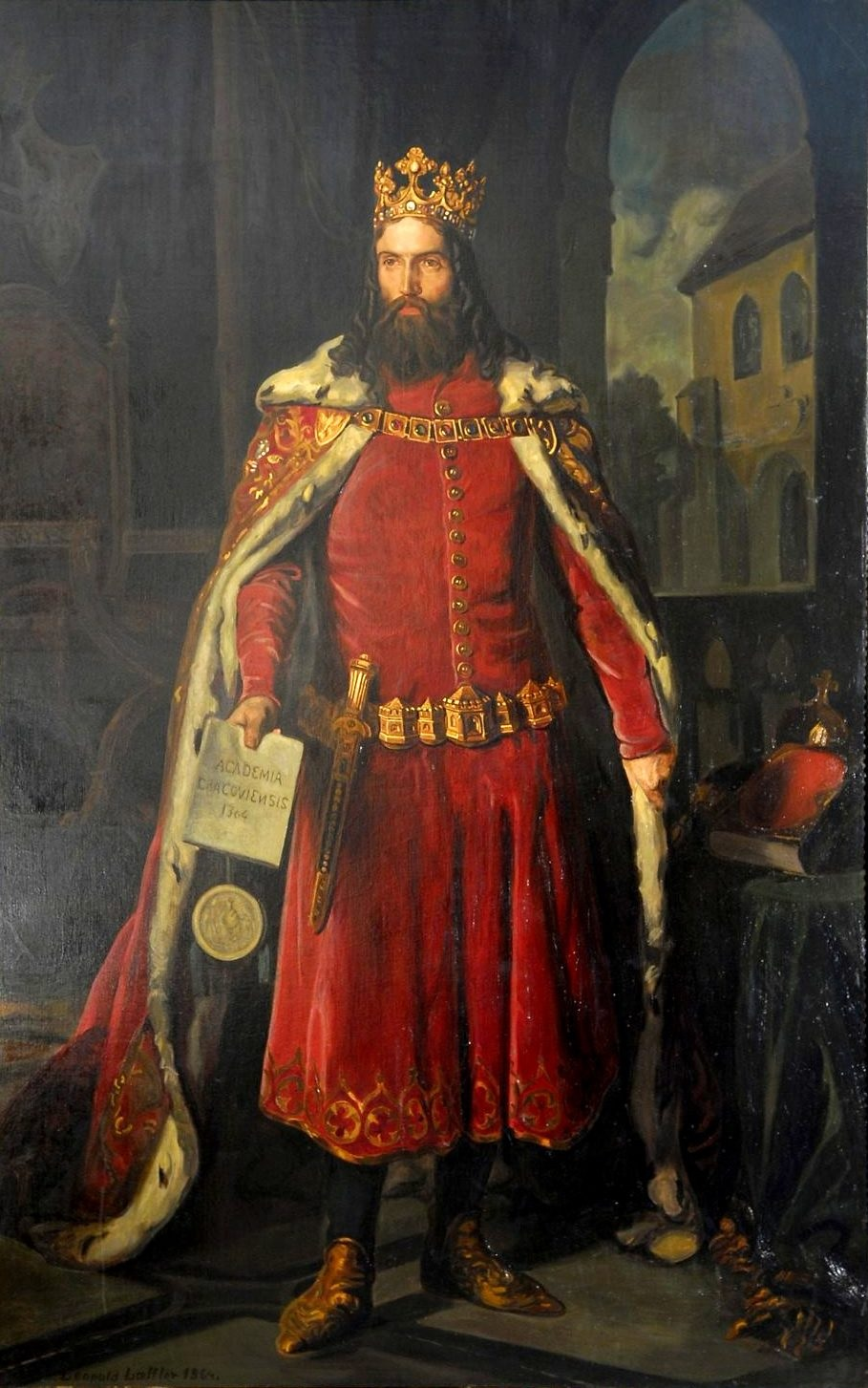
Casimir the Great on the picture

Duchy of Namysłów — principality created in 1312 after the division of the estate of Duke Henry III of Głogów, comprising Kalisz and Namysłów. In 1348, by the Treaty of Namyslow, it came under the sovereignty of Charles of Luxembourg and became part of the Czech crown in 1358.

== History ==
Between 1294 and 1309 Namysłów was part of the Duchy of Glogów. The independent Principality of Namysłów was established in 1312 after the division of the estate of Duke Henry III of Głogów. As a result of the division, princes Konrad I of the Oleśnica and Bolesław of Oleśnica received the eastern part of the estate, which included the cities of Oleśnica and Kluczbork, as well as the lands of Kalisz and Gniezno. The eldest of the brothers, Henry IV the Faithful, together with John and Przemyśl, took over the rule of Ścinawa, Żagań and Poznań.

In 1313, the duchy was divided into two parts: Conrad received Kalisz and Namyslow, and Boleslaw received Oleśnica and Gniezno. After the heirless death of Bolesław Oleśnicki in 1321, Conrad annexed the Duchy of Oleśnica, which met with resistance from the other Silesian dukes, supported by Władysław Łokietek.

Between 1321 and 1323 there were numerous invasions of the Duchy of Olesnica, ending with the Peace of Kraków in 1323. Conrad received Wołów, Lubiąż and Smogorzów, but had to give Namysłów, Byczyna and Kluczbork to Bolesław of Legnica. Bolesław III Generous ruled the Duchy of Namysłów until 1338, after which he handed it over to his son, Wacław I of Legnica. In 1342, due to debts, Boleslaw III handed over the Duchy of Legnica to his sons Wacław I and Louis I, and sold the rights to Namyslow to Casimir III the Great.
