= Marianne Angermann =

Spanish–New Zealand biochemist (1904–1977)

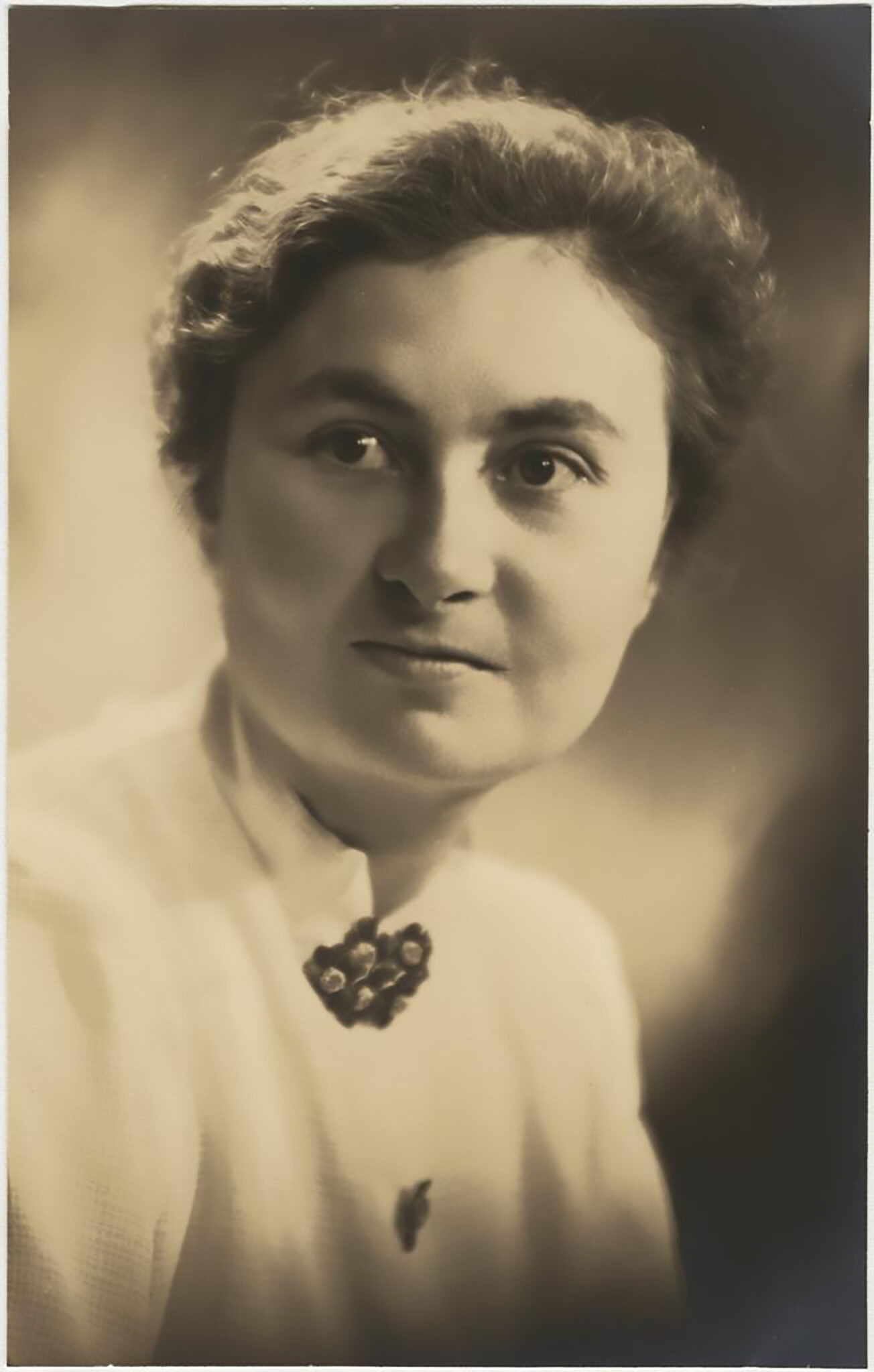
- Angermann in 1939
- Born: Mathilde Marianne Angermann; 30 June 1904; Dresden, Germany
- Died: 1977 (aged 72–73); Dunedin, New Zealand
- Occupation: Biochemist
- Spouse: Franz Bielschowsky (m. 1938; died 1965)
- Relatives: Max Bielschowsky (father-in-law)

Academic background
- Education: University of Greifswald; University of Freiburg; University of Cologne; University of Bonn

Academic work
- Institutions: Instituto de investigaciónes médicas, Madrid; University of Sheffield; University of Otago
- Notable works: Briefe einer Antifaschistin (1935–1939)

Signature
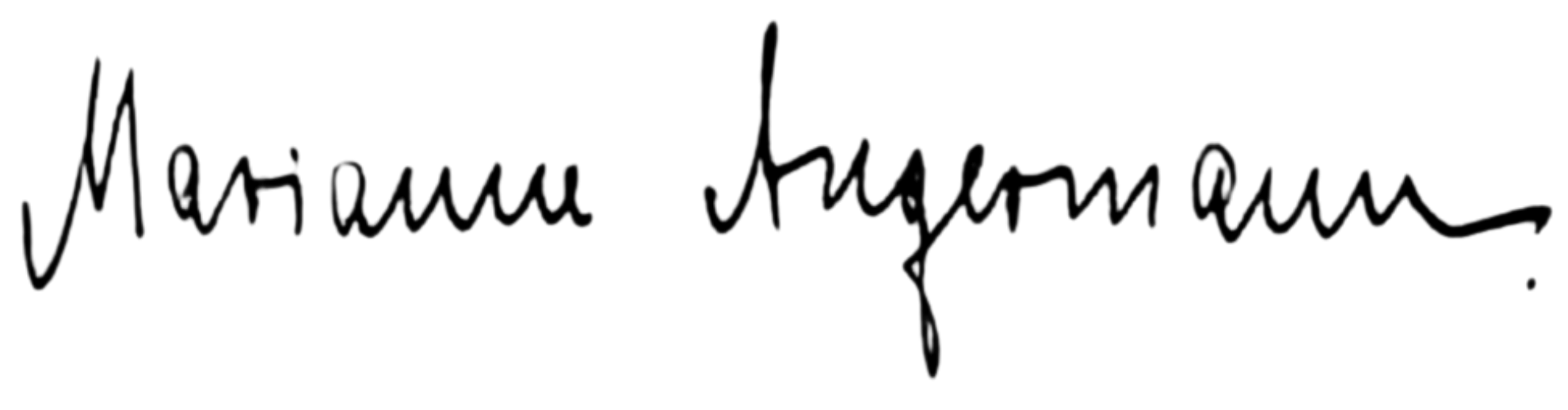

Mathilde Marianne Bielschowsky (née Angermann; 30 June 1904 – 1977) was a German-born Spanish–New Zealand biochemist and anti-fascist. Trained at the universities of Greifswald, Freiburg, Cologne, and Bonn, she earned a doctorate in chemistry in 1928 and later studied medicine. After leaving Germany in 1935 in opposition to the Nazi regime, she worked at the Instituto de investigaciónes médicas in Madrid, where she collaborated with fellow German emigrant Franz Bielschowsky. During the Spanish Civil War, Angermann volunteered as a medical laboratory chemist for the Republican forces while Bielschowsky served as a physician.

The couple married in Madrid in 1938 and, following the Republican defeat, fled to the United Kingdom, where they both worked at the University of Sheffield during the Second World War. In 1948 they emigrated to New Zealand, conducting cancer research at the University of Otago. Angermann developed a strain of New Zealand black mice used in laboratory studies, and her letters from Madrid between 1935 and 1939 were later published as Briefe einer Antifaschistin ('Letters of an Anti-Fascist').

== Early life ==
Mathilde Marianne Angermann was born on Stefanienstrasse, Dresden, Germany on 30 June 1904. The Angermanns were an established Saxon family. Her father, Konrad Theodor Konstantin Angermann (1874–1946), was a respected and well-educated jurist in the region, and her mother was Clara Clementine Charlotte Angermann (née Beutler; 1881–1958). In 1906, the family moved to Ilmenau, where Konrad became mayor. In 1911, the family moved to Langenberg. Konrad was mayor of the area from 1911 until 1936, his retirement.

== Education ==
Angermann took the university entrance diploma at Realgymnasium Langenberg in March 1922, achieving "very good" grades in mathematics and physics, and "good" grades in her other subjects, with the exception of religion. At the time, it was uncommon for women to proceed so far into their education. Angermann's diploma had to be manually adjusted to strike out male pronouns. Later in the year, she enrolled in the University of Greifswald. After 2 years, she enrolled in the University of Freiburg and completed a doctorate in chemistry. She graduated in July 1928, and soon worked as an assistant for physician Siegfried Loew-Thannhauser.

She first met her future husband Franz Bielschowsky while working for Loew-Thannhauser. By May 1931, she enrolled in the University of Cologne, taking microscopy and botany courses. During this period, she was briefly married. Although her husband's identity is not definitively known, it was speculated to be Werner Siefken, a fellow student at Freiburg, due to her taking on his last name. The marriage did not last, and by 1932, she had gone back to using her maiden name. The same year, she co-authored a publication in Hoppe-Seyler's Zeitschrift für physiologische Chemie ('Hoppe-Seyler's Journal for Physiological Chemistry'), in which Bielschowsky was also credited. She also transferred to the University of Bonn and enrolled in the medical faculty. In the university, she studied under anatomist Johannes Sobotta, zoologist August Reichensperger, and physiologist Julius Ulrich Ebbecke.

== Work in Spain and the Spanish Civil War ==
On 7 April 1933, the Law for the Restoration of the Professional Civil Service was passed, calling for the resignation of all "non-Aryan" civil servants. This affected several of Angermann's colleagues and professors, including Bielschowsky. Angermann suffered from "dreadful loneliness" in Berlin, and made the decision to move to Spain in 1935. Although not Jewish, she opposed the Nazi regime and chose exile from Germany. She was a devout anti-fascist. Angermann's anti-fascist letters from Madrid between 1935 and 1939, preserved by her family and later transcribed and translated by staff at the University of Otago, were published online as Briefe einer Antifaschistin ('Letters of an Anti-Fascist'). In late 1935, she moved to Spain to join the Instituto de investigaciónes médicas in Madrid, directed by Carlos Jiménez Díaz. She helped plan the logistics in setting up a new chemistry laboratory in the University. Bielschowsky commented that she looked "much better" since arriving in Spain, previously looking "half dead". There she worked with Bielschowsky, who had fled Germany in 1933 due to anti-Jewish legislation. Angermann found temporary residence in Plaza de las Cortes, later moving into an apartment in Calle Francisco de Rojas.

In her letters home, Angermann described her excitement at the modern laboratories of the institute and her growing attachment to life in Madrid. She learned Spanish and immersed herself in the culture of the Spanish Second Republic. When the Spanish Civil War broke out in July 1936, Angermann and Bielschowsky remained in Madrid while many of their colleagues relocated to Valencia. Both volunteered for the Republican war effort, working at a military hospital in Chamartín de la Rosa. Angermann served as a medical laboratory chemist, while Bielschowsky was a physician with the Republican Army's medical service.

The couple married in Madrid on 12 July 1938, with Angermann taking his surname. Through the marriage, Angermann became the daughter-in-law of Max Bielschowsky, a German neuropathologist. Following the Republican defeat in early 1939, Angermann and Bielschowsky obtained Spanish passports and fled to Marseille. They subsequently secured entry to the United Kingdom.

== Scientific career in Britain and New Zealand ==
Angermann and her husband both worked at the University of Sheffield during the Second World War. In 1948, they emigrated to New Zealand after Bielschowsky was appointed director of the Cancer Research Laboratory at the University of Otago. The couple carried out cancer research there and remained in New Zealand for the rest of their lives. In 1960, they became the first international visitors of the Cancer Congress held in Melbourne, Australia.

Angermann developed a strain of New Zealand black mice in Dunedin through inbreeding. The strain, developed in the Cancer Research Laboratory in the University of Otago, found the presence of hemolytic anemia in mice. She lived in Dunedin from her arrival to the country until her death in 1977. Her husband died in 1965.
