= Axial skeleton =

Bones of the head and trunk of a vertebrate

- Diagram of the axial skeleton

Details

Identifiers
- Latin: skeleton axiale
- TA98: A02.0.00.009
- TA2: 353

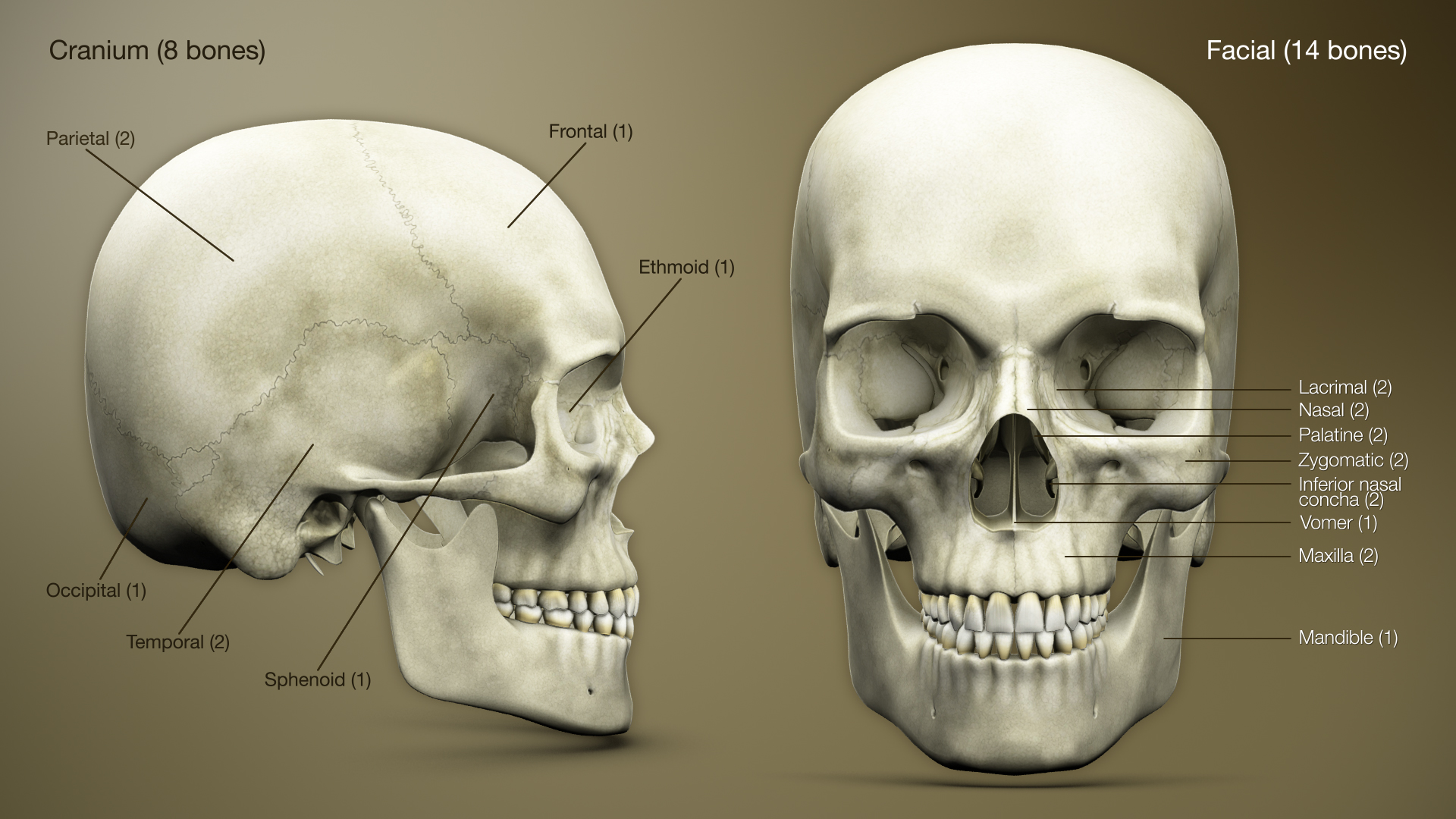
3D medical animation still shot of human skull

The axial skeleton is the core part of the endoskeleton made of the bones of the head and trunk of vertebrates. In the human skeleton, it consists of 80 bones and is composed of the skull (28 bones, including the cranium, mandible and the middle ear ossicles), the vertebral column (26 bones, including vertebrae, sacrum and coccyx), the rib cage (25 bones, including ribs and sternum), and the hyoid bone. The axial skeleton is joined to the appendicular skeleton (which support the limbs) via the shoulder girdles and the pelvis.

== Structure ==
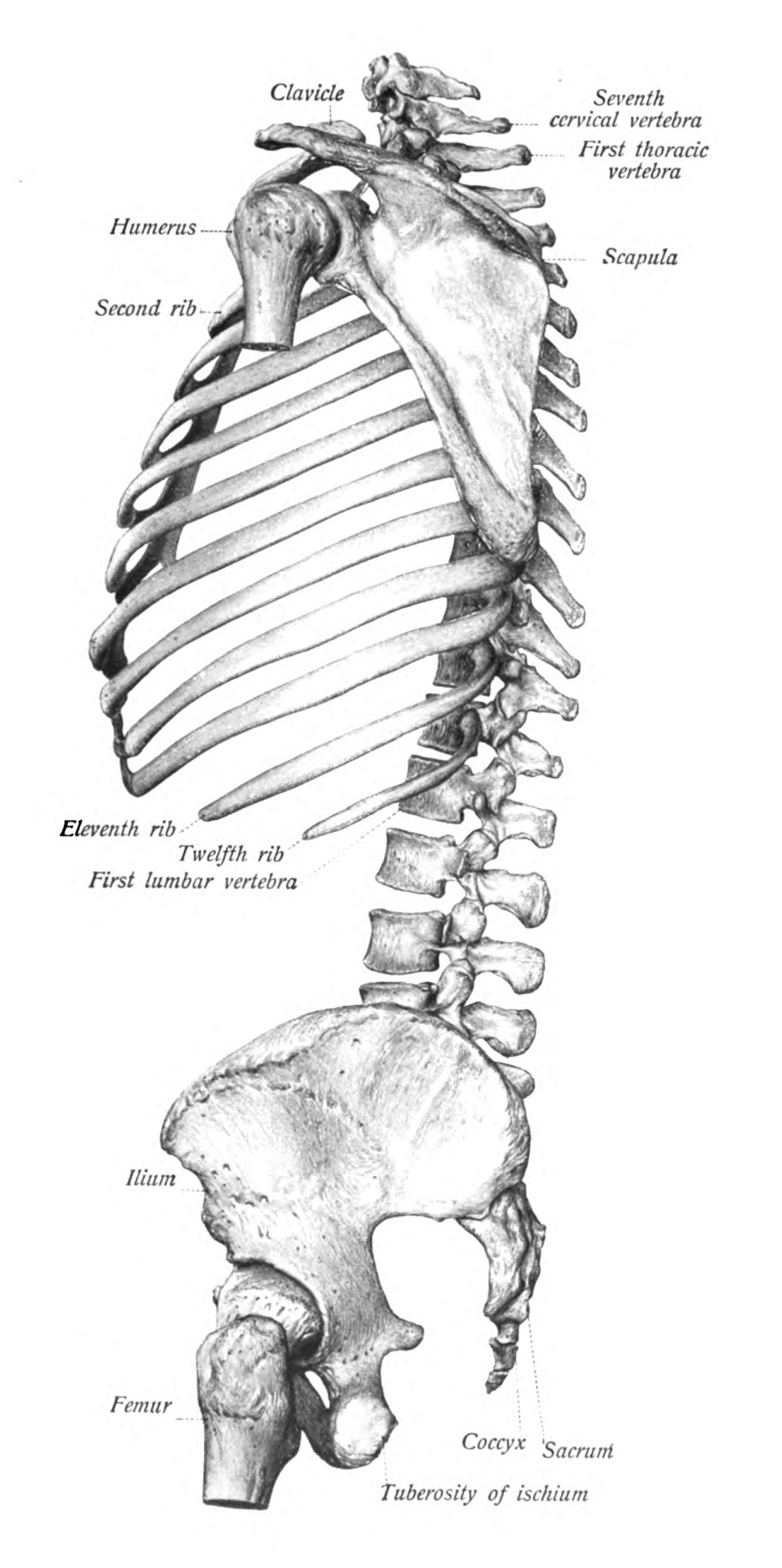
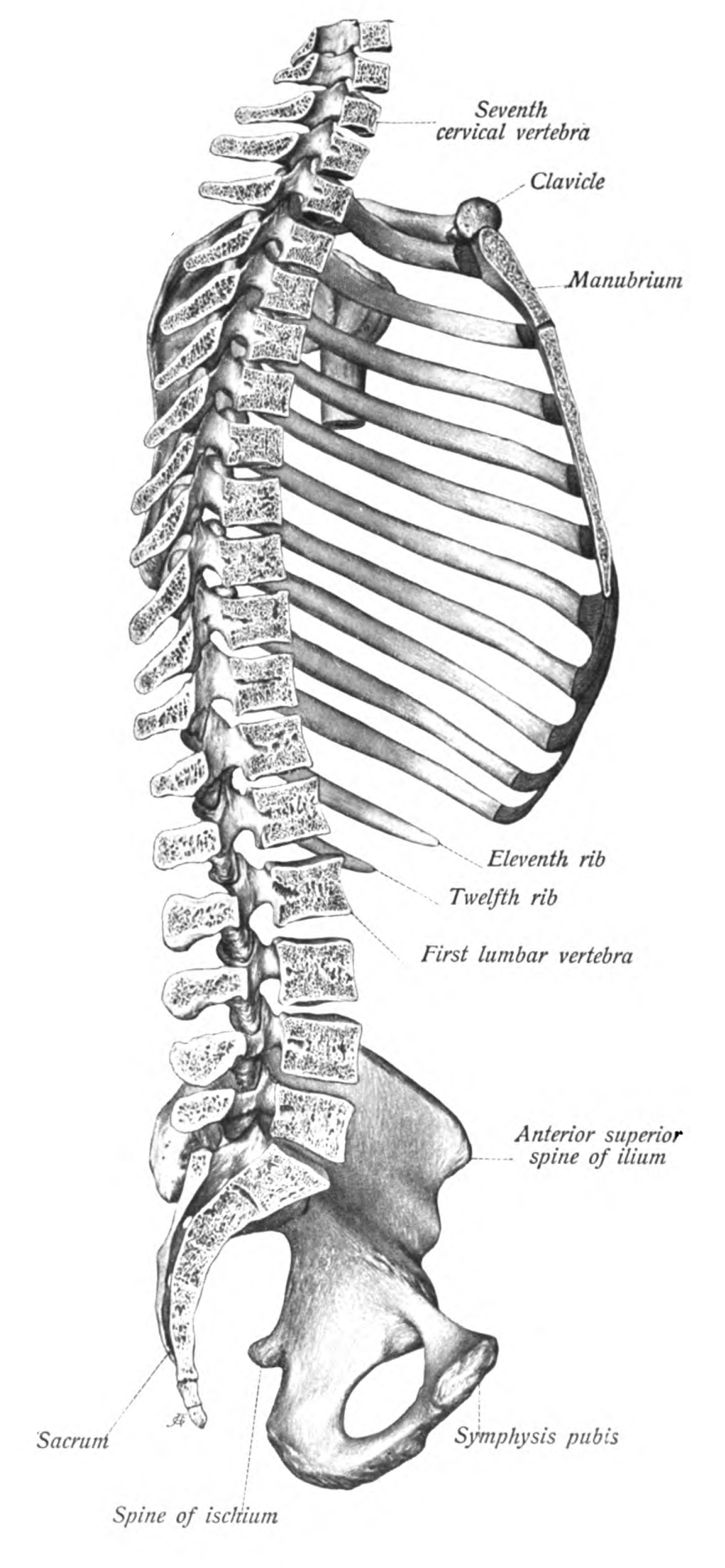
View from both directions of an axial skeleton cut in half. Shows attachments to pelvis and does not show skull. From Sobotta's atlas of human anatomy 1909.

Flat bones house the brain and other vital organs. This article mainly deals with the axial skeletons of humans; however, it is important to understand its evolutionary lineage. The human axial skeleton consists of 81 different bones forming the medial core of the body and connects the pelvis to the body, where the appendicular skeleton attaches. As the skeleton grows older the bones get weaker with the exception of the skull. The skull remains strong to protect the brain from injury.

In humans, the axial skeleton serves to protect the brain, spinal cord, heart, and lungs. It also serves as the attachment site for muscles that move the head, neck, and back, and for muscles that act across the shoulder and hip joints to move their corresponding limbs.

=== Human skull ===
The human skull consists of the cranium and the facial bones. The cranium holds and protects the brain in a large space called the cranial vault. The cranium is formed from eight plate-shaped bones which fit together at meeting points (joints) called sutures. In addition there are 14 facial bones which form the lower front part of the skull. Together the 22 bones that compose the skull form additional, smaller spaces besides the cranial vault, such as the cavities for the eyes, the internal ear, the nose, and the mouth. The most important facial bones include the jaw or mandible, the upper jaw or maxilla, the zygomatic or cheek bone, and the nasal bone.

Humans are born with separate plates which later fuse to allow flexibility as the skull passes through the pelvis and birth canal during birth. During development the eight separate plates of the immature bones fuse into one single structure known as the skull. The only bone that remains separate from the rest of the skull is the mandible.

=== Rib cage ===
The rib cages are composed of 12 pairs of ribs plus the sternum for a total of 25 separate bones. The rib cage functions as protection for the vital organs such as the heart and lungs. The ribs are shaped like crescents, with one end flattened and the other end rounded. The rounded ends are attached at joints to the thoracic vertebrae at the back and the flattened ends come together at the sternum, in the front.

The upper seven pairs of ribs attach to the sternum with costal cartilage and are known as "true ribs". The 8th through 10th ribs have non-costal cartilage which connects them to the ribs above, and for this they are known as "false ribs". The last two ribs are called "floating ribs" because they do not attach to the sternum or to other ribs and simply "hang free". The length of each rib increases from number one to seven and then decreases until rib pair number 12. The first rib is the shortest, broadest, flattest, and most curved.

=== Vertebral column ===
At birth the majority of humans have 33 separate vertebrae. However, during normal development several vertebrae fuse, leaving a total of 24, in most cases. The confusion about whether or not there are 32–34 vertebrae stems from the fact that the two lowest vertebrae, the sacrum and the coccyx, are single bones made up of several smaller bones which have fused together. This is how the vertebrae are counted: 24 separate vertebrae and the sacrum, formed from 5 fused vertebrae, and the coccyx, formed from 3–5 fused vertebrae. If you count the coccyx and sacrum each as one vertebra, then there are 26 vertebrae. If the fused vertebrae are all counted separately, then the total number of vertebrae comes to between 32 and 34 (due to the number making up the coccyx varying between 3 and 5).

The vertebral column consists of 5 parts. The most cranial (uppermost) part is made up by the cervical vertebrae (7), followed by thoracic vertebrae (12), lumbar (5), sacral (5) and coccygeal vertebrae (3–5).

Cervical vertebrae make up the junction between the vertebral column and the cranium. Sacral and coccygeal vertebrae are fused and thus often called "sacral bone" or "coccygeal bone" as unit. The sacral bone makes up the junction between the vertebral column and the pelvic bones.

== Etymology ==
The word "axial" is taken from the word "axis" and refers to the fact that the bones are located close to or along the central "axis" of the body. The term axis means the central point around which the other structures are distributed.

== Short summary ==
The axial skeleton consists of 80 bones:

- The skull, which contains 22 bones, from which 8 are cranial and 14 are facial,
- 6 middle ear ossicles (3 in each ear),
- 1 hyoid bone in the neck,
- 26 bones of vertebral column,
- 1 chest bone (sternum), and
- 24 ribs (12 pairs).

== See also ==
- Appendicular skeleton
- Skull
- Hyoid bone
- Sternum
- Ribs
