= Andrzej Markowiak =

Polish politician

member of Sejm 2005-2007
- In office 25 September 2005 – 2007

Personal details
- Born: 27 March 1951 (age 75) Namysłów
- Party: Civic Platform

Andrzej Markowiak (born 27 March 1951) is a Polish politician and a member of Sejm 2001-2005.

== See also ==
- Members of Polish Sejm 2005-2007
