= Theobald Ziegler =

German philosopher and educator (1846–1918)

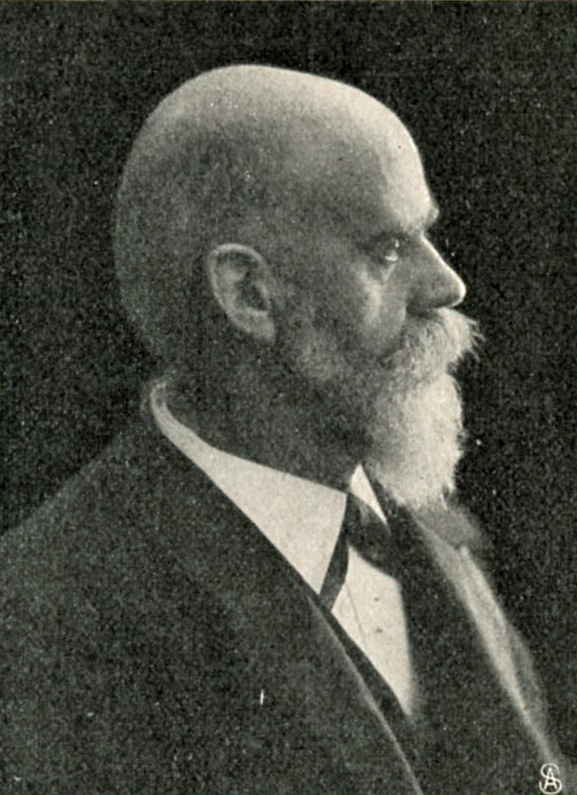
Theobald Ziegler

Theobald Ziegler (9 February 1846 – 1 September 1918) was a German philosopher and educator, born in Göppingen, Württemberg.

== Career ==
Ziegler studied theology and philosophy at the University of Tübingen, and later was a secondary school teacher in Heilbronn, Winterthur and Baden-Baden. During this time period he also taught classes at Tübinger Stift. In 1882 he became konrektor of a Protestant secondary school in Strasbourg, followed by an appointment as professor of philosophy at the University of Strasbourg (1886).

Ziegler taught Albert Schweitzer, and is mentioned in Schweitzer's autobiography Out of my Life and Thought. Ziegler died in Sierentz, Alsace–Lorraine.

== Published works ==
Among his literary efforts was a biography of David Friedrich Strauss, and a 1900 publication on Friedrich Nietzsche that was based on lectures Ziegler gave in 1897–98. Other significant writings by Ziegler include:

- Geschichte der christlichen Ethik, 1896 - History of Christian ethics.
- Sittliches Sein und sittliches Werden: Grundlinien eines Systems der Ethik, 1890 - Moral and ethical will; baseline of a system of ethics.
- Religion und Religionen, 1893 - Religion and religions.
- Geschichte der Pädagogik, 1895 - History of education.
- Die geistigen und socialen strömungen des neunzehnten jahrhunderts, 1899 - The intellectual and social currents of the 19th century.

Today, in Frankfurt am Main, the "Theobald-Ziegler-Schule" (primary school) is named in his honor.
