= Giovanni Battista Polledro =

Italian violinist and composer

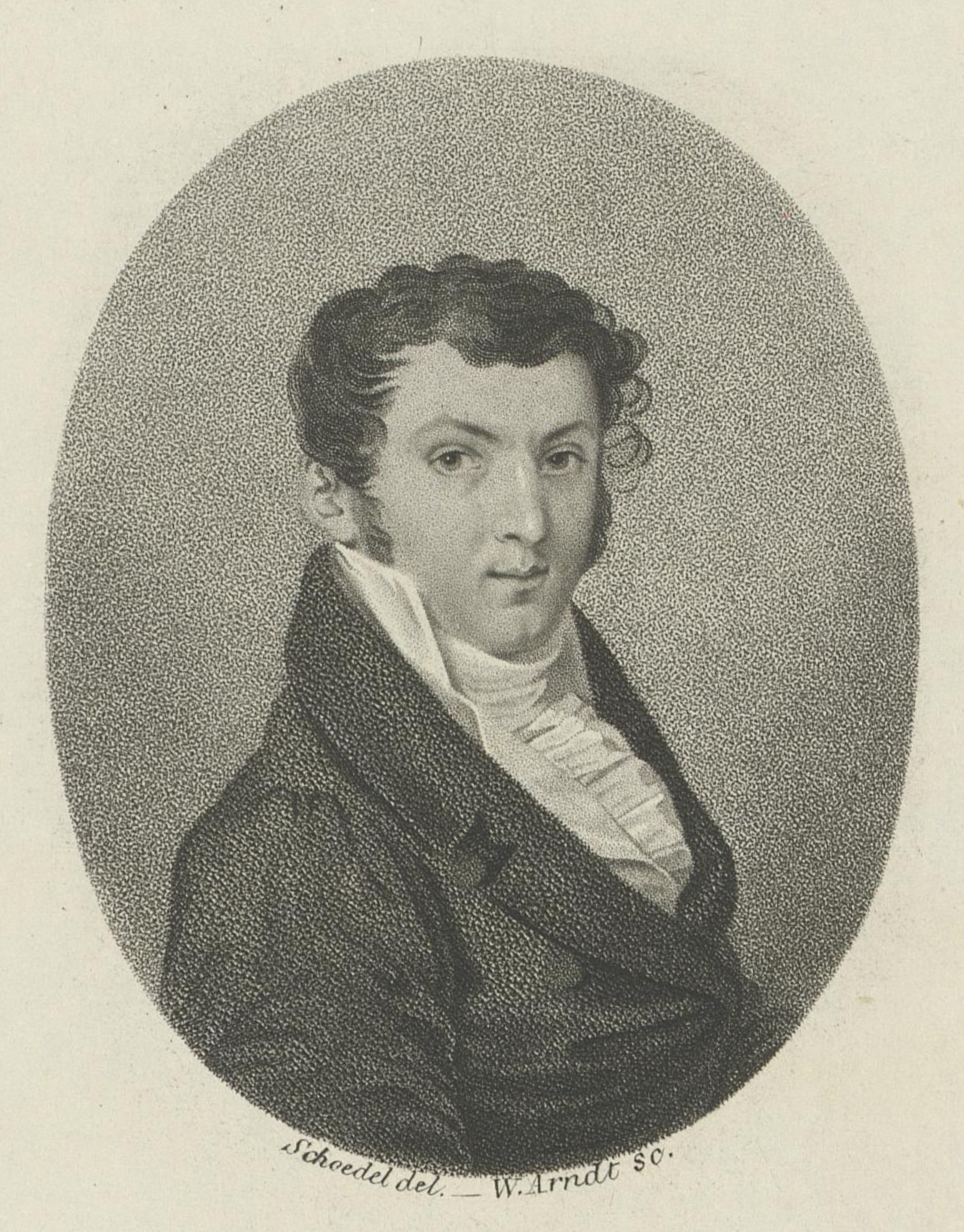

Giovanni Battista Polledro (10 June 1781 – 15 August 1853) was an Italian violinist and composer.

== Life ==
Polledro was born in Piovà near Turin, son of a merchant. Showing musical talent at an early age, he studied with local musicians, and at age fifteen he was a pupil of Gaetano Pugnani for six months, afterwards joining the court orchestra of Turin. In 1804 he was in the theatre orchestra in Bergamo; soon afterwards he began to tour, and for five years he lived in Moscow, engaged with Count Alexander Ivanovich Tatischev. In August 1812 he met Ludwig van Beethoven at Carlsbad, and they gave there a concert for the benefit of the victims of a fire in Baden bei Wien.

In 1816 he became concertmaster of the court orchestra in Dresden. He was engaged in 1822 as director of the court orchestra in Turin. From 1845 he suffered from ill health; he died in Piovà in 1853.

His biographer in A Dictionary of Music and Musicians (1900) wrote: "Polledro was an excellent violinist and sound musician. He had the great tone and dignified style of the classical Italian school. All contemporaneous critics praise his faultless and brilliant execution not less than the deep feeling with which he played."

== Compositions ==
Compositions include three concertos, some airs variés, trios and duos for stringed instruments, and a set of exercises for the violin; a Miserere and a Mass for voices and orchestra, and a Sinfonia pastorale for full orchestra.
