= Albert Bielschowsky =

German literary historian (1847–1902)

Albert Bielschowsky ([bi:lšofski]; 3 January 1847 – 21 October 1902) was a German literary historian (Literaturwissenschaftler). He is known for his writings concerning Johann Wolfgang von Goethe.

Bielschowsky was born in Namslau (Namysłów), Prussian Silesia, into a family of Jewish merchants. He studied philology in Breslau (Wrocław) and Berlin. Because Bielschowsky's work on Goethe was cut short by his death in Berlin, the series was completed by Theobald Ziegler.

== Literary works ==
- Goethe. Sein Leben und seine Werke, 2 vols. Munich: C. H. Beck'sche Verlagsbuchhandlung. 1895–1903 (numerous printings).
- The Life Of Goethe: 1749–1788, From Birth To The Return From Italy
- The Life of Goethe: 1788–1815, from the Italian Journey to the Wars of Liberation
- The Life of Goethe: 1815–1832, from the Congress of Vienna to the Poet's Death
