= Johannes Sobotta =

German anatomist (1869–1945)

- Born: 31 January 1869; Berlin
- Died: 20 April 1945 (aged 76); Bonn
- Known for: Sobotta atlas of human anatomy
- Scientific career
- Fields: Anatomy

Robert Heinrich Johannes Sobotta (31 January 1869 in Berlin – 20 April 1945 in Bonn) was a German anatomist.

He studied medicine in Berlin, where he subsequently worked as a second assistant at the institute of anatomy. From 1895 he served as prosector at the institute for comparative anatomy, embryology and histology at Würzburg. In 1903 he became an associate professor and in 1912 a full professor of topographical anatomy. In 1916 he relocated to the University of Königsberg as director of the anatomical institute, afterwards performing similar duties at the University of Bonn (from 1919).

He is remembered today for the Sobotta atlas of human anatomy, a masterpiece of macroscopic anatomy acclaimed for its high quality and detail. First issued in 1904 with the title Atlas der deskriptiven Anatomie des Menschen ("Atlas of descriptive human anatomy"), it has been published in more than 300 editions in 19 languages (17 editions in English). Sobotta was also the author of Atlas und Grundriß der Histologie und mikroskopischen Anatomie des Menschen (1902), later translated into English and published as Textbook and atlas of human histology and microscopic anatomy.

In 1944 he was awarded the Goethe-Medaille für Kunst und Wissenschaft.

== Notable publications ==
- 1901: Atlas und Grundriß der Histologie und mikroskopischen Anatomie des Menschen.
- 1904–1907: Atlas der deskriptiven Anatomie des Menschen in 3 volumes.
- 1904–1907: Grundriß der deskriptiven Anatomie des Menschen.

== See also ==
- Katharina Kayßer: Johannes Sobotta (1869–1945) – Leben und Wirken unter besonderer Berücksichtigung seiner Würzburger Zeit. Dissertation, Julius-Maximilians-Universität Würzburg 2004, online (PDF-Datei, 7, 63 MB) (German)
- Biografie (PDF-Datei, 7 MB, S. 3-7) (German)
- Literature by and about Johannes Sobotta in the German National Library catalogue (German)
