= Rychtal Region =

Region of Poland

Coordinates: 51°9′N 17°51′E

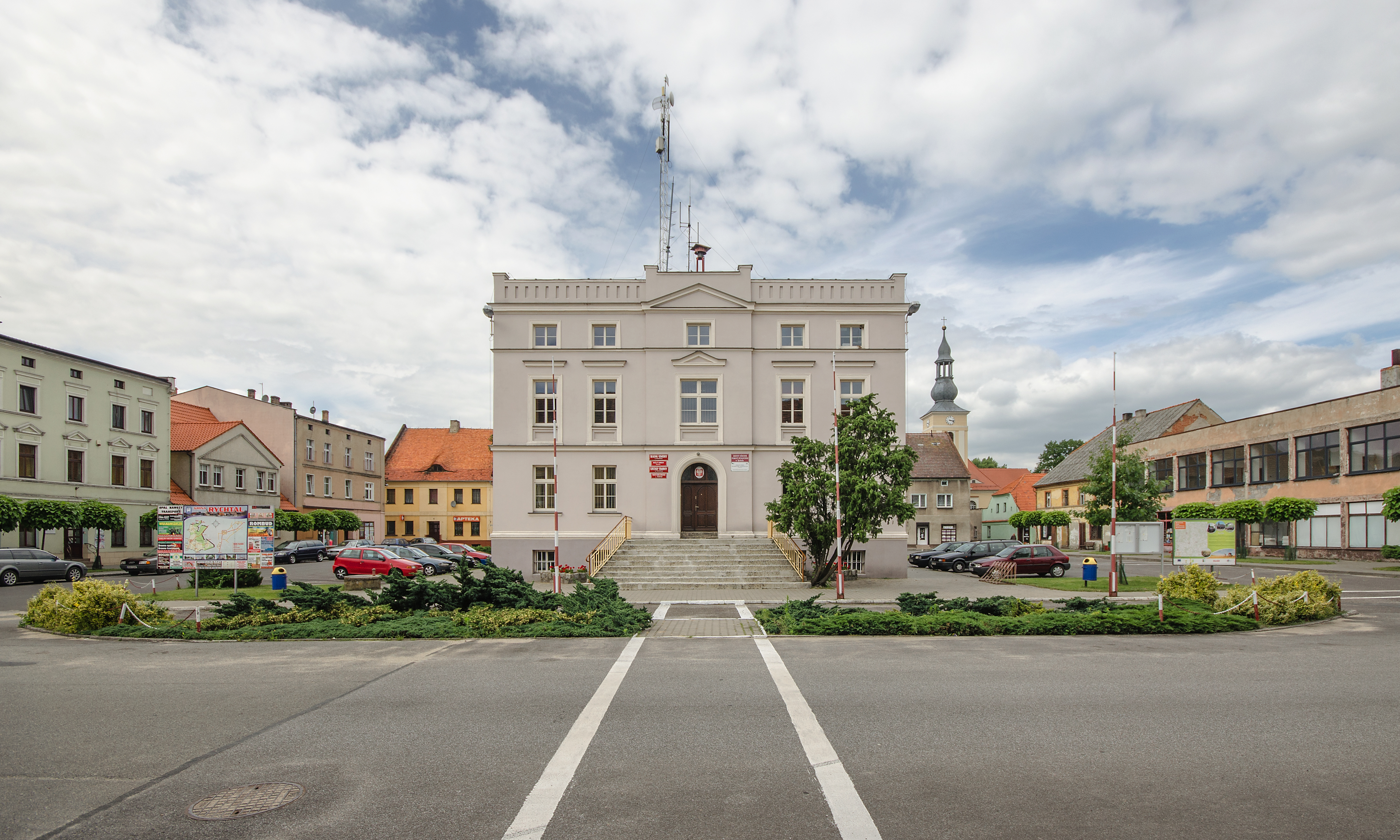
Market Square and town hall in Rychtal

The Rychtal Region (German: Reichthaler Ländchen) is a portion of the historic region of Lower Silesia, the north-eastern part of the former Silesian district of Namslau located around the town of Rychtal, which was ceded by Germany to Poland after World War I.

== Settlements ==
The following towns and villages belonged to the Rychtal Region:

- Darnowiec
- Drożki
- Hanowry
- Krzyżowniki
- Proszów
- Rychtal
- Sadogóra
- Skoroszów
- Stogniewice
- Wielki Buczek
- Zgorzelec

== History ==
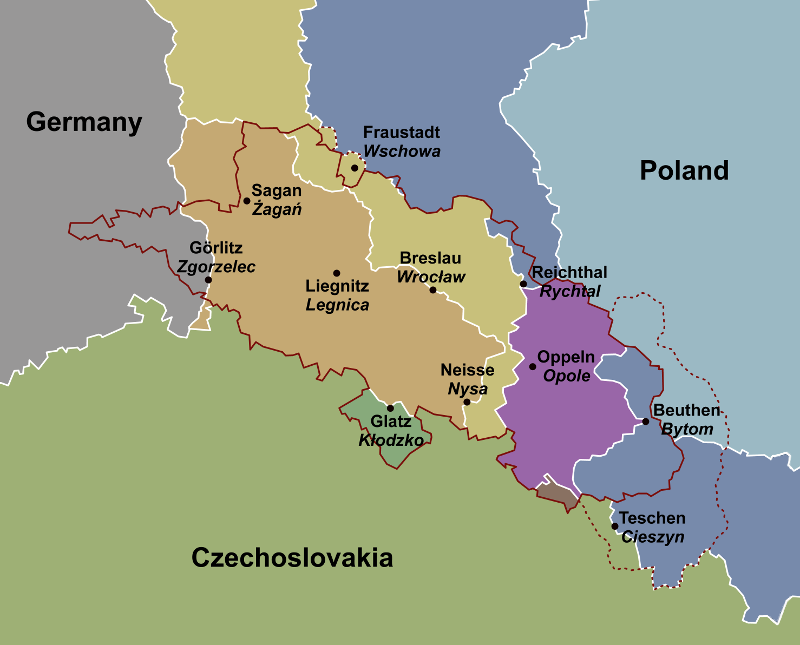
Partitions of Silesia in 1919 and 1945

The territory formed part of Poland since the 10th century. Later on, it passed under the suzerainty of the Kingdom of Bohemia, Kingdom of Hungary and Habsburg monarchy, before it was annexed by Prussia in the 18th century. The region was part of Regierungsbezirk Breslau in the Prussian Province of Silesia, in the German Empire until the end of World War I. After the war, the newly restored Polish state claimed the districts of Namslau (Namysłów) and Oppeln (Opole). In the Treaty of Versailles, Poland was given the eastern part of the Namslau district.

As part of the Upper Silesia plebiscite, a referendum took place in the Namslau voting area. The voting area comprised the south-eastern part of the Namslau district, and included the communities of Bachwitz (Polish: Wielołęka), Dammer, Erbenfeld, Erdmannsdorf, Friedrichsberg, Hennersdorf, Johannesdorf, Noldau (Domaszowice), Ordenstal, Sophiental, Steinersdorf (Siemysłów), Sterzendorf (Starościn) and Wallendorf. Around 97.6% of votes were in favor of this area remaining with Germany. The border was set with this result in mind.

The Rychtal Region with 11 localities, about 85 km^{2} and about 4,600 inhabitants was attached to Poland in 1921 without a referendum. A privately organized survey of the population resulted in a clear vote in favor of remaining with Germany. In the absence of international monitoring, this opinion poll did not meet the requirements of a plebiscite and was not taken into account when drawing the boundary.

Following the joint German-Soviet invasion of Poland, which started World War II in September 1939, the village was occupied by Germany until 1945. In 1939, the Germans carried out the first expulsions of Poles, and several died during their deportation in freight trains to Mińsk Mazowiecki in the more-eastern part of German-occupied Poland. After the war, it was restored to Poland and is now part of the Kępno County in the Greater Poland Voivodeship.
