= East Upper Silesia =

Eastern part of the Upper Silesian region around the city of Katowice

East Upper Silesia (German: Ostoberschlesien) is the easternmost extremity of Silesia, the eastern part of the Upper Silesian region around the city of Katowice (German: Kattowitz). The term is used primarily to denote those areas that became part of the Second Polish Republic on 20 June 1922, as a consequence of the post-World War I Treaty of Versailles. Prior to World War II, the Second Polish Republic administered the area as the Silesian Voivodeship. East Upper Silesia was also known as Polish (Upper) Silesia, and the German (Upper) Silesia was known as West Upper Silesia.

== Upper Silesia Plebiscite ==
Consequently, to the end of World War I in 1918 various proposals emerged defining the division of Upper Silesia. At the Paris Peace Conference a commission for Polish affairs was created to prepare proposals for Polish borders. In their first two proposals (of 27 March 1919 and of 7 May 1919) most of the future province was ceded, together with the region of Oppeln, to Poland. Yet that was not accepted by the Big Four, and following David Lloyd George's suggestion, the plebiscite was organized. Before it took place on 20 March 1921, two Silesian Insurrections instigated by Polish inhabitants of the area were organized. After the referendum, in which Poland had 41% of the votes, a plan of division was created that divided Upper Silesia. Following this, the Third Silesian Uprising took place. The Inter-Allied Commission on Upper Silesia, headed by the French general Henri Le Rond suggested a new plan for division of the area, which was prepared by an ambassadors commission in Paris on 20 October 1921. The division - which became effective by 20 June 1922 - still created a situation in which some rural territories that voted mostly for Poland were granted to Germany and some urban territories with a German majority were granted to Poland. The Polish Sejm decided that the easternmost Upper Silesian areas should become an autonomous area within Poland organised as the Silesian Voivodeship and with Silesian Parliament as a constituency and Silesian Voivodeship Council as the executive body. The part of Silesia awarded to Poland was by far the best-developed and richest region of the newly formed state, producing most of Poland's industrial output. Consequently, to the division in 1922, the German-Polish Accord on East Silesia (Geneva Convention) was concluded on 15 May 1922 which dealt with the constitutional and legal future of Upper Silesia as it has partly become Polish territory.

== Inter-War Silesia ==
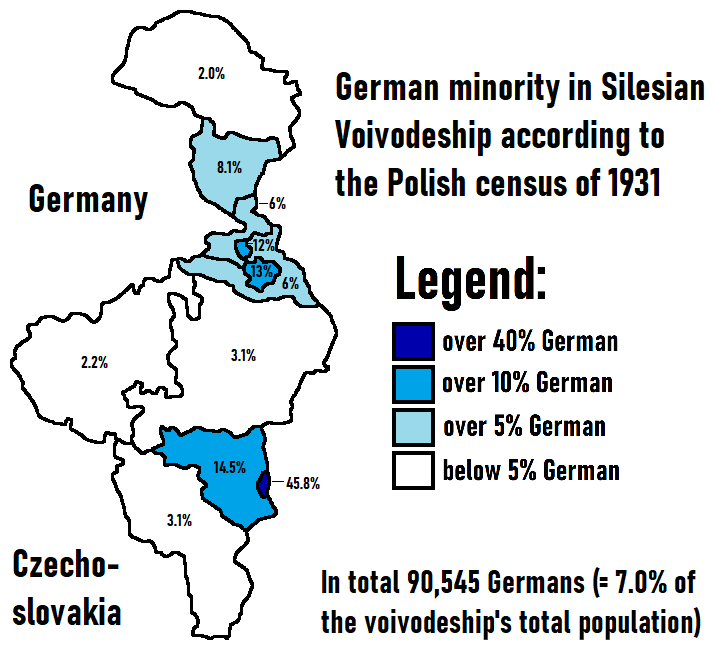
German minority in Polish Silesian Voivodeship in 1931

Division of Prussian Silesia between Weimar Germany, Poland and Czechoslovakia after World War I
Division of:	Area in 1910 (km^{2})	Share of territory	Population in 1910	After WW1 part of:	Notes
Lower Silesia	27,105 km^{2}	100%	3,017,981	Divided between:	
to Poland	527 km^{2}	2%	1%	Poznań Voivodeship (Niederschlesiens Ostmark)	(Note: After World War I, Poland received a small portion of historical Lower Silesia, which had had a majority ethnic Polish population since 1918. This included parts of the counties of Syców (German: Groß Wartenberg), Namysłów, Góra and Milicz, for a total of around 526 km^{2} and 30,000 inhabitants, including the city of Rychtal. As the area was too small to form its own voivodeship, it was incorporated into Poznań Voivodeship (former Posen).)
to Germany	26,578 km^{2}	98%	99%	Province of Lower Silesia	
Upper Silesia	13,230 km^{2}	100%	2,207,981	Divided between:	
to Poland	3,225 km^{2}	25%	41%	Silesian Voivodeship	(Note: Interwar Silesian Voivodeship was formed from Prussian East Upper Silesia (3,225 km^{2}) and the Polish part of Austrian Cieszyn Silesia (1,010 km^{2}), for a total of 4,235 km^{2}. After the annexation of Trans-Olza from Czechoslovakia in 1938, this increased to 5,122 km^{2}. The capital of Silesian Voivodeship was Katowice.)
to Czechoslovakia	325 km^{2}	2%	2%	Hlučín Region	
to Germany	9,680 km^{2}	73%	57%	Province of Upper Silesia	

=== Ethnic and religious structure ===
Linguistic (mother tongue) and religious structure of Silesian Voivodeship according to the 1931 census
County	Pop.	Polish	%	Yiddish & Hebrew	%	German	%	Other language %	Roman Catholic	%	Jewish	%	Protestant	%	Other religion %
Bielsko City	22332	9683	43.4%	2275	10.2%	10220	45.8%	0.7%	12645	56.6%	4430	19.8%	5108	22.9%	0.7%
Bielsko County	62584	52895	84.5%	380	0.6%	9059	14.5%	0.4%	47995	76.7%	1253	2.0%	12917	20.6%	0.7%
Chorzów City	101977	88753	87.0%	1148	1.1%	11929	11.7%	0.1%	94010	92.2%	2811	2.8%	4870	4.8%	0.3%
Cieszyn	81087	77717	95.8%	529	0.7%	2531	3.1%	0.4%	52004	64.1%	1940	2.4%	26496	32.7%	0.8%
Katowice City	126058	107040	84.9%	1577	1.3%	16936	13.4%	0.4%	113209	89.8%	5716	4.5%	6414	5.1%	0.6%
Mysłowice City	22696	20372	89.8%	152	0.7%	2126	9.4%	0.2%	21447	94.5%	463	2.0%	703	3.1%	0.4%
Siemianowice Śląskie City	37790	34934	92.4%	53	0.1%	2780	7.4%	0.1%	35838	94.8%	240	0.6%	1644	4.4%	0.2%
Katowice Countryside	154659	147169	95.2%	81	0.1%	7265	4.7%	0.1%	151224	97.8%	421	0.3%	2708	1.8%	0.2%
Lubliniec	45232	44196	97.7%	29	0.1%	920	2.0%	0.2%	44609	98.6%	144	0.3%	405	0.9%	0.2%
Pszczyna	162015	156750	96.8%	74	0.0%	5037	3.1%	0.1%	152958	94.4%	348	0.2%	8519	5.3%	0.1%
Rybnik	212829	207866	97.7%	65	0.0%	4584	2.2%	0.1%	208907	98.2%	388	0.2%	3193	1.5%	0.2%
Świętochłowice	201176	189074	94.0%	37	0.0%	11948	5.9%	0.1%	196978	97.9%	424	0.2%	3394	1.7%	0.2%
Tarnowskie Góry	64592	59186	91.6%	67	0.1%	5210	8.1%	0.2%	63212	97.9%	360	0.6%	898	1.4%	0.2%
Total	1295027	1195635	92.3%	6467	0.5%	90545	7.0%	0.2%	1195036	92.3%	18938	1.5%	77269	6.0%	0.3%

== Nazi Germany ==
East Upper Silesia was annexed by Nazi Germany along with other Polish areas following the invasion of Poland in 1939, which triggered the outbreak of World War II. Until 1941, the region was administered as Regierungsbezirk Kattowitz, the easternmost government region of the Silesia Province. From 1941 to 1945, it was part of the Upper Silesia Province. Under Nazi rule, Upper Silesia included the cities of Beuthen, Gleiwitz, Hindenburg in Oberschlesien, Kattowitz, and Königshütte. It also contained the rural districts (Landkreis) of Bendsburg, Beuthen-Tarnowitz, Bielitz, Kattowitz, Krenau, Ilkenau, Pless, Rybnik, Saybusch, Teschen, and Toszek-Gleiwitz.

In the spring of 1945, the region was occupied by the Red Army after the Silesian Offensives defeated the Wehrmacht there.

== Present day ==
After the war, East Upper Silesia was restored to Poland. Poland also received West Upper Silesia and most of Lower Silesia as part of the Recovered Territories. Today, the region is roughly represented by the Silesian Voivodeship.

== See also ==
- Administrative divisions of Nazi Germany
- Eastern Front (World War II)
- History of Poland (1939–1945)
- History of Silesia
