= Hans-Adolf von Moltke =

German diplomat (1884–1943)

Hans-Adolf Helmuth Ludwig Erdmann Waldemar von Moltke
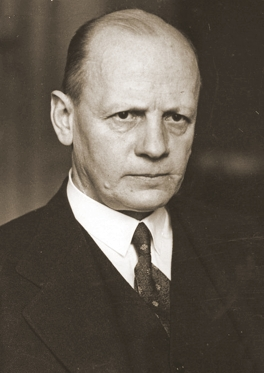
- Born: 29 November 1884; Oppeln, Province of Silesia, Kingdom of Prussia, German Empire (now Opole, Poland)
- Died: 22 March 1943 (aged 58); Madrid, Spain
- Years active: 1913–1943
- Known for: German ambassador to Poland and Spain
- Political party: Nazi Party

Hans-Adolf Helmuth Ludwig Erdmann Waldemar von Moltke (29 November 1884 – 22 March 1943) was a German landowner in Silesia who became a diplomat. He served as ambassador in Poland during the Weimar Republic and the Third Reich. After the German invasion of Poland, he became Adolf Hitler's ambassador in Spain during the Second World War.

== Early life and career ==
Moltke was born in Oppeln (now Opole), in Upper Silesia, into one of Germany's most famous aristocratic families. Moltke's father, Fredrich von Moltke, served as the Prussian minister of the interior. Moltke was a devout Lutheran and held the standard nationalist and conservative views that were typical of the German aristocracy in the late 19th century. Coming from a family long noted for its service to the Prussia and then Germany, Moltke ascribed to the viewpoint that it was the greatest honour to serve the state and held that view throughout his life.

Moltke studied law from 1903 to 1907 at Heidelberg University and joined the Corps Saxo-Borussia Heidelberg in 1904, an elite student fraternity that accepted only royalty and nobility.

After university, he joined the Prussian Army and served it for one year. He then joined Foreign Service in 1913.

Moltke was also a land owner and had the estates of Wernersdorf and of Klein-Bresa in Silesia.

In joining the Auswärtiges Amt (German Foreign Office), Moltke joined one of the most exclusive and prestigious branches of the German state. In the Imperial era, joining the Auswärtiges Amt required a candidate to have a university degree, preferably in jurisprudence; to be fluent in French and one other foreign language; and to have an income of 15,000 marks per year, which ensured that only men from very wealthy families could work as diplomats. The average cost of obtaining a university degree in Imperial Germany over the course of four years of study ranged from about 9,000 marks to 25,000 marks, depending on the university, which ensured that only people from very well-off families attended university.

The Auswärtiges Amt was very much dominated by the aristocracy, who were much favored over commoners. Aristocrats made up 1% of the German population but 69% of the German diplomatic corps during the Imperial era. Even after the November Revolution of 1918 until 1945, the Auswärtiges Amt remained dominated by an aristocratic "old boy's club" network, which ensured that aristocrats continued to be disproportionately overrepresented in the German diplomatic corps.

The income requirement prevented Moltke from joining the Auswärtiges Amt earlier, and he could join only in January 1913, after his father agreed to subsidised him to provide the required 15,000 marks per year.

He began his diplomatic career at the German legation in Athens and the next year was transferred over to the German embassy in Constantinople (now Istanbul), the capital of the Ottoman Empire. In 1915, Moltke was transferred to Brussels, where he served as an official in the German occupation government of Belgium.

He later served as the Prussian envoy in Stuttgart, the capital of the Kingdom of Württemberg. When Eliza von Moltke, the widow of his cousin (Field Marshal Helmuth von Moltke the Younger) and Rudolf Steiner tried publishing his memoirs posthumously, Moltke the diplomat played a key role in blocking the publication. Moltke contacted Steiner to tell him that "Berlin did not desire" the publication of his cousin's memoirs and said that it revealed too much about the origins of the First World War. At the same time, Moltke told Eliza von Moltke that she could not publish her late husband's memoirs until they had been reviewed by his father, who was now the leader of the Moltke clan and reserved the right to censor any passages that he disliked. The memoir was finally published in 1922 after extensive censorship imposed by the Moltke clan. Much of the writing was bowdlerised of any content that might implicate Germany and Field Marshal von Moltke as responsible for the war.

In common with the other conservative civil servants of the Imperial era, Moltke saw Germany's defeat in the war and the November Revolution of 1918 as twin disasters, which threatened to ruin the Reich. Moltke chose to continue his diplomatic career after 1918 out of loyalty towards Germany, not the Weimar Republic, which he saw as a transitional regime, which would be replaced sooner or later. Moltke represented the German Foreign Office at the Allied Commission of the Upper Silesia plebiscite in Oppeln from 1920 to 1922 and the Joint Commission for Upper Silesia from 1922 to 1924. Moltke arrived in Upper Silesia in early 1920.

During the Upper Silesia referendum, Moltke fought against the Allied Special Court of Justice for Upper Silesia and argued to French General Henri Le Rond, who chaired the commission, that it violated the Treaty of Versailles, which stated the Allied Commission for Upper Silesia did not have the power to pass legislation. Moltke reported to Berlin on 27 February 1920 that Le Rond simply refused to consider his arguments.

On 10 March, Moltke handed Le Rond a note saying that no German judges would co-operate with the Allied Special Court of Justice, which led Le Rond to threaten to expel from Upper Silesia any judge who refused to work with the special court. The German judges refused to work with Inter-Allied Commission, which found it impossible to expel all of the judges from Upper Silesia.

In June 1920, the Inter-Allied Commission agreed to accept Moltke's demands of providing German judges freedom from the authority of the Inter-Allied Commission.

During the Upper Silesia conflicts, Moltke served as a meditator between the Selbstschutz militia, which was founded to fight against the Poles, and the Inter-Allied Commission, which was appointed to oversee the referendum to divide Upper Silesia between Germany and Poland.

The referendum of 1921 and its aftermath saw much fighting, as German and Polish irregulars battled to seize as much of Upper Silesia as possible for their own nations. Through Moltke preferred to keep Upper Silesia in Germany, he was known for his Realpolitik, which led him to accept that at least part of Upper Silesia would go to Poland. In terms of personality, Moltke was characterized as always displaying "tact, politeness and a cultivated demeanor".

Moltke fought to retain as of Upper Silesia as possible for Germany but displayed much "diplomatic dexterity" during the crisis caused by referendum, as he sought to balance the demands of the Allies and of his nationalism. Moltke warned Berlin against seeking a military solution to retain Upper Silesia. He stated any victories won by the Freikorps would be likely to trigger French intervention on the side of Poland.

Moltke also served as Counselor at the German Embassy in Ankara, Turkey, from 1924 to 1928. Upon his return to Berlin, he headed the Eastern Department of the Auswärtiges Amt, and replaced Herbert von Dirksen, to be in charge of relations with all of the East European states.

Moltke was a member of a group called the Dienstags-Kreis, which promoted the idea of Mitteleuropa, a federation of Central European states that would be dominated by Germany.

== Ambassador in Poland ==
From 1931 to the 1939 German invasion of Poland, Moltke was the ambassador in Warsaw. He arrived there in February 1931 as the minister in charge of the German legation. He supported a revanchist policy against Poland but believed that could be carried out peacefully. Moltke's beliefs about Poland were based on the concept of the Kulturträgertum ("cultural carrier"), which held that Poland was economically and culturally backward and would eventually fall into the German sphere of influence. Poland had been allied to France since 1921, but Moltke believed that French culture was inferior to German culture and hence everything French was inferior to everything German. He further maintained that Poland would inevitably realize that and then allow German influence to supplement French influence in Poland. Moltke thus found no contradiction between his efforts to improve German-Polish relations and his support for a policy of taking back the lands that Germany had lost to Poland by the Treaty of Versailles.

Wiaderny wrote that Moltke's Kulturträgertum concept "cannot be taken seriously". However, there was at least an element of truth to Moltke's thinking in that Germany had the largest economy in Europe and the second-largest economy in the world, after only the American economy. From the Polish perspective, Germany had more to offer Poland in economic terms than France. Moltke was unwilling to accept the borders imposed by the Treaty of Versailles, but by the standards of the Auswärtiges Amt, he was moderate towards Poland.

Moltke believed that Germany could and should regain the lands lost under Versailles via peaceful means, and he was willing to accept the continued existence of Poland, albeit only within the German sphere of influence. The Auswärtiges Amt was a bastion of anti-Polish feelings, and almost all of the German diplomatic corps in the interwar period tended to accept that it would be necessary for Germany sooner or later to put an end to Poland.

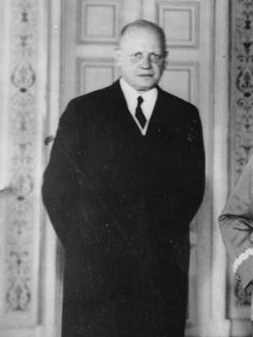
Hans-Adolf von Moltke in 1934.

In November 1932, Colonel Józef Beck was appointed Polish Foreign Minister. A cold ruthless man with a strong opportunistic streak, Beck inspired little affection from those who knew him, and his actions as the deputy foreign minister during the 1932 Danzig crisis suggested to Moltke that he would be most forceful in upholding Polish rights in the Free City of Danzig (now Gdańsk, Poland). However, Beck had been declared persona non grata by the French government during his time as a diplomat in Paris after he had been caught spying on his hosts. That had made him very anti-French, and Moltke felt that Beck's appointment as foreign minister would ensure a weakening of French influence in Poland. Moltke had difficult relations with Beck, who was generally hated by almost all ambassadors in Warsaw, but Moltke saw Beck as pro-German and anti-French.

In 1933, Moltke welcomed the new Nazi regime. In common with the other diplomats of the Auswärtiges Amt, Moltke believed that Adolf Hitler would bring about a revival of Germany as a great power and would curtail what he considered to be "Jewish influence" in German life. Moltke's biographer, the German historian Bernard Wiaderny, wrote: "While anti-Semitic resentments were part and parcel of Moltke's worldview, it was not an eliminatory anti-Semitism. As far as possible, he was also prepared to continue collaborating with Jewish diplomats, journalists, etc."

In March 1933, the National Socialists in Danzig were in the process of taking over the Free City. Developments there tended to be very closely influenced by developments in the Reich, and as the Nazis imposed their control over Germany in March 1933, the Danzig Nazis did the same. A series of incidents between Danzig Nazis and the Polish authorities in early March 1933 pushed tensions in the Free City to the brink of war. Fearing that presaged an effort to have the Free City rejoin Germany, the Polish government started to talk about war with Germany and moved to reinforce its garrison in Danzig. On 6 March 1933, the Polish garrison on the Westerplatte Peninsula, in Danzig Harbour, was increased from 60 to 200 men.

On 1 April 1933, the national anti-Jewish boycott in Germany was responded to by a number of Polish Jewish groups, which organised a boycott of German businesses and goods in Poland. Moltke, in a dispatch to Berlin, charged that the "anti-German" Polish Jews had engaged in "terror tactics" during the boycott, and he complained that people who shopped at German-owned businesses in Poland had been accosted on the streets by activists.

On 12 April 1933, what proved to be a crucial meeting with Beck suggested that Poland was open to better relations with Germany and was willing to consider a non-aggression pact. On 23 April 1933, Moltke reported to German Foreign Minister. Baron Konstantin von Neurath that rumours of a Polish preventive war were just a negotiating tactic, and he thought it very unlikely that Poland would actually go to war. Moltke repeated those views in dispatches to Berlin on 25 and 26 April 1933, the last of which was considered important enough to be read by Hitler. Germany had frequently used the Human Rights Committee of the League of Nations as a forum for airing complaints about Poland's treatment of its Volksdeutsche (ethnic German) minority as a way to gain international sympathy for its revanchist foreign policy of taking back the lands lost under the Treaty of Versailles. In the spring of 1933, the Polish delegation at the League of Nations started using the Human Rights Committee to air complaints about the treatment of German Jews by the new Nazi government. Moltke barely contained his rage at the Polish tactics in Geneva and wrote with much fury on 26 April 1933 that Poland, which he called "the classic land of anti-Semitic pogroms", was presenting itself as the defender of the German Jews at the League of Nations, which he called an outrageous and unacceptable diplomatic tactic.

On 30 August 1933, Moltke reported to Berlin that the Great Depression had badly hurt the Polish economy and that for economic reasons, the Polish de facto dictator, Jan Piłsudski, wanted better relations with Germany, which had the largest economy in Europe. Moltke urged the end of the tariff war against Poland and said that the trade war, which had been launched in 1925, had failed in its aim to force Poland to return the Polish Corridor and Upper Silesia and to allow Danzig to rejoin Germany. Moltke argued that since the trade war had failed, the chance for better German-Polish relations should be pursued as a way of weakening French influence in Europe.

Moltke's suggestion was taken up, and in September 1933, he started talks on ending the trade war. At the time, Germany was preparing to leave the World Disarmament Conference in Geneva to pursue rearmament, and there were fears in Berlin of a preventive war from France. Improving relations with France's ally, Poland, was seen as a way to lessen that possibility. The principal problem in the German-Polish economic talks proved to be the Polish demand for Germany to allow the imports of coal from Upper Silesia, and once it was agreed in November 1933 that Germany would accept a quota of Polish coal, the economic talks proceeded well and quickly.

In November 1933, following the signing of the economic agreement ending the trade war, Moltke met with Piłsudski to offer him a non-aggression pact, which greatly interested the latter. As Poland was one of France's key allies in Eastern Europe, a German-Polish non-aggression pact was seen in Berlin as a way to weaken French influence in Eastern Europe. In Warsaw, the French decision to build the Maginot Line strongly (and correctly) indicated that France intended to pursue a defensive strategy in the event of a war with Germany. That made it imperative, from Warsaw's perspective, to improve relations with Germany, rather than face the full force of the German military alone.

The signing of the non-aggression pact of January 1934 greatly improved German-Polish relations. A media agreement was signed soon afterward under which the German media stop attacking Poland in exchange for the Polish media ceasing to criticise Germany. In a sign of improved relations, in March 1934, Poland and Germany upgraded their relations to the ambassadorial level, and the legations in Berlin and Warsaw became embassies. Moltke was promoted from the German minister in Warsaw to being the ambassador. By June 1934, relations had improved enough for the German propaganda minister, Josef Goebbels, to visit Warsaw to meet Piłsudski with Moltke serving as his guide. On 21 February 1936, Moltke reported to Berlin that the unwillingness of either Britain or France to impose sanctions on Poland for abandoning the Minorities Treaty in 1934 showed that the great powers were indifferent to minorities in Europe.

During the crisis that was caused by the remilitarisation of the Rhineland in March 1936, Beck assured Moltke during a meeting on 9 March 1936 that his promise to come to France's assistance if France went to war was "in practice, without effect", as Beck did not actually expect the French to march into the Rhineland. Beck stated to Moltke that the former had made the promise only to maintain the Franco-Polish alliance, as Beck was engaged in negotiations for French financial assistance for the nascent Polish arms industry. Beck strongly implied that Poland would be neutral if the French moved to evict the Wehrmacht from the demilitarised zone of the Rhineland. In the aftermath of the remilitarisation, which violated the Treaties of Versailles and Locarno, there was much discussion about having the League of Nations impose sanctions on Germany. The Polish delegation at the League's headquarters in Geneva joined forces with other delegations from Eastern Europe, Scandinavia and Latin America, all of which argued that sanctions on Germany would be "economic suicide" for their nations. Moltke took the Polish opposition to sanctions as proving his thesis that closer economic ties would inevitably bring Poland into the German sphere of influence, both economically and politically.

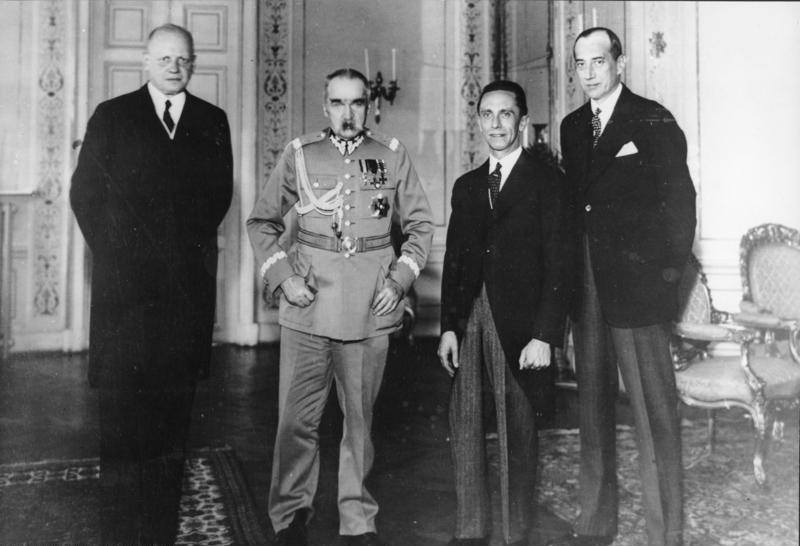
German ambassador, Hans-Adolf von Moltke, Polish leader Józef Piłsudski, German propaganda minister Joseph Goebbels and Polish Foreign Minister Józef Beck, meeting in Warsaw on 15 June 1934, five months after the signing of the Polish-German Non-Aggression Pact.

In 1936, the German and the Polish governments joined forces to oust Seán Lester, the Irish diplomat who served as the League of Nations High Commissioner for the Free City of Danzig. Lester's efforts to protect the rights of Danzig's Jewish minority made him unpopular in Berlin and with the Nazi-dominated government of the Free City.

Lester was replaced as the League of Nations high commissioner with the Swiss diplomat Carl Jacob Burckhardt, who proved to be accommodating about the violations of the Free City's constitution concerning human rights. Beck stated at the time to Moltke that he did not care about Danzig's Jewish minority, most of whom spoke German, if the rights of Danzig's Polish minority were protected.

In June 1937, Moltke was ordered by Hitler to start negotiations with Beck concerning the status of the German minority in Poland and the Polish minority in Germany. Beck rejected the offer of a bilateral treaty but proposed parallel declarations in Berlin and Warsaw concerning the status of their respective minorities. The negotiations for the declarations were complicated by Beck's demand for Germany to issue a declaration that it would not seek to change the status of Danzig. Hitler proved reluctant to issue a statement, but such a statement was eventually issued in September 1937. On 1 October 1937, Moltke joined the Nazi Party.

During the Sudetenland Crisis in 1938, Moltke reported to Berlin that Beck regarded the crisis as an opportunity for Poland to claim the Teschen region (now Cieszyn Silesia). Moltke stated that it was Beck's firm opinion that if the German-speaking Sudetenland were transferred to Germany on the basis of national self-determination, the same principle should be invoked to allow Poland to claim the Polish-speaking areas of Teschen.

Moltke reported that his conversations with Beck made him believe if Germany invaded Czechoslovakia, Poland was unlikely to come to the defence of Czechoslovakia and, under the right conditions, might even invade Czechoslovakia itself. During the crisis, Moltke was highly concerned that Poland might side with Czechoslovakia during a German invasion, and he went out of his way to improve Polish-German relations.

When Herschel Grynszpan, a stateless Jew of Polish background, shot the German diplomat Ernst vom Rath at the embassy in Paris, Moltke was tasked with collecting material that was intended to be unflattening about the Grynszpan family, which had left Poland for Germany in 1921.

In his statement to the Polish press after the Kristallnacht, Moltke spoke about the "collective Jewish" responsibility for Rath's assassination. Unable to find the unflattening information, which was intended to prove that the Grynszpan family lived in criminality, Moltke simply fabricated stories that cast the family as criminals, who had left Poland to escape the law.

On 22 November 1938, Moltke met with Colonel Beck. The Polish transcript of the meeting had Moltke reassuring Beck that the recent statements by the German Foreign Minister Joachim von Ribbentrop to the Polish ambassador in Berlin, Józef Lipski, demanding that the Free City of Danzig be returned to Germany where merely Ribbentrop's personal views and did not reflect the views of Hitler who wanted good German-Polish relations. The German account of the meeting did not include these remarks. The British historian D.C. Watt argued that Moltke did make these remarks, but excluded from his account of the meeting in order to avoid the wrath of Ribbentrop who would have been furious if he had read them.

In December 1938, Beck told Moltke that he desired for Poland and Hungary to have a common border and asked Moltke if the Reich had any objections. That led Moltke to advise against challenging the First Vienna Award, which gave parts of the renamed Czecho-Slovakia to Hungary. On 14 December 1938, Beck told Moltke that the establishment of an autonomous government in Carpatho-Ukraine, as Ruthenia had been renamed, had "evoked a certain excitement" in Poland, as there were fears that it would encourage Ukrainian nationalism in Galicia. Beck frankly told Moltke that he wanted Hungary to annex Capartho-Ukraine to put an end to possibility of a Ukrainian state in the Carpathian Mountains, which might encourage Ukrainian separatism in Galicia.

In December 1938, Moltke was summoned from Warsaw to be present at a summit at Hitler's retreat, at the Berghof, in the Bavarian Alps. Hitler had invited Beck and Moltke to see him at the Berghof, together with Foreign Minister Joachim von Ribbentrop. The main issue at the summit turned not to Danzig, as had been expected, but Hitler's demands for Poland to sign the Anti-Comintern Pact and to promise to assist Germany in conquering the Soviet Union, which Beck rejected.

== Danzig crisis ==
In January 1939, Moltke unsuccessfully approached Beck with an offer under which if Poland allowed Danzig to "go home to the Reich", Germany would support Poland annexing the entire Soviet Ukraine. Meanwhile, Moltke began to press Beck to have Poland sign the Anti-Comintern Pact and said that Germany attached much importance to such a move. Beck also rejected that offer. Signing the Anti-Comintern Pact was seen in Berlin as a symbolic way of a state associating with the Reich. Meanwhile, the German embassy in Budapest successfully pressured Hungary into signing the Anti-Comintern Pact. On 25 February 1939, a group of Polish university students held a demonstration outside the German embassy in Warsaw and threw bricks though the windows. The Polish chef de protocole apolgised to Moltke for the incident.

On 26 February 1939, Moltke reported to Berlin with worry that Beck was planning to visit London in March and perhaps Paris as well. Moltke reported that Beck wanted to improve Anglo-Polish relations, which in the interwar era had been distant and hostile. During most of the interwar period, Britain tended to support the German claims to the Polish Corridor and Upper Silesia. That made Anglo-Polish relations very adversarial at best. Moltke stated that Beck "desires to get into touch with the Western democracies... for the fear that a conflict might arise with Germany over Danzig". Moltke portrayed Beck's sudden interest in improving Anglo-Polish relations as a sign of deteriorating German-Polish relations and noted that the Poles tended to distrust the British, which made Beck's planned visit to London appear unusual.

On 23 March 1939, Moltke reported that the German annexation of the Memelland was "a very unpleasant surprise" in Warsaw. Moltke added "the main reason for this is that it is generally feared that now it will be the turn of Danzig and the Corridor". He also reported that the Polish government had ordered a partial mobilisation and was concentrating troops outside of the Free City of Danzig with the implied threat that Poland would occupy Danzig. Ribbentrop wrote up a démarche for Moltke to deliver to Beck that demanded that Poland allow the Free City of Danzig to rejoin Germany and offered parts of the Soviet Ukraine as a reward. Ribbentrop went on to write that if Beck rejected the démarche, Moltke was to tell him that Poland would be considered an enemy of the Reich. On 25 March 1939, Beck formally rejected a démarche from Moltke that requested that the return of Danzig to Germany. Beck told Moltke that changing the status of Danzig was not a subject open to negotiation. On 28 March 1939, Beck told Moltke that if the Senate of the Free City voted to have Danzig "go home to the Reich", as was then being discussed, that would be regarded as a casus belli by Poland. Moltke, speaking in French, the language of diplomacy at the time, protested, "You want to negotiate at the point of a bayonet!" Beck sarcastically replied in French, "That is your own method". Beck told Moltke in no uncertain terms that his government was not prepared to see Danzig rejoin Germany and was quite willing to go to war over the issue. On 28 March 1939, Beck informed Moltke in no uncertain terms that Poland was quite prepared to go to war if Germany tried unilaterally change the status of Danzig.

On 29 March 1939, Baron Ernst von Weizsäcker, the State Secretary of the Auswärtiges Amt, stated in a message to the Danzig government the Reich would carry out a policy of Zermürbungspolitik (point of destruction) towards Poland and said that a compromise solution was not wanted to the Danzig Crisis. To reinforce the point, on 5 April 1939, Weizsäcker told Moltke that under no conditions was he to negotiate with the Poles as Weizsäcker's major fear was now that Beck might actually agree to the Free City rejoining Germany, which would deprive the Reich of its ostensible casus belli for war with Poland.

Following his orders, Moltke refused to engage in any discussions about a solution to the Danzig crisis and stuck rigidly in public to the demand that the Free City "go home to the Reich", which he knew that the Poles would never accept. Unknown to Moltke, Rudolf von Scheliha, the Second Secretary at the Warsaw embassy, was a Soviet spy and reported on all the details of German policy towards Poland to his Soviet paymasters. In that way, Joseph Stalin was well aware that Hitler had decided upon war with Poland and that the Danzig crisis was a just pretext.

The Auswärtiges Amt as an institution was very anti-Polish, and in 1939, the vast majority of the German diplomats such as Weizsäcker; Herbert von Dirksen, the ambassador in London; and Johannes von Welczeck, the ambassador in Paris, welcomed the news that Hitler had decided to invade Poland. Moltke was unique in the Auswärtiges Amt in opposing the idea of invading Poland, as he still believed that it could be brought eventually into the German sphere of influence via economic means. On 31 March 1939, Britain issued the "guarantee" of Poland and stated any German attempt to end Polish independence would lead to a British declaration of war on Germany. Ribbentrop presented the British "guarantee" as part of a British "encirclement" policy towards Germany, but Moltke privately supported the "guarantee", which he believed would achieve its desired end of deterring Germany from invading Poland. Furthermore, Moltke believed that British involvement in the Danzig Crisis would lead to British pressure on the Poles to allow the Free City to rejoin Germany. Moltke initially wanted the Danzig Crisis to end the same way as the Sudetenland Cisis had ended, a Munich-type agreement that would allow the Reich to achieve its ostensible aims without a war.

In late April 1939, Moltke was recalled to Berlin to meet with Ribbentrop, who threatened to fire him if he continued to advise that a peaceful outcome to the Danzig Crisis was still possible. On 5 May 1939, Moltke returned to Warsaw, where he loyally, if reluctantly, followed Ribbentrop's orders of pushing the crisis to the brink. Moltke's biographer described his stance in the Danzig crisis as "passive", as Moltke was not in agreement with the policy that he was ordered to carry it out, but he was far too deeply committed to serving the German state to disagree with or to disobey his orders.

On 1 August 1939, Moltke wrote an assessment of Poland and offered his observations about the sort of occupation policy Germany should pursue once Fall Weiss (Case White) started. That was the codename for the invasion of Poland, which was scheduled for 25 August 1939 but was later pushed back to 1 September 1939. Moltke argued that the Roman Catholic Church was the spiritual centre of Polish life and that to break Polish national consciousness would require breaking the Church. In a statement that appeared to greatly influence German occupation policy, Moltke advised a harsher policy towards the Church in the areas of Poland that were to be annexed to the Reich, as opposed to the areas that were to be merely occupied. Moltke reported that Polish morale was high and wrote that "the slogans of government propaganda are blindly believed". He singled out the Church as a sponsor of Polish nationalism and said that many priests were asking their congregations to pray for victory if the crisis led to war and were warning in their sermons that Poland "stood on the precipice of a holy war". As an example of the "anti-German" tendency in the Polish Church, Moltke reported that August Hlond, the Catholic archbishop of Poznań, had asked the priests of his diocese to pray for peace, which many priests had altered into praying for Germany to back down in the crisis, or at least a Polish victory if the crisis led to war. Moltke portrayed the Polish people as almost mindlessly bellicose and wrote,: "The old hatred of everything German and the conviction that it is Poland's destiny to cross swords with Germany are too deeply rooted to allow passions once inflamed, to die away soon". Moltke predicated that there was no possibility of the Polish government allowing the Free City to rejoin Germany and said that even if that happened, the Sanation dictatorship would be promptly overthrown in a popular revolution.

On 4 August 1939, in response to the ongoing harassment of Polish custom inspectors in the Free City, Beck issued a diplomatic note that the Polish custom inspectors in Danzig would be armed at all times, and if the government of the Free City continued its campaign of harassment, that would regarded "as an act of violence" against the Poland, which would "retaliate without delay against the Free City". On 6 August 1939, Moltke, in a telephone call to Foreign Minister Joachim von Ribbentrop, stated that there was "hardly any doubt" that Poland would go to war "if there was a clear violation" of the Polish rights in the Free City. Increasingly aggressive notes were exchanged between Polish and German diplomats, with both sides accusing the other of seeking to inflame the crisis into a war.

On 9 August 1939, Ribbentrop forbade Moltke from returning to Warsaw after Moltke had arrived to take his summer vacation in Germany. The same order was also applied to Herbert von Dirksen, the German ambassador in London, and to Count Johannes von Welczeck, the German ambassador in Paris. On 9 August 1939, Ribbentrop's deputy, Dr. Brücklmeir, phoned Moltke to tell him that was not to return to Warsaw and remain in Germany. Moltke very much wanted to return to Poland to oversee the return of German citizens in Poland before the war started and protested the order, saying he felt "like a captain who had deserted his company at the critical moment". As the crisis was heating up in the late summer of 1939, Ribbentrop was afraid of the possibility of diplomatic concessions that might resolve the crisis peacefully and accordingly wanted all of his ambassadors out of London, Paris and Warsaw to hinder efforts to negotiate an end to the crisis. Moltke, who was aware that Germany had decided to invade Poland, protested the order and said that as the German ambassador to Poland, he had the responsibility of evacuating the German citizens in Poland before the war started.

== White Book ==
Moltke then returned to the Foreign Office in Berlin, where he headed the Archive Commission for the evaluation of captured files. Moltke was opposed to the creation of the Government-General and advocated in a memo the creation of a Polish puppet government with very few powers that would sign a peace treaty with Germany. He said that most Poles were loyal to the government-in-exile.

In late 1939, Moltke was appointed the documentary editor of The White Book, a color book containing German and Polish diplomatic documents that was intended to prove the "war guilt" of Poland. Molkte selectively edited the documents such as by excising his warning to Berlin in a cable that he sent in March 1939 that warned that Poland would go to war if the Reich sought to alter the status of the Free City of Danzig. Moltke also excluded from The White Book the transcript of Hitler's meeting with Robert Coulondre, the French ambassador on 26 August 1939, which did not make Hitler appear in a favourable light.

== Kozłowski affair ==
Moltke during his time in Warsaw had known Leon Kozłowski, a conservative Polish politician who supported the Sanation regime and who served as Polish prime minister in 1934 to 1935. Kozłowski was living in Lwów (now Lviv, Ukraine) in 1939, when he was taken prisoner by the Soviet NKVD and held in Moscow from March 1940 onward. His experience of hunger and beatings left him with a raging hatred of the Soviet Union and a belief that Nazi Germany was the lesser evil by comparison. In September 1941, he was allowed to join the Anders Army, which was being formed to fight against the Wehrmacht from which he deserted in October 1941. On 10 November, Kozłowski surrendered to the Wehrmacht. Kozłowski was taken to Berlin, where Moltke approached him with an offer to serve the Reich. Kozłowski was not keen to appear as a collaborator, but Moltke convinced him that speaking about his experiences in the Soviet Union to the world press would not be collaboration.

On 11 January 1942, Kozłowski appeared in a press conference in Berlin to denounce the Soviet Union; described his captivity in the Soviet Union in much detail; and criticised the Polish government-in-exile, led by General Władysław Sikorski, for signing an alliance with the Soviet Union, which he labelled the real enemy of Poland. In Germany, Kozłowski's press conference was considered to be a propaganda triumph, and excerpts from his press conference were extensively reprinted in pamphlets in both German, Polish and Russian to provide an example of what Germany was fighting for on the Eastern Front. Kozłowski's statements that his experiences of Soviet prisons had left him convinced that Russia was a "barbaric Asian" nation that was not and never could be a "civilized European" nation was much quoted in German newspapers as an example how Operation Barbarossa was a war to "defend European civilization". In Poland, Kozłowski's press conference was considered to be a national scandal. In London, a military court of the Polish government-in-exile convicted Kozłowski in absentia of treason and desertion and handed down a death sentence.

== Ambassador in Spain ==
On 10 January 1943, Moltke was nominated as the ambassador in Madrid. He was generally considered to be a "reliable Nazi", one reason for his appointment to Spain. The other reason was Nazi atrocities in Poland, especially against the Catholic Church, which had given Germany an image problem in Catholic Spain. It was felt that Moltke, as the former ambassador in Warsaw, was the best man to explain the atrocities away. Moltke crossed into Spain via train and arrived in the Basque town of Irún. Moltke wrote in his diary: "More troops in the Pyrenees? A pre-emptive measure in case of an Allied attempt to invade Spain? Intensive negotiations with the Spanish Government about the Spanish participation in the war?"

Upon his arrival in Madrid, he noted the huge number of staff attached to the German embassy, numbering about 500, which led him to describe the embassy as "a hydra with many heads". Moltke reported to Ribbentrop that most Spanish officials were pro-Axis who considered the Third Reich to be a friend of Spain and admired the Nazi "crusade against Bolshevism". However, he also noted that Spain was entirely dependent upon imports of American oil, which gave the American embassy a degree of influence in Madrid that tempered the pro-Axis feelings of the Spanish government. When Moltke had arrived in Spain, the German government had already abandoned the hope of Spain entering the war for the Axis, and his instructions from Ribbentrop were to merely to encourage Spain to resist demands from the Allies.

In Spain, his principal concern was in ensuring that the Blue Division, which General Franco had sent to fight on the Eastern Front, remained there. Spain had leaned towards a very pro-Axis neutrality for much of the war. In 1941, Franco had sent the Blue Division to join Operation Barbarossa, the "crusade against Bolshevism". The act violated Spain's status as a neutral power. However, by early 1943, it was becoming clear that the Axis powers were losing the war, and Franco was considering recalling the Blue Division to curry favour with the Allies. The heavy losses taken by the Blue Division, which was down to 12, 000 men by early 1943, made retaining the Blue Division militarily difficult, as its losses could not be replaced by volunteers alone. Both the American and the British governments reduced oil and food shipments to Spain, a form of economic pressure that placed serious strains on the Spanish economy, as Spain lacked oil and needed food imports to feed its people. Both the Americans and the British made it clear that as long as Spain was in effect at war against the Soviet Union by keeping the Blue Division on the Eastern Front, there was no possibility of allowing more food and oil to be imported into Spain.

Moltke tried to cut down the parallel diplomacy carried out by other branches of the German state to make the Auswärtiges Amt preeminent in Spanish policy. Moltke was worried that the impeding visit of Jose Luis Arrese, the secretary-general of the Falange, to the Reich was to be used as an attempt by some of his rivals to bring Spain into the war. He opposed that effort under the grounds that it was destined to fail. Moltke wrote in his diary: "The fear of losing the war may goad the German government into taking desperate decisions". Believing that something dangerous was being planned, Moltke worked with Spanish Foreign Minister Francisco Gómez-Jordana to ensure that Arrese's visit was as banal as possible. The visit of Arrese proved to be an anticlimax since despite Ribbentrop's hopes, Hitler did not demand Spain's entry into the war during his meeting with Arrese on 19 January 1943.

The Spanish historian Emilio Sáenz-Francés summarised the situation: "It is no wonder that professional diplomats such as von Stohrer and von Moltke despaired of Nazi policymaking. While it may be true that Hitler had no intention of invading Spain in the winter of 1942/3, and that his military calculations in relation to the Peninsula were only pre-emptive, the increasingly chaotic nature of Nazi policy meant that it was within the realms of the possible that German military intervention might have been provoked by his subordinates' fondness for radical, aggressive 'National Socialist' solutions to the Spanish 'problem'. The hope of these parallel channels was to open a rift in the already complex relations between Spain and the Axis. Such an eventuality, it was hoped, might catch the eye of their powerful master, and could then be used to boost their own position within the Nazi hierarchy at the expense of any rational course of action in relation to Franco's regime".

On 23 January 1943, Moltke formally presented his credentials to Franco. At their first meeting, Moltke demanded for Franco to give him a written promise that he would never recall the Blue Division, which Franco refused. Moltke's first order of business was in negotiating with Gómez-Jordana the details of an agreement, which had been reached by his predecessor, Stohrer, that Spain would trade more wolfram, a metal crucial for making armour-piecing shells, in exchange for more German arms. During the talks, Moltke sought a promise from Gómez-Jordana that any Allied landing in Spain, including the Canary Islands and Spanish Morocco, would be a casus belli, which Gómez-Jordana refused to make. Moltke was concerned that the situation in Portugal's colonies in Asia in which the Japanese had occupied East Timor and Macau without a Portuguese protest, let alone a declaration of war, had created a precedent in which Spain might likewise accept an Allied occupation of the Canary Islands and/or Spanish Morocco. On 29 January 1943, Franco gave Moltke a written promise that the German-Spanish economic agreement would contain a secret clause committing Spain to enter the war if the Allies tried to seize either the Canary Islands or Spanish Morocco.

Another major concern in German-Spanish relations was the status of the Sephardim, Spanish-descended Jews, in the Greek city of Thessaloniki. In 1492, all of the Sephardim who refused conversion to Catholicism had been expelled from Spain, and some refugees were allowed in the Ottoman Empire. Many of the Sephardim settled in the Balkans, especially in Thessaloniki, which was conquered by the Greeks in 1912, during the First Balkan War. On 20 December 1924, Spanish law was amended to allow the Sephardim to claim Spanish citizenship if that they could prove that their ancestors had lived in Spain prior to 1492. In 1941, when Germany occupied Greece, 49, 000 Sephardim lived in Thessaloniki, and about 600 had taken Spanish citizenship. On 21 January 1943, Moltke gave Gómez-Jordana a demarche that Spain had until 31 March 1943 to evacuate all Jews holding Spanish citizenship from Greece. As Molkte knew very well, the Spanish government was loath to consider the idea of the descendants of the Jews expelled from Spain in 1492 being allowed to return and that it preferred them to live somewhere else. An Aktion was planned against the Jews of Thessaloniki to deport the entire community to Auschwitz in March 1943, and Moltke's note was the diplomatic prelude to force the Spanish to choose to accept the Jews with Spanish citizenship or to be silent.

On 26 January 1943, Moltke gave Gómez-Jordana another note: "After the deadline of 31 March, it will not be possible for the German Authorities to continue the special treatment hitherto granted to the Jews of Spanish nationality". The Spanish position was generally to refuse entry visas for the Sephardim of Thessaloniki or elsewhere and instead to encourage the Sephardim to flee to Turkey. Spanish diplomats were well aware that "resettlement in the East" meant the extermination of the Jewish community of Thessaloniki and in general adopted a "passive" response. Sáenz-Francés wrote that Franco's "feeble policy and hesitation in the first months of 1943" led to the extermination of most of the Jewish community of Thessaloniki in 1943.

On 6 February 1943, Moltke was awakened from his sleep by an urgent phone call from Krahmer, the air attaché at the embassy, that he; the naval attaché; and Captain Lenz, the Abwehr chief in Spain, were waiting for him in his office. Upon arriving, Moltke was met with a scene of much apprehension, as he was informed that Swiss radio had just announced that Franco had gone to Lisbon to meet Winston Churchill, which was taken as meaning from Spain was moving from a pro-Axis neutrality to a more pro-Allied neutrality. Churchill had just visited Turkey to meet President İsmet İnönü in an unsuccessful attempt to have Turkey enter the war for the Allies and so the possibility that Churchill had stopped in Lisbon on his way home to London was felt to be quite realistic. The apparent news that Franco had gone to Lisbon to see Churchill without first informing the German embassy was seen as a sign that Spain was moving away from the Axis.

As it was, the report on Swiss radio turned out to be false. According to the memoirs of the press attaché, Hans Lazar:

"Herr von Moltke took me by the arm to the small sofa of that tastelessly decorated room.
'Sit down', he told me.
'What sort of spectacle is this?'
'What would have happened if you had sent the information included in the [Swiss] report to the Auswärtiges Amt?' I asked him.
'The troops would have crossed the border'.
'If you consider it reasonable that Spain is to be forced to enter in the war against her will, using a fabricated motive, I pledge you to dismiss me. If not, I am here at your disposal'.
This meant a radical change in my relations with von Moltke, [and the incident provided] the basis of a close relationship similar to the one I had with von Stohrer".

Moltke's diary does not support Lazar's claim of a key role in defusing the crisis, but it shows that he was quite convinced that the Swiss report had originated with his rivals within the German government who were trying to provoke an invasion of Spain. Moltke wrote in his diary on 6 February:

"It was necessary to know Berlin's mentality to understand the situation. The main question was this: is this maneuver directed and controlled by Adolf Hitler himself? This was the key question because in the Austrian Invasion [sic], the Czechoslovakia crisis, in the Poland invasion all obeyed to a plan devised by Hitler himself. It was him who gave orders to the Ministry of Foreign Affairs, to the Chief of the Counterespionage service, to the generals because in these cases he knew well what he wanted. He knew those countries, or at least he believed he knew them. If in any of these occasions a dilemma like the one we had now had presented itself, it would have been nonsense to recommend prudence. But in the Spanish case everything was different. Here Hitler hesitates, he does not have a fixed plan. He hesitated at Hendaye in October 1940 when he did not take any decision. He hesitated on 8 November 1942, allowing the war in Africa to continue without taking the initiative. It is probable that he hesitates today. This was the weak point of the conspiracy...Non-confirmed information coming from a radio station could not cause an invasion".

On 10 February 1943, Moltke signed the final version of the German-Spanish agreement committing Spain to keep supplying Germany with wolfram in exchange for more arms. Moltke's rivals saw the agreement as a defeat, as it did not commit Spain to entering the war. In an attempt to undermine the agreement, Johannes Bernhardt, the chief of the Four-Year Plan organisation in Spain, proposed for the wartime costs of wolfram to be factored into the price of arms sold to Spain, which would meant that the Reich would charge the Spanish prices at 400% of their 1939 value. Bernhardt's gambit met with success, and the Spanish complained bitterly of the sudden increases in the price of the weapons that they were hoping to buy. The Spanish purchased only a small faction of what they were hoping to buy and in 1945 had only 24 tanks and 25 aircraft, instead of the hundreds that they were expecting to buy. Despite the way that the Spanish were being overcharged for the weapons that they were buying, they continued to supply Germany with all of the wolfram that it needed. Franco felt a strong debt to the Third Reich because of the German intervention in the Spanish Civil War, which he was determined to repay by supplying the Reich with as much wolfram as possible. Only an Anglo-American threat to impose a total oil embargo on Spain in February 1944 finally forced Franco to curtail the sale of wolfram to the Reich.

Moltke did not alter the flood of Nazi propaganda issued by the embassy, which in fact was one of the central purposes of the Madrid embassy. The press attaché at the embassy, Hans Lazar, spent an average of 175,000 pesetas per month to bribe Spanish journalists into writing pro-Axis articles. The propaganda was not intended to influence Spain but also Latin America, as Moltke noted in his diary that Spain was seen as the bridgehead for projecting Axis influence into Latin America. On 25 February 1943, an inspection of the Madrid embassy was carried out by Gustav Adolf Scheel, the Gauleiter of Salzburg. Moltke wrote in his diary that he was pleased that Scheel was learning that the "blue Spain" that was eager to enter the war that existed in his mind did not exist.

On 11 March 1943, Moltke was one of the guests of honor at the opening of the Hispano-German Centre in Madrid, which was intended to promote closer ties. Moltke believed that the visit of SS-Obergruppenführer Werner Lorenz to Madrid to give a speech at the opening of the Hispano-German Centre was a part of a plot and wrote in his diary:

"It is unlikely that Herr Lorenz is coming to Spain to find scattered Visigoths for a [Wafen-SS] armored division. Rather, the SS are going to play their card!.. Behind this [Walther Friedrich] Schellenberg [SS Standartenführer and counter-intelligence expert] is pulling the strings.... We have to think so, as Himmler does nothing about Spain without agreeing it first with Schellenberg...up to now he has advised Himmler to wait and watch how others discredit themselves with their handling of the complex Spanish issue. But if Himmler... advises [Hitler] to invade Spain, this would be an irrevocable decision".

However, the visit passed without incident, as Lorenz accepted Moltke's argument that a moderately pro-Axis Spain would was more useful to the Reich than invading Spain. Sáenz-Francés wrote that Moltke, despite his short time in Spain, had crucially changed German-Spanish relations by cutting out the other branches of the Nazi Party and the German state to ensure that Auswärtiges Amt was the primary conduct of relations with Spain in a manner that was rational in its assessment of the country. Moltke felt it was hopeless to pressure Franco to enter the war but was content have Spain continue its role as the supplier of key raw materials to Germany, which he argued was the best that could be obtained during the current state of the war. Sáenz-Francés wrote:

"Of course, the key obstacle in any scheme to provoke German intervention in Spain was Adolf Hitler himself, and his fixation with the Eastern Front. Nonetheless, the chaotic Darwinist character of Nazi policymaking provided these parallel channels with political space within which to advance conspiracies relating to the belief that they were 'working towards the Führer'. Their plans, in the context of the war of nerves provoked by Operation Torch and the subsequent intense scrutiny of Spanish actions by the belligerents in the winter of 1942/3 could have had dramatic consequences. It seems plausible to suggest therefore that the replacement of von Stohrer, a vastly experienced observer of Spanish affairs, with von Moltke, who had little previous knowledge of Spain in December 1942, was intended to minimize any opposition to more radical approaches to Spanish relations. Unfortunately for these parallel channels, von Moltke's determination to continue the cautious policy of his predecessor prevented rather clumsily organized plots from turning into something more threatening".

== Death and legacy ==
On 16 March 1943, he attended a session of the Cortes and complained of pain in his belly. On 22 March 1943, Moltke died after a botched appendix operation at the prestigious Ruber Clinic in Madrid. His sudden death provoked rumours of him being poisoned.

When the Polish historian Waclaw Lednicki, who had known Moltke in Warsaw, sent a letter expressing condolences to his widow, she wrote back that she did not accept the official version of his death. After the war, Moltke's son, Gebhardt von Moltke, had his father's body exhumed and an autopsy performed, and no evidence was found of foul play. In an interview in June 2006, Gebhardt von Moltke denied that his father had been murdered. On 26 March 1943, a train left Madrid to take Moltke's corpse back to be buried in the Moltke family crypt in Breslau (now Wrocław, Poland).

== Reputation today ==
Most recently, Moltke came to widespread attention when the Russian president Vladimir Putin in a 2019 essay cited a cable issued by him on 1 October 1938, where he quoted Beck as having "expressed real gratitude for the loyal treatment accorded Polish interests at the Munich conference, as well as the sincerity of relations during the Czech conflict. The attitude of the Führer and Chancellor was fully appreciated by the government and the public." Putin used Moltke's dispatch to argue that Poland was complicit with Nazi Germany's policy of expansionism with the implication that the German-Soviet non-aggression pact of 1939 partitioning Poland was not so outrageous. Putin appeared to be attacking the image of Poland as a victim in the Second World War as he seemed to be suggesting that the Polish regime was an ally of the Third Reich, at least for a time.

The Russian historian Sergey Radchencko argued that Putin was placing undue weight on Moltke's dispatch, as Beck naturally wanted to have Poland appear in the best possible light in Germany when he was talking to the German ambassador, especially when it came to asserting Poland's claim to Teschen. Radchencko noted that Putin cited no Polish diplomatic documents in his essay when it came to the Czechoslovak crisis (Putin cited Polish military documents relating to plans for a possible war with Czechoslovakia) and that in fact, Beck kept his options open during the Sudetenland crisis as he was prepared to fight against Germany in 1938 under certain conditions. Radchencko criticised as unfair the condemning of Polish foreign policy during the 1938 crisis so harshly on the basis of one dispatch, which was written by Moltke and summarised the views of the Polish foreign minister, who had a vested interest in improving relations with Germany.

== Genealogy ==
Descended from the old Mecklenburg noble family of Moltke, he was the grandson of the Prussian district administrator Adolph von Moltke (1804–1871), who was a brother of Field Marshal Helmuth von Moltke and the son of Royal Prussian Minister of State and Oberpräsident Friedrich von Moltke (1852–1927).

Moltke married Davida Yorck von Wartenberg (24 September 1900 – 26 September 1989) on 8 June 1926.

The couple had eight children :

- Monika von Moltke (1927–1948)
- Maria von Moltke (born 1929)
- Friedrich von Moltke (1931–2018), Bank Manager
- Heinrich von Moltke (born 1933), Director General for Enterprise Policy at the European Commission
- Wulf von Moltke (born 1935), Senior Executive Vice President
- Gebhardt von Moltke (1938–2019), among others, German Ambassador in London
- Angelika Baroness von Hahn (born 1940), professor of Neurology at the University of Western Ontario, London, Ontario
- Renate von Dobschütz (born 1942), art historian, married to Leonard von Dobschütz.

== Books and articles ==
- Avni, Haim; Abui, Hajjim; Shimoni, Emanuel (1982). Spain, the Jews, and Franco. New York: Jewish Publication Society of America. ISBN 9780827601888.
- Bowen, Wayne H. (2000). Spaniards and Nazi Germany Collaboration in the New Order. Columbia: University of Missouri Press. ISBN 9780826262820.
- Bowen, Wayne (2006). Spain During World War II. Columbia: University of Missouri Press. ISBN 9780826265159.
- Cecil, Lamar (2015). The German Diplomatic Service, 1871–1914. Princeton: Princeton University Press. ISBN 9781400867707.
- Emerson, J.T. (1977). The Rhineland Crisis, 7 March 1936: A Critical Study in Multilateral Diplomacy. London: Temple Smith. ISBN 085117096X.
- Fink, Carole (2006). Defending the Rights of Others The Great Powers, the Jews, and International Minority Protection, 1878–1938. Cambridge: Cambridge University Press. ISBN 9780521029940.
- Hargreaves, Richard (2010). Blitzkrieg Unleashed: The German Invasion of Poland 1939. Mechanicsburg: Stackpole Books. ISBN 978-0811707244.
- Herwig, Holger (1996). "Clio Deceived: Patriotic Self-Censorship in Germany after the Great War". In Keith Wilson (ed.). Forging the Collective Memory Government and International Historians Through Two World Wars. Oxford: Berghahn Books. pp. 87–127. ISBN 9781571819284.
- Huener, Jonathan (2021). The Polish Catholic Church Under German Occupation: The Reichsgau Wartheland, 1939–1945. Bloomington: Indiana University Press. ISBN 978-0253054036.
- Jacobsen, Hans-Adolf (1999). "The Structure of Nazi Foreign Policy 1933–1945". In Christian Leitz (ed.). The Third Reich The Essential Readings. London: Blackwell. pp. 49–94.
- Kaillis, Aristotle (2000). Fascist Ideology. London: Routledge.
- Kleinfeld, Gerald; Tambs, Lewis (2014). Hitler's Spanish Legion The Blue Division in Russia in WWII. Mechanicsburg: Stackpole.
- Kunicki, Mikolaj (2001). "Unwanted Collaborators: Leon Kozłowski, Władysław Studnicki, and the Problem of Collaboration among the Polish Conservative Politicians in World War II". European Review of History. 8 (2): 203–220. doi:10.1080/13507480120074260. S2CID 144137847.
- Melzer, Emanuel (1997). No Way Out The Politics of Polish Jewry 1935–1939. New York: Hebrew Union College Press. ISBN 9780878201419.
- Penalba-Sotorrıo, Mercedes (2019). "Beyond the War: Nazi Propaganda Aims in Spain during the Second World War". Journal of Contemporary History. 54 (4): 902–926. doi:10.1177/0022009418761214. S2CID 166137112.
- Pinkus, Oscar (2005). The War Aims and Strategies of Adolf Hitler. Jefferson: McFarland. ISBN 9780786420544.
- Pike, David (2008). Franco and the Axis Stigma. London: Palgrave Macmillan. ISBN 9780230205444.
- Röhl, John (1994). The Kaiser and his Court. Cambridge: Cambridge University Press.
- Sáenz-Francés, Emilio (2009). ""Not to be shown to researchers": Spanish Foreign Policy towards the Deportation of the Spanish Sephardic Community of Salonica in 1943". In Matjaž Klemenčič and Mary N. Harris (ed.). European migrants, diasporas and indigenous ethnic minorities. Pisa: PLUS-University Press. pp. 211–234. ISBN 9788884926531.
- Sáenz-Francés, Emilio (March 2013). "The Ambassadorship of Hans Adolf von Moltke (1943): The Turning Point in German–Spanish Relations during the Second World War". German History. 31 (1): 23–41. doi:10.1093/gerhis/ghs124.
- Shirer, William (1960). The Rise and Fall of the Third Reich. New York: Simon and Schuster.
- Schmelzer, Albert (2017). The Threefolding Movement, 1919 A History : Rudolf Steiner's Campaign for a Self-governing, Self-managing, Self-educating Society. Forest Row: Rudolf Steiner Press. ISBN 9781855845411.
- Watt, D.C. (1989). How War Came The Immediate Origins of the Second World War, 1938–1939. London: Pantheon Books. ISBN 9780679730934.
- Stercho, Peter George (1971). Diplomacy of Double Morality Europe's Crossroads in Carpatho-Ukraine, 1919–1939. Ocala: Carpathian Research Center.
- Tooley, T. Hunt (1997). National Identity and Weimar Germany Upper Silesia and the Eastern Border, 1918–1922. Lincoln: University of Nebraska Press. ISBN 9780803244290.
- Wiaderny, Bernard (2016). Hans-Adolf von Moltke Eine politische Biographie. Paderborn: Ferdinand Schöningh. ISBN 9783657784486.
- Weinberg, Gerhard (1980). The Foreign Policy of Hitler's Germany : Starting World War II 1937–39. Chicago: University of Chicago Press. ISBN 0391038265.
- Weinberg, Gerhard (2010). Hitler's Foreign Policy, 1933–1939 The Road to World War II. New York: Enigma Books. ISBN 9781929631278.
- Mitcham, Samuel W. (2008). The Rise of the Wehrmacht The German Armed Forces and World War II. Westport: Praeger Security International. ISBN 978-0275996413.
