= 1921 Upper Silesia plebiscite =

Voting regarding the German–Polish border

- 20 March 1921
- Outcome: Upper Silesia is divided. East Upper Silesia goes to Poland. West Upper Silesia goes to Germany.

Results
Choice	Votes	%
Germany	707,393	59.61%
Poland	479,365	40.39%

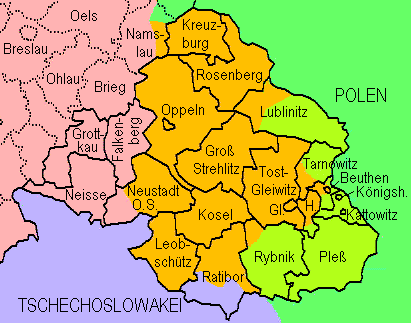
Map of the plebiscite areas Pink = Germany Green = Poland Lilac = Czechoslovakia (including, without plebiscite, Hlučín) Pale green = to Poland following plebiscite Orange = remaining in Germany following plebiscite

The Upper Silesia plebiscite was a plebiscite mandated by the Versailles Treaty and carried out on 20 March 1921 to determine ownership of the province of Upper Silesia between Weimar Germany and the Second Polish Republic. The region was ethnically mixed with both Germans and Poles. According to prewar statistics, ethnic Poles formed 60 percent of the population.

Under the previous rule by the German Empire, Poles claimed they had faced discrimination and had been effectively second-class citizens. The period of the plebiscite campaign and the Allied occupation was marked by violence. Three Polish uprisings occurred, and German volunteer paramilitary units came to the region.

The area was policed by French, British and Italian troops and overseen by an Interallied Commission. The Allies planned a partition of the region, but a Polish insurgency took control of over half the area. The Germans responded with the Freikorps, volunteer paramilitary units from all over Germany that fought the Polish units. The Freikorps from all over Germany participated in the plebiscite, as well as other bussed-in Germans. In the end, after renewed Allied military intervention, the final position of the opposing forces became, roughly, the new border. The decision was handed over to the League of Nations, which confirmed the border, and Poland received roughly one third of the plebiscite zone by area, including the greater part of the industrial region.

After the referendum, a conference of ambassadors in Paris on 20 October 1921 decided to divide the region. Consequently, the German-Polish Accord on East Silesia (Geneva Convention), a minority treaty, was concluded on 15 May 1922 and dealt with the constitutional and legal future of Upper Silesia, which had partly become Polish territory.

== Ethnolinguistic structure before the plebiscite ==
Language situation in Silesia in 1905-06

The earliest exact census figures on ethnolinguistic or national structure (Nationalverschiedenheit) of the Prussian part of Upper Silesia, come from 1819. Polish immigration from Galicia, Congress Poland and Prussian provinces into Upper Silesia during the 19th century was a major factor in their increasing numbers. The last Prussian general census figures available are from 1910 (if not including the 1911 census of school children – Sprachzählung unter den Schulkindern – which revealed a higher percent of Polish-speakers among school children than the 1910 census among the general populace). Figures (Table 1.) show that large demographic changes took place between 1819 and 1910, with the region's total population quadrupling, the percent of Germans increasing significantly, while Polish-speakers maintained their steady increasing numbers. Also the total land area in which Polish was spoken, as well as the land area in which it was spoken, declined between 1790 and 1890. Polish authors before 1918 estimated the number of Poles in Prussian Upper Silesia as slightly higher than according to official German censuses. The three western districts of Falkenberg (Niemodlin), Grottkau (Grodków) and Neisse (Nysa), though part of Regierungsbezirk Oppeln, were not included in the plebiscite area, as they were almost entirely populated by Germans.

Table 1. Numbers of Polish, German and other inhabitants (Regierungsbezirk Oppeln)
Year	1819	1828	1831	1834	1837	1840	1843	1846	1852	1855	1858	1861	1867	1890	1900	1905	1910
Polish	377,100 (67.2%)	418,837 (61.1%)	443,084 (62.0%)	468,691 (62.6%)	495,362 (62.1%)	525,395 (58.6%)	540,402 (58.1%)	568,582 (58.1%)	584,293 (58.6%)	590,248 (58.7%)	612,849 (57.3%)	665,865 (59.1%)	742,153 (59.8%)	918,728 (58.2%)	1,048,230 (56.1%)	1,158,805 (57.0%)	Census, monolingual Polish: 1,169,340 (53.0%) or up to 1,560,000 together with bilinguals
German	162,600 (29.0%)	255,483 (37.3%)	257,852 (36.1%)	266,399 (35.6%)	290,168 (36.3%)	330,099 (36.8%)	348,094 (37.4%)	364,175 (37.2%)	363,990 (36.5%)	366,562 (36.5%)	406,950 (38.1%)	409,218 (36.3%)	457,545 (36.8%)	566,523 (35.9%)	684,397 (36.6%)	757,200 (37.2%)	884,045 (40.0%)
Other	21,503 (3.8%)	10,904 (1.6%)	13,254 (1.9%)	13,120 (1.8%)	12,679 (1.6%)	41,570 (4.6%)	42,292 (4.5%)	45,736 (4.7%)	49,445 (4.9%)	48,270 (4.8%)	49,037 (4.6%)	51,187 (4.6%)	41,611 (3.4%)	92,480 (5.9%)	135,519 (7.3%)	117,651 (5.8%)	Total population: 2,207,981

== The plebiscite ==
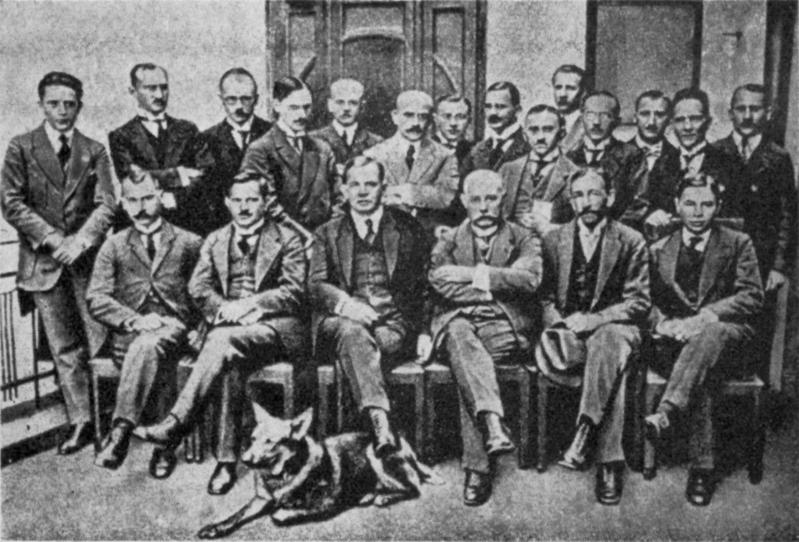
Members of the Polish Plebiscite Committee

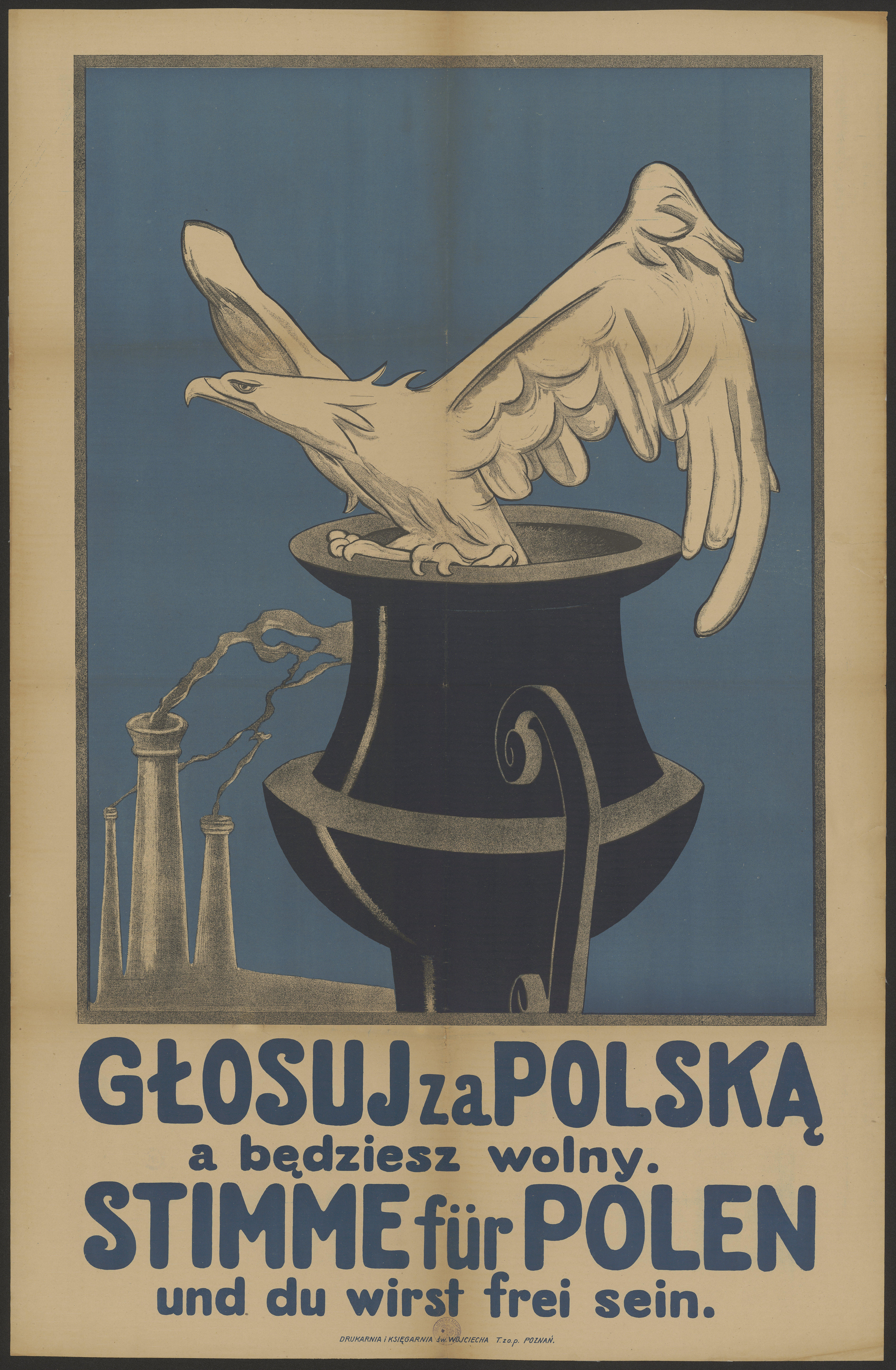
A bilingual Polish Propaganda poster: Vote for Poland and you will be free

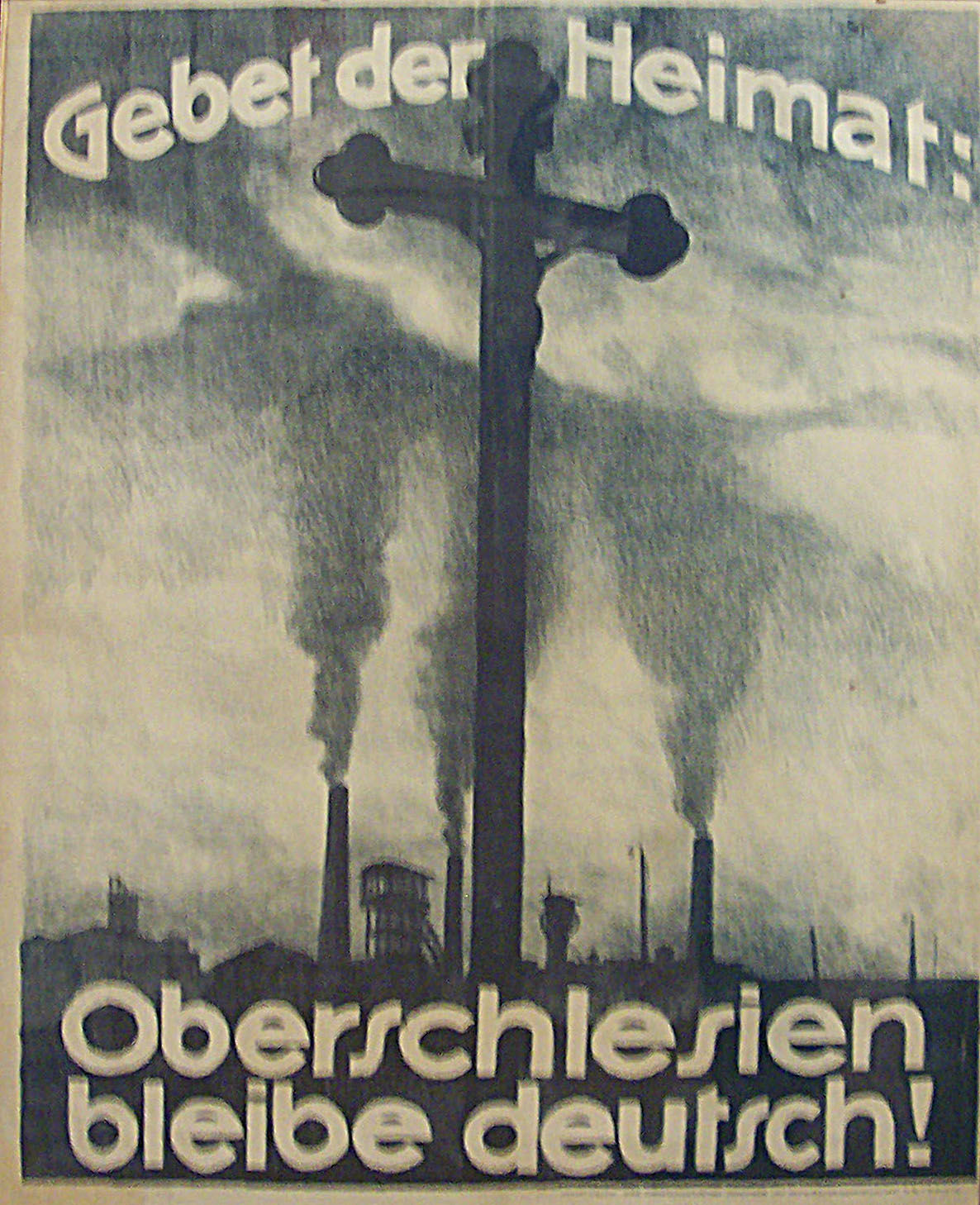
A German Propaganda poster: Prayer of the Homeland: Upper Silesia remain German!

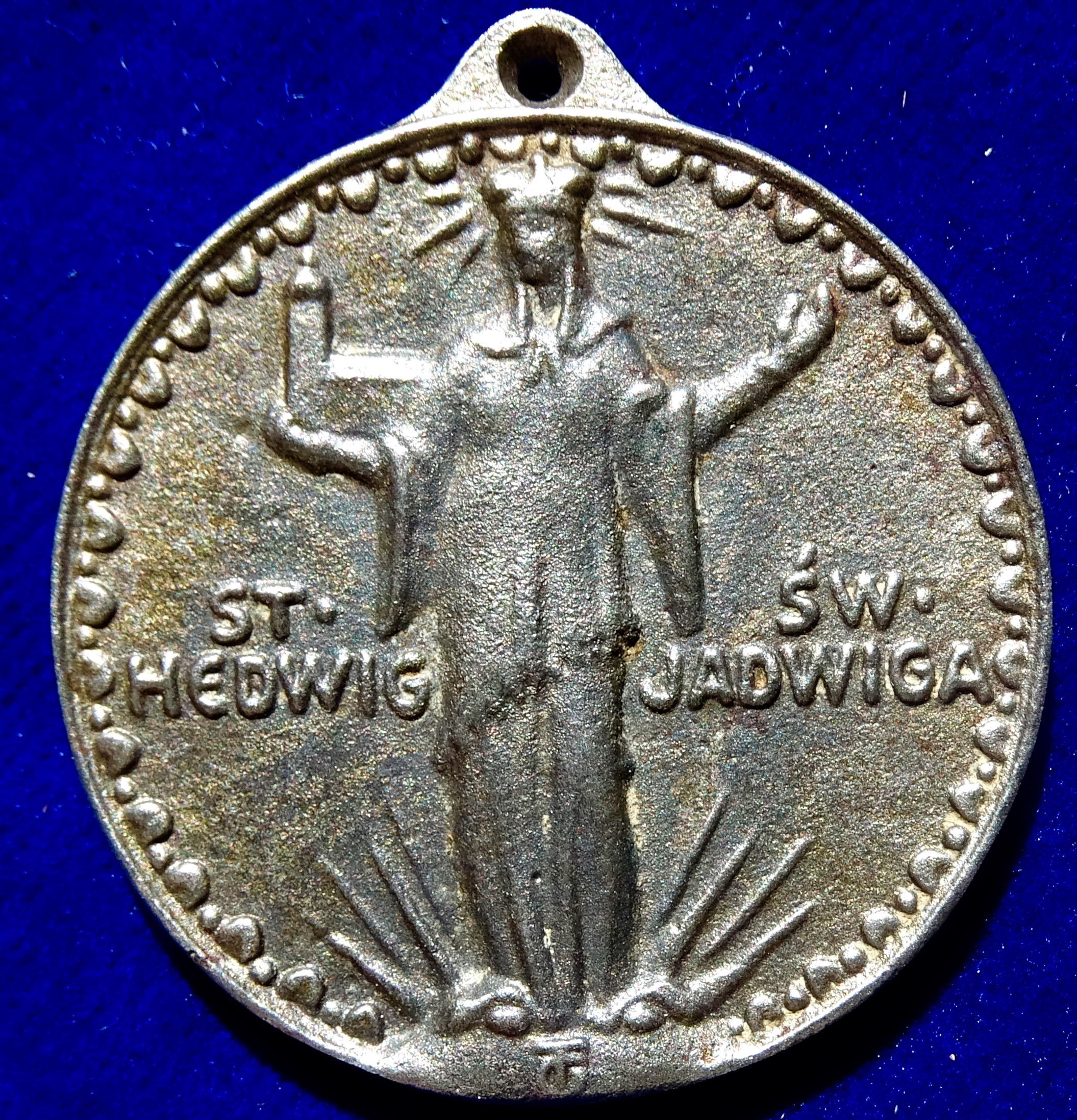
Upper Silesia Plebiscite 1921 cast iron campaign medal of the pro- German side. The obverse shows the Bavarian born Saint Hedwig of Silesia.

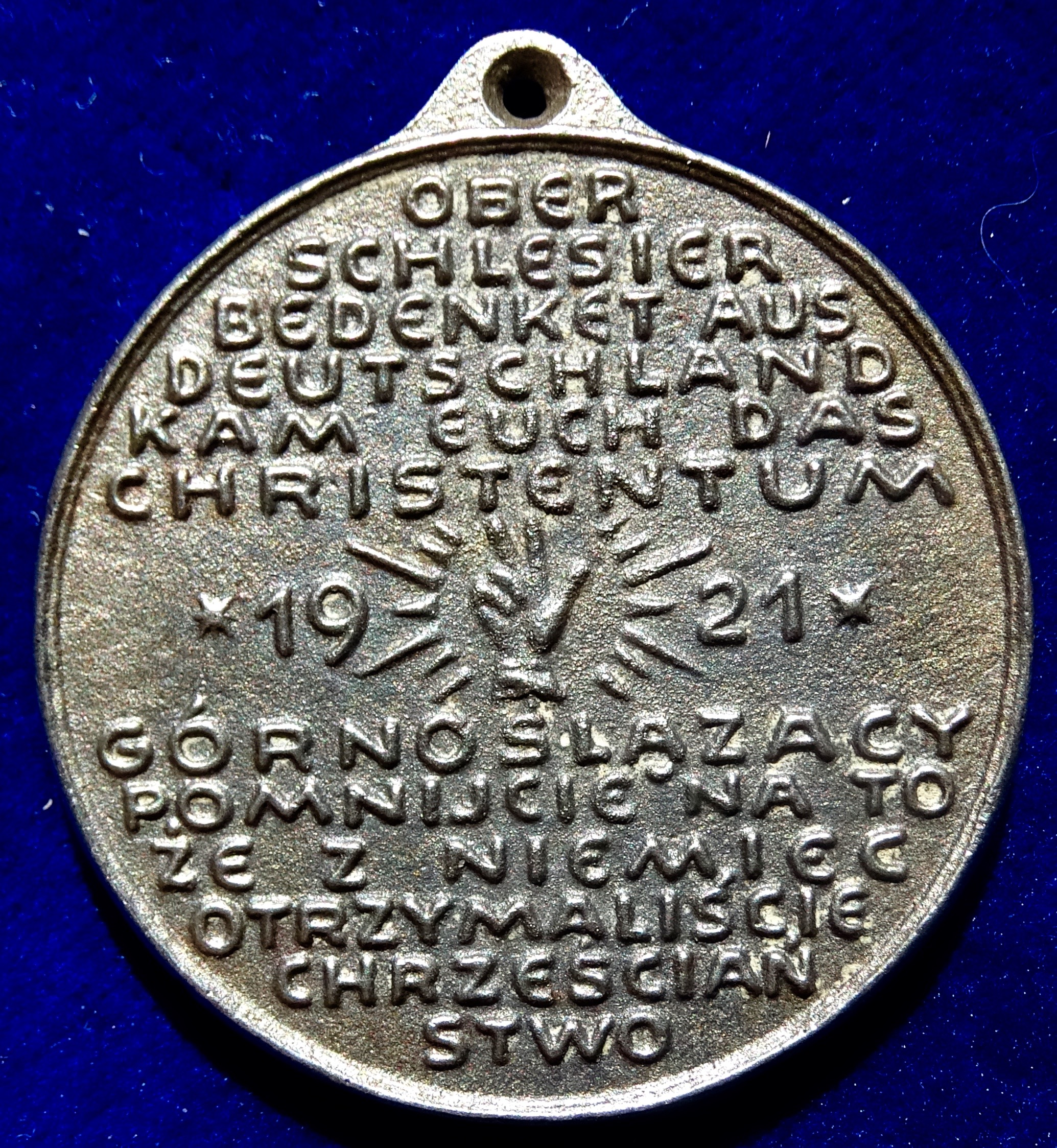
The reverse of this medal states in German and Polish the German origin of the Upper Silesian Christianisation.

The Paris Peace Conference at the end of the First World War placed some formerly German territory in neighbouring countries, some of which had not existed before the war. In the case of the new Second Polish Republic, the Treaty of Versailles established some 54,000 square kilometrs of formerly-German territory as part of the newly independent Poland. Many of these areas were ethnically mixed. In three of the ethnically mixed areas on the new German-Polish border, however, the Allied leaders provided for border plebiscites or referendums. The areas would be occupied by Allied forces and governed to some degree by Allied commissions.

The most significant of those plebiscites was the one in Upper Silesia since the region was a principal industrial centre. The most important economic asset was the enormous coal-mining industry and its ancillary businesses, but the area yielded iron, zinc, and lead. The "Industrial Triangle", on the eastern side of the plebiscite zone, between the cities of Beuthen (Bytom), Kattowitz (Katowice), and Gleiwitz (Gliwice) was the heart of this large industrial complex. The Upper Silesia plebiscite was therefore a plebiscite for self-determination of Upper Silesia required by the Treaty of Versailles. Both Germany and Poland valued the region not only for reasons of national feeling but also for its economic importance.

The area was occupied by British, French, and Italian forces, and an Interallied Committee headed by a French general, Henri Le Rond. The plebiscite was set for 20 March 1921. Both Poles and Germans were allowed to organize campaigns. Each side developed secret paramilitary forces, which were financed from the opposing capitals: Warsaw and Berlin. The major figure of the campaign was Wojciech Korfanty, a pro-Polish politician.

The Poles carried out uprisings during the campaign in August 1919 and August 1920. The Allies restored order in each case, but the Polish insurrectionists clashed with German "volunteers", the Freikorps.

A feature of the plebiscite campaign was the growing prominence of a strong autonomist movement, the most visible branch of which was the Bund der Oberschlesier/Związek Górnoślązaków, an organisation attempted to gain promises of autonomy from both states and possible future independence for Upper Silesia.

There were 1,186,758 votes cast in an area inhabited by 2,073,663 people. They resulted in 717,122 votes being cast for Germany and 483,514 for Poland.

The towns and most of the villages in the plebiscite territory had German majorities. However, the districts of Pless (Pszczyna) and Rybnik in the southeast, as well as Tarnowitz (Tarnowskie Góry) in the east and Tost-Gleiwitz (Gliwice) in the interior showed considerable Polish majorities, while in Lublinitz (Lubliniec) and Groß Strehlitz (Strzelce Opolskie) the votes cast on either side were practically equal. All districts of the industrial zone in a narrower sense – Beuthen (Bytom), Hindenburg (Zabrze), Kattowitz (Katowice), and Königshütte (Chorzów) – had slight German majorities, but in Beuthen and Kattowitz, that was entirely because of the town vote (four fifths in Kattowitz. compared to an overall 60%). Many country communes of Upper Silesia had Polish majorities. Overall, however, the Germans won the vote by a measure of 59.4% to 40.6%. The Interallied Commission deliberated, but the British proposed a more easterly border than the French, which would have given much less of the Industrial Triangle to Poland.

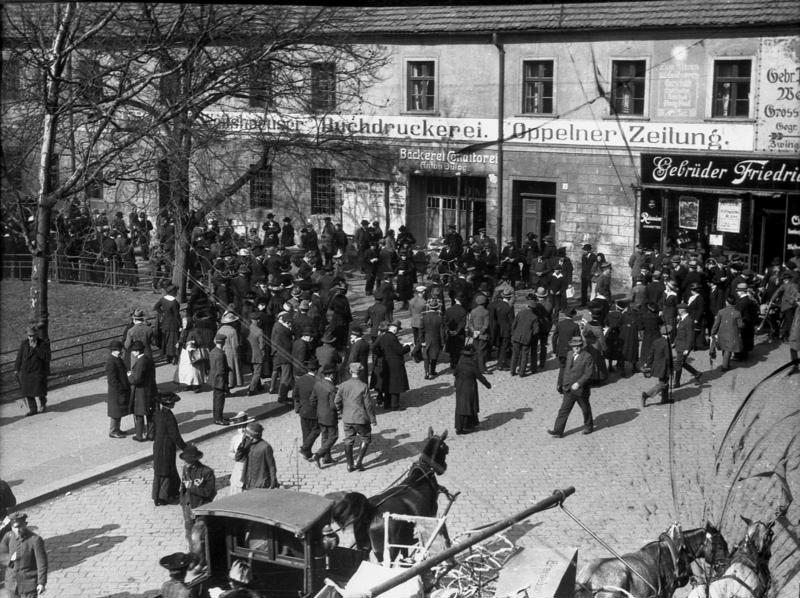
A crowd awaits the plebiscite results in Oppeln (Opole)

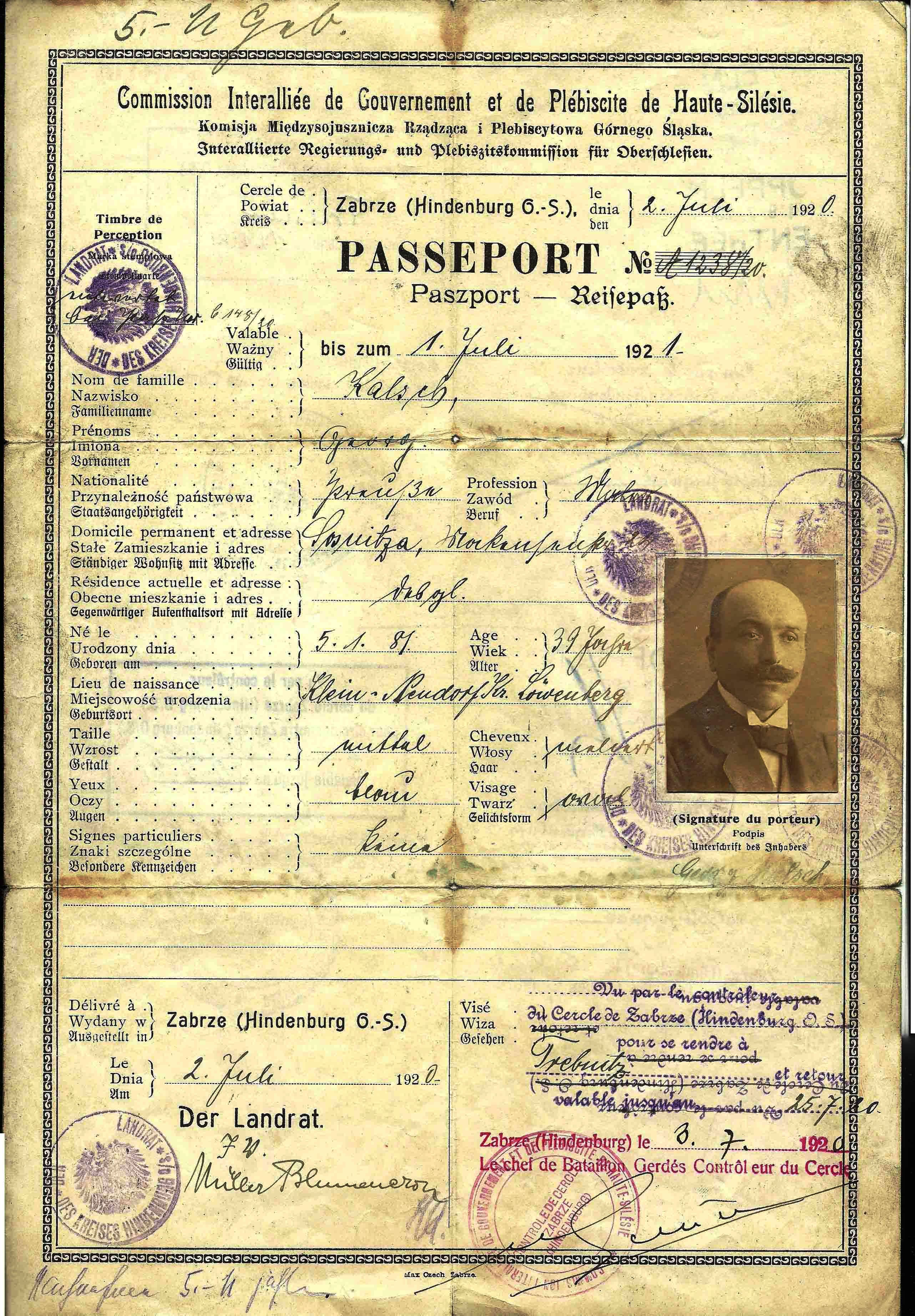
1920 special passport issued to those living in the region during the Upper Silesian plebiscite.

In late April 1921, when pro-Polish forces began to fear that the region would be partitioned according to the British plan, elements on the Polish side announced a popular uprising. Korfanty was the leading figure of the uprising, but he had much support in Upper Silesia and from the Polish government, in Warsaw. Korfanty called for a popular armed uprising, whose aim was to maximize the territory that Poland would receive in the partition. German volunteers rushed to meet this uprising, and large-scale fighting took place in the late spring and early summer of 1921. German-speaking spokesmen and German officials complained that the French units of the Upper Silesian army of occupation supported the insurrection by refusing to put down violent activities or to restore order.

Twelve days after the start of the uprising, Korfanty offered to take his Upper Silesian forces behind a line of demarcation if the released territory was occupied not by German forces but by Allied troops. On 1 July, British troops returned to Upper Silesia to help French forces occupy this area. Simultaneously with those events, the Interallied Commission pronounced a general amnesty for the illegal actions committed during the recent violence except for acts of revenge and cruelty. The German defence force was finally withdrawn.

Because the Allied Supreme Council was unable to come to an agreement on the partition of the Upper Silesian territory on the basis of the confusing plebiscite results, a solution was found by turning the question over to the Council of the League of Nations. Agreements between the Germans and Poles in Upper Silesia and appeals issued by both sides, as well as the dispatch of six battalions of Allied troops and the disbandment of the local guards, contributed markedly to the pacification of the district. On the basis of the reports of a League commission and those of its experts, the Council awarded the greater part of the Upper Silesian industrial district to Poland, which obtained almost exactly half of the 1,950,000 inhabitants (965,000) but not quite a third of the territory (only 3,214.26 km^{2} (1,255 mi^{2}) out of 10,950.89 km^{2} (4,265 mi^{2})) but more than 80% of the heavy industry of the region.

The German and Polish governments, under a League of Nations recommendation, agreed to enforce protections of minority interests that would last for 15 years. Special measures were threatened in case either state refused to participate in the drawing up of such regulations or to accept them subsequently. In the event, the German minority remaining on the Polish side of the border suffered considerable discrimination in the subsequent decades.

The Polish government, convinced by the economic and political power of the region and by the autonomist movement of the plebiscite campaign, decided to give Upper Silesia considerable autonomy, with a Silesian Parliament as a legislature and the Silesian Voivodship Council as the executive body. On the German side the new Prussian province of Upper Silesia (Oberschlesien) with regional government in Oppeln was formed, likewise with special autonomy.

=== Results ===
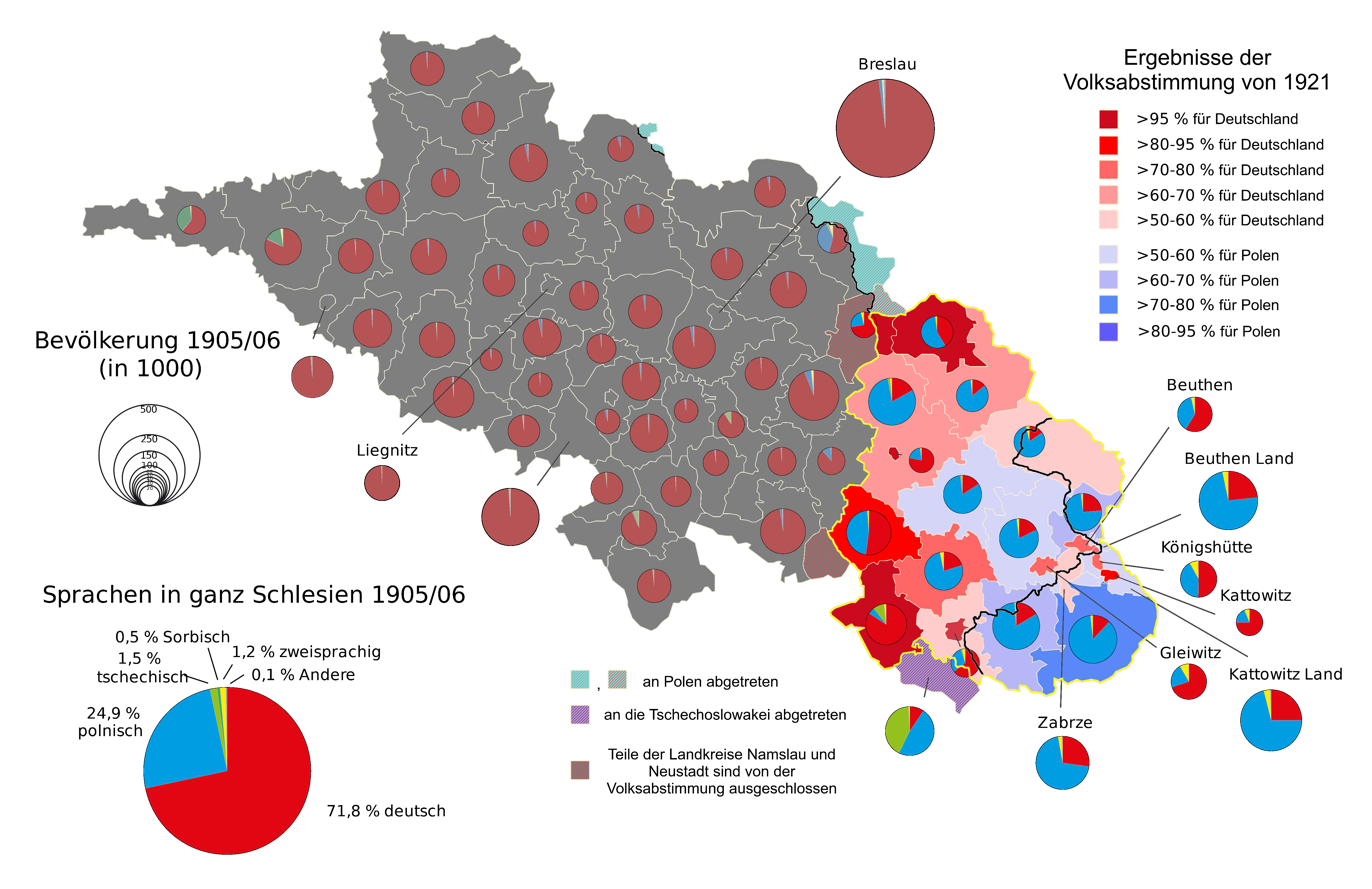
Map of Upper Silesian Plebiscite of 1921

County	population (1919)	registered voters	turnout	votes for Germany	%	votes for Poland	%
Beuthen (Bytom), town	71,187	42,990	39,991	29,890	74.7%	10,101	25.3%
Beuthen (Bytom), district	213,790	109,749	106,698	43,677	40.9%	63,021	59.1%
Cosel (Koźle), district	79,973	51,364	50,100	37,651	75.2%	12,449	24.8%
Gleiwitz (Gliwice), town	69,028	41,949	40,587	32,029	78.9%	8,558	21.1%
Groß Strehlitz (Strzelce Opolskie), district	76,502	46,528	45,461	22,415	49.3%	23,046	50.7%
Hindenburg (Zabrze), district	167,632	90,793	88,480	45,219	51.1%	43,261	48.9%
Kattowitz (Katowice), town	45,422	28,531	26,674	22,774	85.4%	3,900	14.6%
Kattowitz (Katowice), district	227,657	122,342	119,011	52,892	44.4%	66,119	55.6%
Königshütte (Chorzów), town	74,811	44,052	42,628	31,864	74.7%	10,764	25.3%
Kreuzburg (Kluczbork), district	52,558	40,602	39,627	37,975	95.8%	1,652	4.2%
Leobschütz (Głubczyce), district	78,247	66,697	65,387	65,128	99.6%	259	0.4%
Lublinitz (Lubliniec), district	55,380	29,991	29,132	15,453	53.0%	13,679	47.0%
Namslau (Namysłów), district	5,659	5,606	5,481	5,348	97.6%	133	2.4%
Neustadt (Prudnik), district	51,287	36,941	36,093	31,825	88.2%	4,268	11.8%
Oppeln (Opole), town	35,483	22,930	21,914	20,816	95.0%	1,098	5.0%
Oppeln (Opole), district	123,165	82,715	80,896	56,170	69.4%	24,726	30.6%
Pleß (Pszczyna), district	141,828	73,923	72,053	18,675	25.9%	53,378	74.1%
Ratibor (Racibórz), town	36,994	25,336	24,518	22,291	90.9%	2,227	9.1%
Ratibor (Racibórz), district	78,238	45,900	44,867	26,349	58.7%	18,518	41.3%
Rosenberg (Olesno), district	54,962	35,976	35,007	23,857	68.1%	11,150	31.9%
Rybnik, district	160,836	82,350	80,266	27,919	34.8%	52,347	65.2%
Tarnowitz (Tarnowskie Góry), district	86,563	45,561	44,591	17,078	38.3%	27,513	61.7%
Tost-Gleiwitz (Gliwice), district	86,461	48,153	47,296	20,098	42.5%	27,198	57.5%
Total	2,073,663	1,220,979	1,186,758	707,393	59.6%	479,365	40.4%
Total without Namslau district	2,068,004	1,215,373	1,181,277	702,045	59.4%	479,232	40.6%

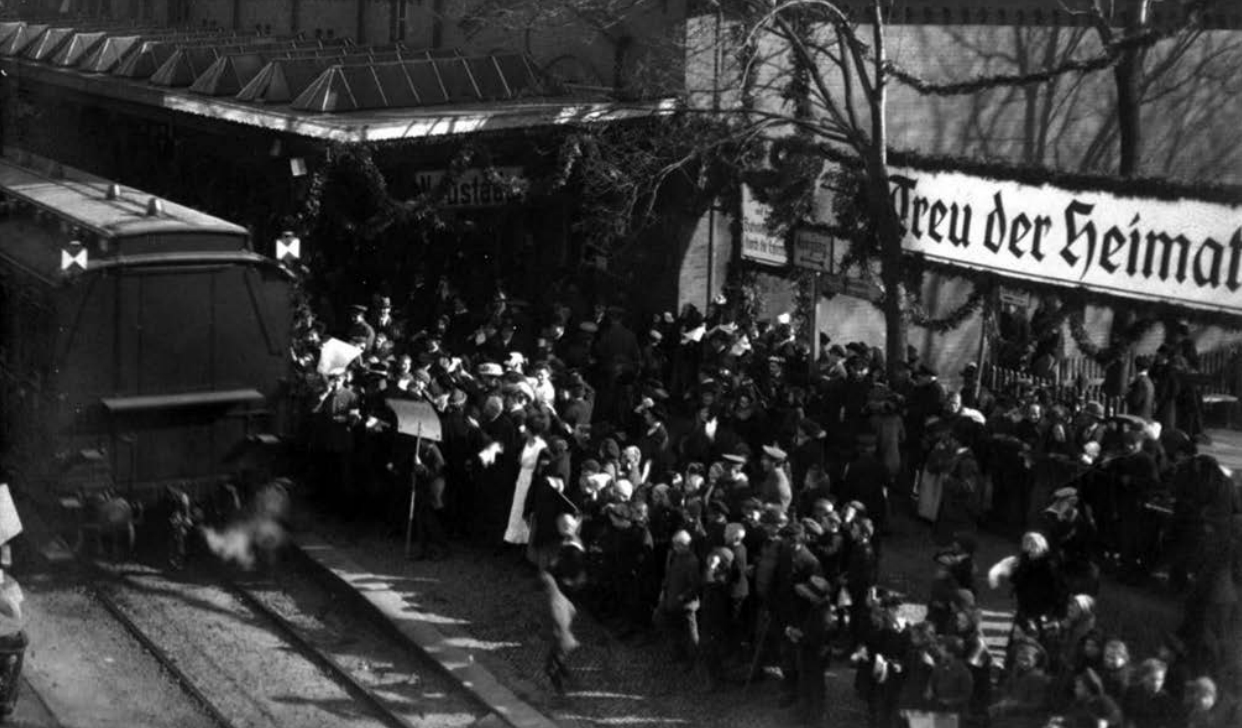
Arrival of the train with migrant workers from western Germany in Neustadt (Prudnik)

According to Article 88 of the Treaty of Versailles all inhabitants of the plebiscite district older than 20 years of age and those who had "been expelled by the German authorities and have not retained their domicile there" were entitled to return to vote.

That stipulation of the Treaty of Versailles allowed the participation of thousands of Upper Silesian migrant workers from western Germany (Ruhrpolen). Hugo Service regards the transport of these eligible voters to Silesia, organized by German authorities, "a cynical act aimed at boosting the German vote" and as one of the reasons for the overall result. As Service writes, although almost 60% of Upper Silesians voted for their region to remain part of Germany, it would be dubious to claim that most of them were ethnically German or regarded themselves as Germans. Voting for Germany in the 1921 vote and regarding oneself as German were two different things. People had diverse, often very pragmatic reasons for voting for Germany, which usually had little to do with regarding themselves as having a German ethnonational identity.

According to Robert Machray, a British international observer, 192,408 of all plebiscite voters were migrants and made up 16% of the total electorate. Among them, 94.7% voted for Germany. There were cases of votes being cast in the name of already deceased persons who died outside of Upper Silesia, and since their deaths were registered "in comparatively inaccessible German registration departments in Central Germany", it was often difficult to detect voter fraud. Additionally, "the general conditions in which the plebiscite was held by no means created an atmosphere for a free and independent vote" since the administration was staffed only by ethnic Germans, and no Polish schools were allowed, which limited Polish cultural life to churches and private organisations. The Polish population of Silesia overwhelmingly consisted of poor workers and small farmers, who owned no real property and were highly dependent on the German authorities to provide appropriate infrastructure. All offices and industries were controlled by the German population, who exerted an overwhelming pressure on Poles to vote for Germany, and they "frequently exceeded their lawful powers and supported many forms of anti-Polish activities".

Demobilised German officers joined the Freikorps and terrorised the Polish population. Machray states, "Upper Silesia was the scene of incessant confusion, sanguinary struggles with armed German attacks on Polish meetings and on the terrorized and defenceless Polish population, especially in the rural areas". Emil Julius Gumbel investigated and condemned the cases of widespread intimidation and murders by Freikorps and Selbstschutz divisions and remarked that “a denunciation, a suspicion without foundation under the given circumstances, was sufficient. The man concerned is fetched from his lodgings and instantly shot... all this only because the man was a Pole or was considered a Pole and worked for union with Poland”. Machray establishes that many Poles were either prevented from voting or intimidated into voting for Germany and notes that in provinces such as Kozle and Olesno, a minority of voters voted for Poland although the areas were overwhelmingly Polish according to the 1910 census, with 75% in Kozle and 81% in Olesno Provinces. Machray concludes that given the aggressive anti-Polish campaign conducted by local authorities and German volunteers, "the results were far from being an objective reflection of the true desires of the oppressed people". The constant ethnic tensions and attacks on Polish voters resulted in the Silesian Uprisings.

=== Comparison of district demographics with voting behaviour ===
The following table compares the percentage of German-speakers (excluding bilinguals) as reported in the 1910 census in each district, with the pro-German vote share registered in the respective district. In almost all districts, the percentage of pro-German votes exceeded the percentage of those who identified as German by almost 25% on average, which suggests that many non-Germans voted in favour of Germany.

District	% of German Population	% of votes for Germany
Beuthen (Bytom), town	60.7%	74.7%
Beuthen (Bytom), district	30.3%	40.9%
Cosel (Koźle), district	21.7%	75.2%
Gleiwitz (Gliwice), town	74.0%	78.9%
Groß Strehlitz (Strzelce Opolskie), district	17.2%	49.3%
Hindenburg (Zabrze), district	40.0%	51.1%
Kattowitz (Katowice), town	85.4%	85.4%
Kattowitz (Katowice), district	30.3%	44.4%
Königshütte (Chorzów), town	54.1%	74.7%
Kreuzburg (Kluczbork), district	46.9%	95.8%
Leobschütz (Głubczyce), district	84.6%	99.6%
Lublinitz (Lubliniec), district	14.7%	53.0%
Namslau (Namysłów), district^{1}	72.5%	97.6%
Neustadt (Prudnik), district^{2}	52.8%	88.2%
Oppeln (Opole), town	80.0%	95.0%
Oppeln (Opole), district	20.1%	69.4%
Pleß (Pszczyna), district	13.4%	25.9%
Ratibor (Racibórz), town	59.6%	90.9%
Ratibor (Racibórz), district^{3}	11.2%	58.7%
Rosenberg (Olesno), district	16.4%	68.1%
Rybnik, district	18.9%	34.8%
Tarnowitz (Tarnowskie Góry), district	27.0%	38.3%
Tost-Gleiwitz (Gliwice), district	20.4%	42.5%
Total	35.7%	59.6%
Total without Namslau district	35.1%	59.4%

The above population percentages refer to the entire area of the respective districts, but in a few cases, only parts of a district were included in the plebiscite a:

^{1} Only a small part of the Namslau district was part of the plebiscite area; 1905 census data was used for the district

^{2} The predominantly German south-western part of the Neustadt district (including the town of Neustadt) was not part of the plebiscite area

^{3} The southern part of the Ratibor district (Hlučín Region) was ceded to Czechoslovakia in 1919 and so was not included in the plebiscite area

== Settlements that voted to secede for Poland ==
In the 1921 plebiscite, 40.6% of eligible voters decided to secede from Germany and become Polish citizens. In total, over 700 towns and villages voted to secede from Germany and become part of Poland, especially in the rural districts of Pszczyna, Rybnik, Tarnowskie Góry, Toszek-Gliwice, Strzelce Opolskie, Bytom, Katowice, Lubliniec, Zabrze, Racibórz, Olesno, Koźle and Opole.

== Division of the region after the plebiscite ==
Division of Prussian Silesia between Weimar Germany, Poland and Czechoslovakia after the First World War
Division of:	Area in 1910 in km^{2}	Share of territory	Population in 1910	After WW1 part of:	Notes
Lower Silesia	27,105 km^{2}	100%	3,017,981	Divided between:	
to Poland	526 km^{2}	2%	1%	Poznań Voivodeship (Niederschlesiens Ostmark)	(Note: After the First World War, Poland received a small part of historical Lower Silesia, with had a mostly-Polish population as of 1918. The area included parts of Syców (German: Polnisch Wartenberg), Namysłów, Góra and Milicz districts. In total, around 526 square kilometres with around 30,000 inhabitants, including the city of Rychtal. Too small to form its own voivodeship, the area was incorporated to Poznań Voivodeship (formerly the Province of Posen).)
to Germany	26,579 km^{2}	98%	99%	Province of Lower Silesia	
Upper Silesia	13,230 km^{2}	100%	2,207,981	Divided between:	
to Poland	3,225 km^{2}	25%	41%	Silesian Voivodeship	(Note: Interwar Silesian Voivodeship was formed from Prussian East Upper Silesia (area 3,225 km^{2}) and Polish part of Austrian Cieszyn Silesia (1,010 km^{2}), in total 4,235 km^{2}. After the annexation of Trans-Olza from Czechoslovakia in 1938, it increased to 5,122 km^{2}. Silesian Voivodeship's capital was Katowice.)
to Czechoslovakia	325 km^{2}	2%	2%	Hlučín Region	
to Germany	9,680 km^{2}	73%	57%	Province of Upper Silesia	

== See also ==
- Territorial changes of Germany after World War I
- Territorial changes of Poland after World War I
- 1920 Schleswig plebiscites
- 1920 East Prussian plebiscite
