= Krzyżowniki =

Krzyżowniki may refer to the following places in Poland:

- Krzyżowniki, part of the Jeżyce district of Poznań
- Krzyżowniki, Kępno County
- Krzyżowniki, Poznań County
