= Mały Buczek =

Mały Buczek may refer to:

- Mały Buczek, Kępno County, a village in the administrative district of Gmina Rychtal, Kępno County, Poland
- Mały Buczek, Złotów County, a village in the administrative district of Gmina Lipka, Złotów County, Poland
