= Wielki Buczek =

Wielki Buczek may refer to:

- Wielki Buczek, Kępno County, a village in the administrative district of Gmina Rychtal
- Wielki Buczek, Złotów County, Gmina Lipka
