= Dalanów =

- Settlement
- Location within Poland
- Coordinates: 51°06′40″N 17°53′49″E
- Country: Poland
- Voivodeship: Greater Poland
- County: Kępno
- Gmina: Rychtal

Dalanów [daˈlanuf] is a settlement in the administrative district of Gmina Rychtal, within Kępno County, Greater Poland Voivodeship, in west-central Poland.
