= Remiszówka =

- Settlement
- Location within Poland
- Coordinates: 51°12′N 17°54′E
- Country: Poland
- Voivodeship: Greater Poland
- County: Kępno
- Gmina: Rychtal

Remiszówka [rɛmiˈʂufka] is a settlement in the administrative district of Gmina Rychtal, within Kępno County, Greater Poland Voivodeship, in west-central Poland.
