= German–Polish Convention regarding Upper Silesia =

1922 treaty

Geneva Convention of 1922
German–Polish Convention regarding Upper Silesia
- Type: Bilateral Minority Treaty
- Signed: 15 May 1922
- Location: Geneva
- Ratified: 24 May 1922
- Effective: 20 June 1922
- Expiration: July 15, 1937
- Mediators: Upper Silesian Mixed Commission; Upper Silesian Arbitral Tribunal
- Parties: (Germany) German Reich; Republic of Poland
- Language: French

The German–Polish Convention on Upper Silesia (French: Convention germano-polonaise relative à la Haute Silésie; German: Deutsch–Polnisches Abkommen über Oberschlesien, Polish: Konwencja genewska o Górnym Śląsku), also known as the Geneva Convention of 15 May 1922, dealt with the constitutional and legal future of Upper Silesia, part of which became Polish territory after the 1921 Upper Silesia plebiscite.

== Background ==
Upper Silesia, with its mixed Polish and German population, was a province of Prussia in the German Reich prior to World War I. In the Treaty of Versailles, after the defeat of Germany and Austria-Hungary in World War I, the population of Upper Silesia was to hold a plebiscite to determine the division of the province between Poland and Germany, with the exception of a 333 km^{2} (129 sq mi) area around Hlučín (Hultschiner Ländchen), which was granted to Czechoslovakia in 1920 despite its German-speaking majority. The plebiscite, organised by the League of Nations, was held in 1921. In Teschen Silesia, there was an interim agreement between the Polish and Czechoslovak local self-government councils on the partition of past lands of the Duchy of Teschen along ethnic lines. However, it deal was not approved by the Czechoslovak government in Prague. Poland held elections in the entire disputed area, and in the Polish–Czechoslovak War, Czechoslovak troops invaded the lands of Teschen Silesia on 23 January 1919 and stopped on 30 January on the Weichsel River near Skotschau.

The planned plebiscite was not organised in the Teschen region but was held in most of the other parts of Upper Silesia. On 28 July 1920, the Spa Conference divided Teschen Silesia between Poland and Czechoslovakia along the present-day border.

== Upper Silesia Plebiscite ==
In 1918, various proposals emerged defining the division of Upper Silesia. At the Paris Peace Conference, a commission for Polish affairs was created to prepare proposals for the Polish borders. In its first two proposals (on 27 March 1919 and of 7 May 1919), most of the future province was ceded to Poland, together with the region of Oppeln. That was not accepted by the Big Four, however, and British Prime Minister David Lloyd George successfully suggested for a plebiscite to be organised.

Before it took place on 20 March 1921, two Silesian uprisings had been organised and instigated by Polish inhabitants of the area. Poland won 41% of the votes in the plebiscite, and a plan for the division of Upper Silesa was then made. that led to a new phase of the Silesian Uprisings, the so-called Third Silesian Uprising and the Battle of Annaberg. The result of the 1921 referendum was legally nonbinding and was ignored.

A new partition plan was prepared by the League of Nations and was adopted by the Conference of Ambassadors, the successor of the Supreme Council of the Principal Allied Powers, on 20 October 1921. That plan was due to enter into effect by 20 June 1922, but it still created a situation in which some rural territories that had voted for Poland were granted to Germany, and some urban territories that had voted for Germany were granted to Poland.

== Geneva Convention of 15 May 1922 ==
In 1921, a convention in Geneva to regulate the conditions in Upper Silesia took place under the chairmanship of Felix Calonder, a member of the Swiss Federal Council. The conference had the aims of alleviating the economic consequences of the partition of the highly-industrialised region and guaranteeing minority rights in both Polish and German Upper Silesia.

== Consequences ==
On 20 June 1922, the division according to the plan of the Conference of the Ambassadors became effective. Germany had to accept the loss of its coal-bearing land and was left with the economically-unimportant West Upper Silesia although Silesian coal was then highly relevant to the German economy. The major part of Silesia remaining in Germany was reorganised into the provinces of Upper Silesia and Lower Silesia.

The Polish Sejm decided that the easternmost Upper Silesian areas should become an autonomous area within Poland, organised as the Silesian Voivodeship and with the Silesian Parliament as a constituency and Silesian Voivodeship Council as the executive body. A central political figure was Wojciech Korfanty. The part of Silesia that was awarded to Poland was by far the best-developed and richest region of the newly formed state and produced most of Poland's industrial output.

== Mixed Commission and Arbitral Tribunal ==
The Upper Silesian Mixed Commission (or "Mixed Commission for Upper Silesia"), composed of an equal number of Polish and German delegates and headed by a neutral Swiss president, Felix Calonder, was set up as a quasi-judicial body to arbitrate disputes for a 15-year interim period until 1937. The Mixed Commission was headquartered in the Polish-held Katowice. The Upper Silesian Arbitral Tribunal (or "Arbitral Tribunal for Upper Silesia"), headquartered in the German-held Bytom and presided over by the Belgian international lawyer Georges Kaeckenbeeck, also played an adjudicating role.

The two states made little use of the commission, with only 18 complaints over the years. However, Calonder, who was active in protecting minority rights, handled more than 3,400 minority rights cases by individuals and groups. His opinions were non-binding on the contracting states and were not always followed, but they had an effect. In particular, the Bernheim petition led to the suspension of anti-Jewish legislation in German Upper Silesia until 1937. Individuals also made wide use of the Arbitral Tribunal, which solved more than 4,000 cases. Its wide-ranging powers included a procedure, known as "evocation", which prefigured the preliminary ruling procedure before the European Court of Justice, and the tribunal has even been described as "the most sophisticated international tribunal of [its] day".

== See also ==
- Silesian Voivodeship (1920–39)
- East Upper Silesia
- History of Silesia
