= Wesoła, Gmina Rychtal =

Wesoła
- Village
- Location within Poland
- Coordinates: 51°11′09″N 17°55′23″E
- Country: Poland
- Voivodeship: Greater Poland
- County: Kępno
- Gmina: Rychtal

Wesoła [vɛˈsɔwa] is a village in the administrative district of Gmina Rychtal, within Kępno County, Greater Poland Voivodeship, in west-central Poland.
