= Nowa Wieś, Gmina Rychtal =

Nowa Wieś
- Village
- Location within Poland
- Coordinates: 51°13′11″N 17°53′13″E
- Country: Poland
- Voivodeship: Greater Poland
- County: Kępno
- Gmina: Rychtal

Nowa Wieś [ˈnɔva ˈvjɛɕ] is a village in the administrative district of Gmina Rychtal, within Kępno County, Greater Poland Voivodeship, in west-central Poland.
