= Dworzyszcze =

- Settlement
- Location within Poland
- Coordinates: 51°7′10″N 17°51′21″E
- Country: Poland
- Voivodeship: Greater Poland
- County: Kępno
- Gmina: Rychtal

Dworzyszcze [dvɔˈʐɨʂt͡ʂɛ] is a settlement in the administrative district of Gmina Rychtal, within Kępno County, Greater Poland Voivodeship, in west-central Poland.
