= Bernheim petition =

The Bernheim petition was a 1933 petition by a Jewish resident of Gleiwitz - German Upper Silesia, Franz Bernheim, to the League of Nations in protest at Nazi anti-Jewish legislation.

The petition was made under the provisions of the 1922 German–Polish Accord on East Silesia which contained provisions for the protection of minority rights and set up a mixed German-Polish Commission for Upper Silesia, headed by Felix Calonder, for a period of 15 years ending in 1937. Bernheim had been dismissed from his job as a manager at Gleiwitz Deutsches Familien-Kaufhaus (DeFaKa) in April 1933 due to anti-Jewish legislation. The petition addressed not only Bernheim's dismissal but also racial discrimination in Upper Silesia as a whole, quoting provisions for firing "non-Aryan" public employees, notaries, lawyers, medical professionals, and teachers. The petition was accepted by the league, and led not only to financial compensation for Bernheim himself, but to the revocation of most racial provisions of Nazi laws in Upper Silesia. However, when article 147 of the accord on East Silesia expired on 15 July 1937, racial provisions in German laws were applied in Upper Silesia as well.
