= Gebhardt von Moltke =

German diplomat and ambassador (1938–2019)

Count Gebhardt von Moltke (28 June 1938 – 6 January 2019) was a German diplomat and ambassador.

== Early life ==
He descended from the German noble family Moltke. His father was the landowner and ambassador Count Hans-Adolf von Moltke (1884–1943) on the Wernersdorf estate where he was born. His mother was Countess Davida Yorck von Wartenburg (1900–1989), the daughter of Count Heinrich Yorck von Wartenburg.

== Education ==
In 1958, Moltke began his studies of law and national economics at the Ruprecht-Karls University of Heidelberg. He graduated in 1963 after studying in Grenoble, Berlin, as well as Freiburg im Breisgau and took his first state examination in the same year.

== Diplomatic career ==
Between 1963 and 1967 Moltke took an internship and finally took his second state examination. In 1968, he came into the higher echelons of the Foreign Service, where Gebhardt vom Moltke proceeded to work in the First Office of the Ministry of Foreign Affairs in Bonn.

From 1971 until 1977 Moltke worked in the Department of the German Ambassador in Moscow and Yaoundé. He then returned to the Foreign Office, where he was active in the Personnel Department. Between 1982 and 1986, he worked in the Political Department of the Embassy in Washington, after which he took over the leadership of the USA's Department at the Foreign Office.

In 1991 Gebhardt von Moltke became Assistant Secretary General for Political Affairs at NATO in Brussels. In 1997, he was named as the German ambassador in London, an office which he held until 1999 when he was appointed as Permanent Representative of Germany to the North Atlantic Council of NATO. In 2003 Moltke retired from the diplomatic service and became the new chairman of the German-British Society, which is a partner in the prestigious Königswinter Conference.

== Death ==
Gebhardt von Moltke was awarded an honorary LLD by Birmingham University in 2000.

Diplomatic posts
Preceded by Jürgen Oesterhelt	German Ambassador to the United Kingdom; 1997–1999	Succeeded by Hans-Friedrich von Ploetz
