= Wojnarowice =

- Village
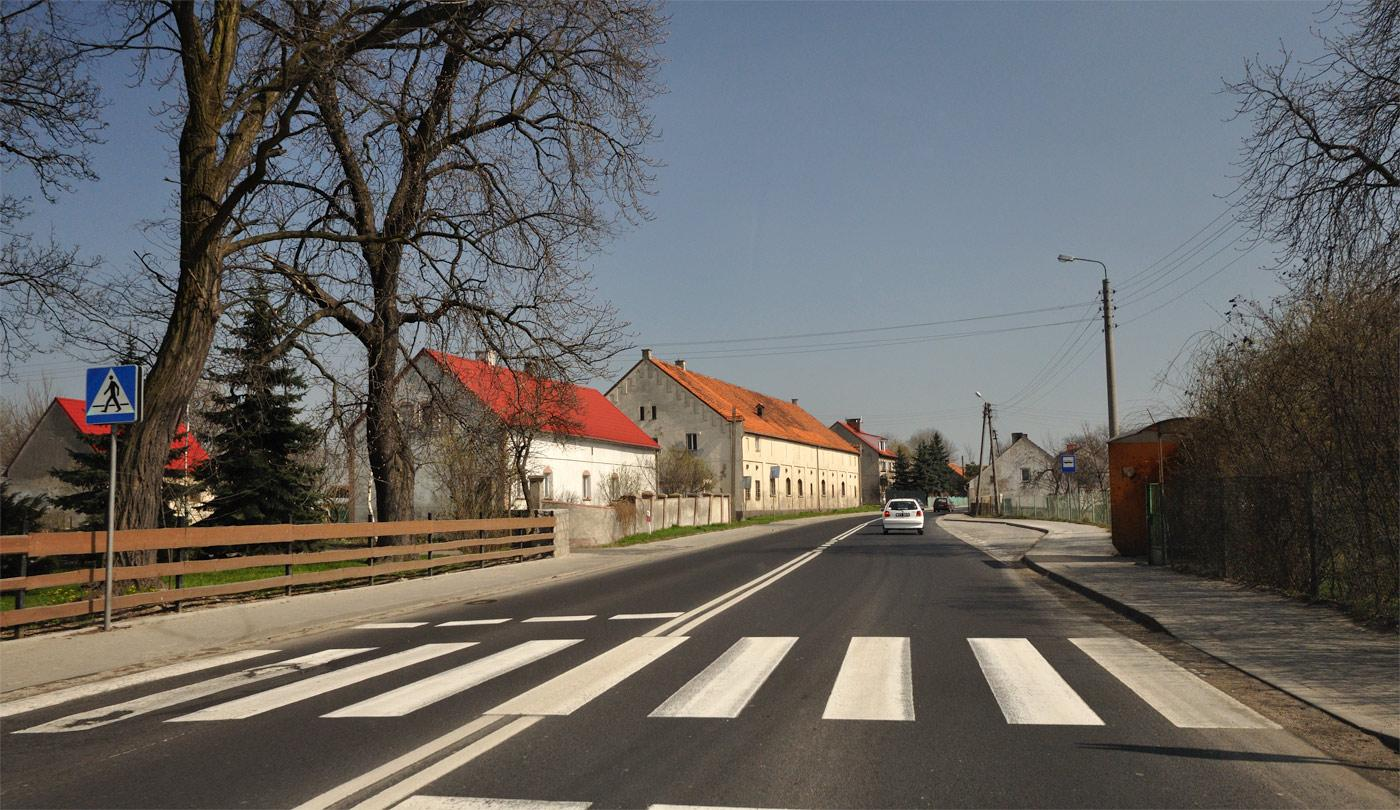

- Location within Poland
- Coordinates: 50°56′N 16°44′E
- Country: Poland
- Voivodeship: Lower Silesian
- County: Wrocław
- Gmina: Sobótka

Wojnarowice [vɔi̯narɔˈvit͡sɛ] is a village in the administrative district of Gmina Sobótka, within Wrocław County, Lower Silesian Voivodeship, in south-western Poland.

== Notable residents ==
- Gebhardt von Moltke (1938–2019), German diplomat
