= Gmina Rychtal =

Gmina Rychtal Rychtal Commune
- Gmina
- Flag Coat of arms

- Coordinates (Rychtal): 51°9′N 17°51′E
- Country: Poland
- Voivodeship: Greater Poland
- County: Kępno
- Seat: Rychtal

Area
  - Total: 96.75 km^{2} (37.36 sq mi)

Population (2006)
  - Total: 4,041
  - Density: 41.77/km^{2} (108.2/sq mi)

Gmina Rychtal is a rural gmina (administrative district) in Kępno County, Greater Poland Voivodeship, in west-central Poland. Its seat is the village of Rychtal, which lies approximately 18 kilometres (11 mi) south-west of Kępno and 153 km (95 mi) south-east of the regional capital Poznań.

The gmina covers an area of 96.75 square kilometres (37.4 sq mi), and as of 2006 its total population is 4,041.

== Villages ==
Gmina Rychtal contains the villages and settlements of Dalanów, Darnowiec, Drożki, Dworzyszcze, Krzyżowniki, Mały Buczek, Nowa Wieś, Proszów, Remiszówka, Skoroszów, Stogniewice, Szarlota, Wesoła, Wielki Buczek and Zgorzelec.

== Neighbouring gminas ==
Gmina Rychtal is bordered by the gminas of Baranów, Bralin, Domaszowice, Namysłów, Perzów, Trzcinica and Wołczyn.
