= Szarlota, Greater Poland Voivodeship =

Szarlota
- Village
- Location within Poland
- Coordinates: 51°07′41″N 17°58′40″E
- Country: Poland
- Voivodeship: Greater Poland
- County: Kępno
- Gmina: Rychtal
- Elevation: 190 m (620 ft)
- Population: 65

Szarlota [ʂarˈlɔta] is a village in the administrative district of Gmina Rychtal, within Kępno County, Greater Poland Voivodeship, in west-central Poland.
