= Georges Kaeckenbeeck =

Belgian lawyer, diplomat and civil servant

Georges Sylvain François Charles Kaeckenbeeck (May 30, 1892, in Saint-Gilles, Belgium – March 6, 1973, in Territet) was a Belgian international lawyer, diplomat and international civil servant.

== Life ==
Kaeckenbeeck studied law under international lawyer Maurice Bourquin at the Université libre de Bruxelles and at the University of Oxford.

In 1920, he joined the legal department of the General Secretariat of the League of Nations and in that role was instrumental in drafting the German-Polish Convention regarding Upper Silesia as chair of the treaty's drafting committee. He subsequently presided of the Upper Silesian Arbitral Tribunal (or "Arbitral Tribunal for Upper Silesia"), a body of the German-Polish Convention regarding Upper Silesia that arbitrated disputes for a 15-year interim period until 1937. Kaeckenbeeck has been called a "major player of international law during the interwar period."

From 1937 and 1939, he was a professor at the Graduate Institute of International Studies. Starting in 1940, Kaeckenbeeck was an advisor to the Belgian government in exile under Hubert Pierlot in London. In 1945, he became minister and representative of Belgium to the United Nations. From 1949 to 1953, he was secretary-general of the International Authority for the Ruhr in Düsseldorf. In October 1955, Kaeckenbeeck became chairman of the steering committee of the Troops Treaty Conference in Bonn, which determined the legal framework for the stationing of NATO troops in Germany.

== Publications ==
Representative publications include:

- International Rivers: A Monograph Based on Diplomatic Documents (London, Foreign Office) (1920) 255p
- '"The Protection of Vested Rights in International Law," British Yearbook of International Law, (1936)
- '"Upper Silesia Under the League of Nations," The ANNALS of the American Academy of Political and Social Science, (1946)
