= Zgorzelec, Greater Poland Voivodeship =

Zgorzelec
- Village
- Location within Poland
- Coordinates: 51°9′N 17°53′E
- Country: Poland
- Voivodeship: Greater Poland
- County: Kępno
- Gmina: Rychtal

Zgorzelec [zɡɔˈʐɛlɛt͡s] is a village in the administrative district of Gmina Rychtal, within Kępno County, Greater Poland Voivodeship, in west-central Poland.
