= Drożki =

- Village
- Location within Poland
- Coordinates: 51°12′N 17°52′E
- Country: Poland
- Voivodeship: Greater Poland
- County: Kępno
- Gmina: Rychtal

Drożki [ˈdrɔʂki] is a village in the administrative district of Gmina Rychtal, within Kępno County, Greater Poland Voivodeship, in west-central Poland.
