= Mały Buczek, Kępno County =

Mały Buczek
- Village
- Location within Poland
- Coordinates: 51°7′31″N 17°57′30″E
- Country: Poland
- Voivodeship: Greater Poland
- County: Kępno
- Gmina: Rychtal
- Population: 110

Mały Buczek ([ˈmawɨ ˈbut͡ʂɛk]; German: Klein Butschkau) is a village in the administrative district of Gmina Rychtal, within Kępno County, Greater Poland Voivodeship, in west-central Poland.
