= Landkreis Kattowitz =

Landkreis Kattowitz (until 1899 Kreis Kattowitz) was a Prussian district in Upper Silesia from 1873 to 1922. Its district seat was the city of Katowice, which formed its own urban district from 1899. The former district area is now part of the Polish Silesian Voivodeship. The district of Kattowitz was also a German administrative unit in occupied Poland during World War II (1939-1945).
