= Proszów, Greater Poland Voivodeship =

Proszów
- Village
- Location within Poland
- Coordinates: 51°7′N 17°53′E
- Country: Poland
- Voivodeship: Greater Poland
- County: Kępno
- Gmina: Rychtal

Proszów [ˈprɔʂuf] is a village in the administrative district of Gmina Rychtal, within Kępno County, Greater Poland Voivodeship, in west-central Poland.
