= Henri Le Rond =

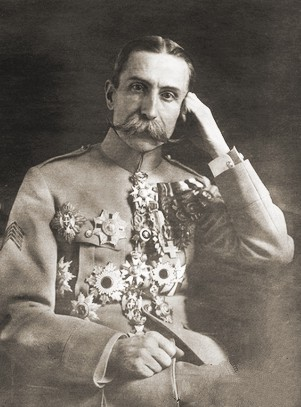
General Henri Le Rond

Henri Le Rond (9 October 1864 – 29 May 1949) was a French General, officer of the Deuxième Bureau and Head of the Inter-Allied Administrative and Plebiscite Commission in Upper Silesia ("C.I.H.S"; French: Commission interalliée de gouvernement et de plébiscite de Haute-Silésie). The commission suggested a plan to divide the region of Upper Silesia in the aftermath of World War I, which led to the cession of East Upper Silesia.

Le Rond was born in Rouen as Henri Louis Edouard Le Rond. In 1921, he became Grand Officer of the French Legion of Honour, received 1926 the Grand Cross. Later he was awarded with the Czechoslovak Order of the White Lion, the Polish Order of the White Eagle and Order Virtuti Militari, and the Order of Saint-Charles of Monaco. Le Rond died 1949 in Paris.

== Literature ==
- Jadwiga Liponska-Sajdak: General Henri Le Rond: W 75 rocznice III Powstania Slaskiego (polish)
- Dziennik Personalny, R.3, nr 27, s. 616
