= Krzyżowniki, Kępno County =

Krzyżowniki
- Village
- Location within Poland
- Coordinates: 51°7′N 17°53′E
- Country: Poland
- Voivodeship: Greater Poland
- County: Kępno
- Gmina: Rychtal

Krzyżowniki [kʂɨʐɔvˈniki] is a village in the administrative district of Gmina Rychtal, within Kępno County, Greater Poland Voivodeship, in west-central Poland.
