= Wielki Buczek, Kępno County =

Wielki Buczek
- Village
- Location within Poland
- Coordinates: 51°7′31″N 17°57′30″E
- Country: Poland
- Voivodeship: Greater Poland
- County: Kępno
- Gmina: Rychtal
- Elevation: 200 m (660 ft)
- Population: 500

Wielki Buczek (Polish pronunciation: [ˈvjɛlkʲi ˈbutʂɛk]) is a village in the administrative district of Gmina Rychtal, within Kępno County, Greater Poland Voivodeship, in west-central Poland.
