= Rychtal =

- Town
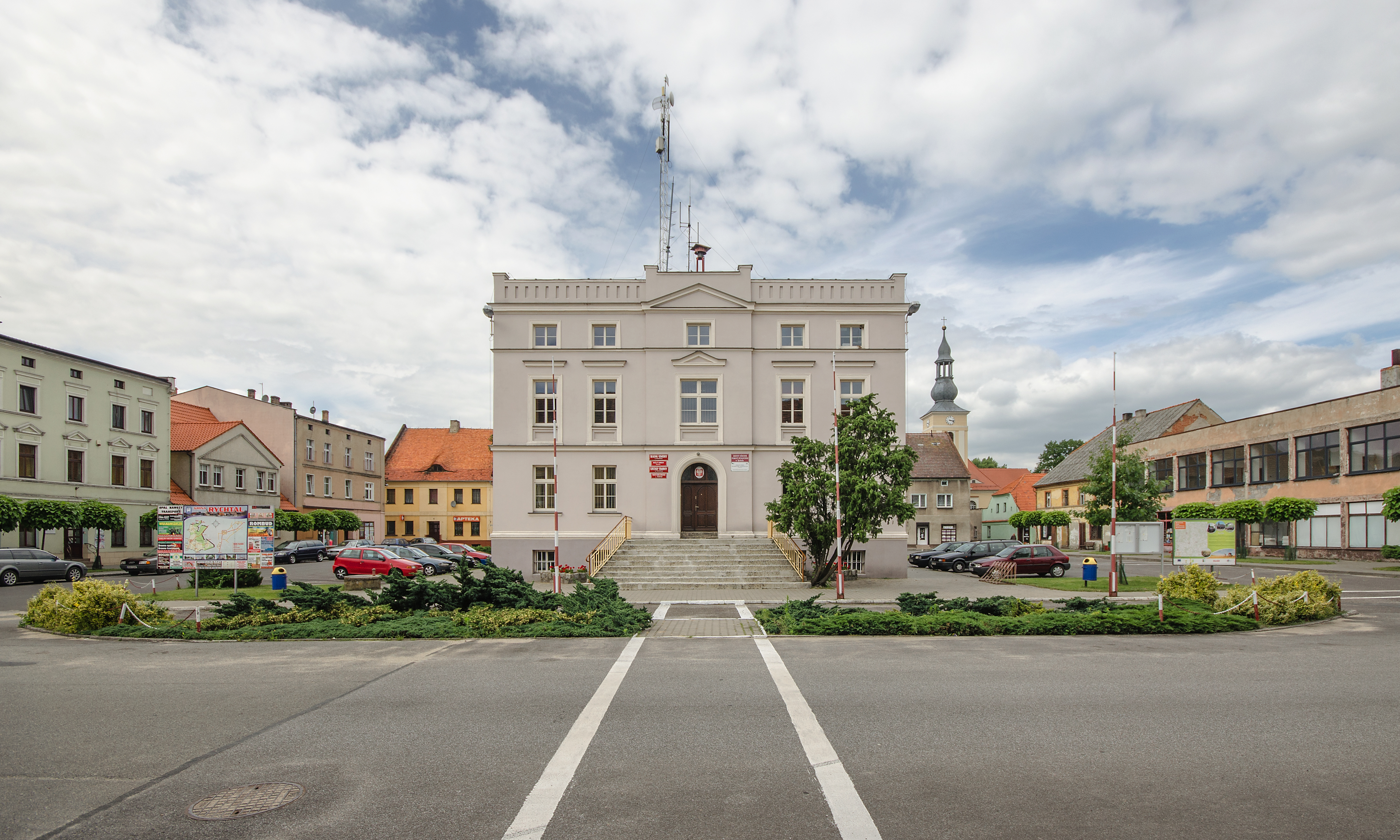
- Town hall

- Coat of arms

- Location within Poland
- Coordinates: 51°9′N 17°51′E
- Country: Poland
- Voivodeship: Greater Poland
- County: Kępno
- Gmina: Rychtal

Population
  - Total: 1,300
- Vehicle registration: PKE

Rychtal ([ˈrɨxtal]) is a town in Kępno County, Greater Poland Voivodeship, in south-central Poland. It is the seat of the gmina (administrative district) called Gmina Rychtal.

== History ==
The area became part of the emerging Polish state in the 10th century, and after the fragmentation of Poland into smaller duchies, it formed part of the Duchy of Silesia. The Polish settlement at the site called Będłowice or Bandlowice is documented in 1222, when the estates were held by the Teutonic Order. From 1233 onwards, the Silesian duke Henry the Bearded opened the remote area to German and Walloon colonists in the course of the mediaeval Ostsiedlung migration. Their settlement Reichthal ("Rich Valley") was first mentioned as a town in 1294, then a possession of the Bishops of Wrocław. It replaced the older Polish locality, nevertheless, due to the proximity of the episcopal lands to Greater Poland, the Rychtal area remained bilingual with both Polish and German speaking populations and predominantly Catholic.

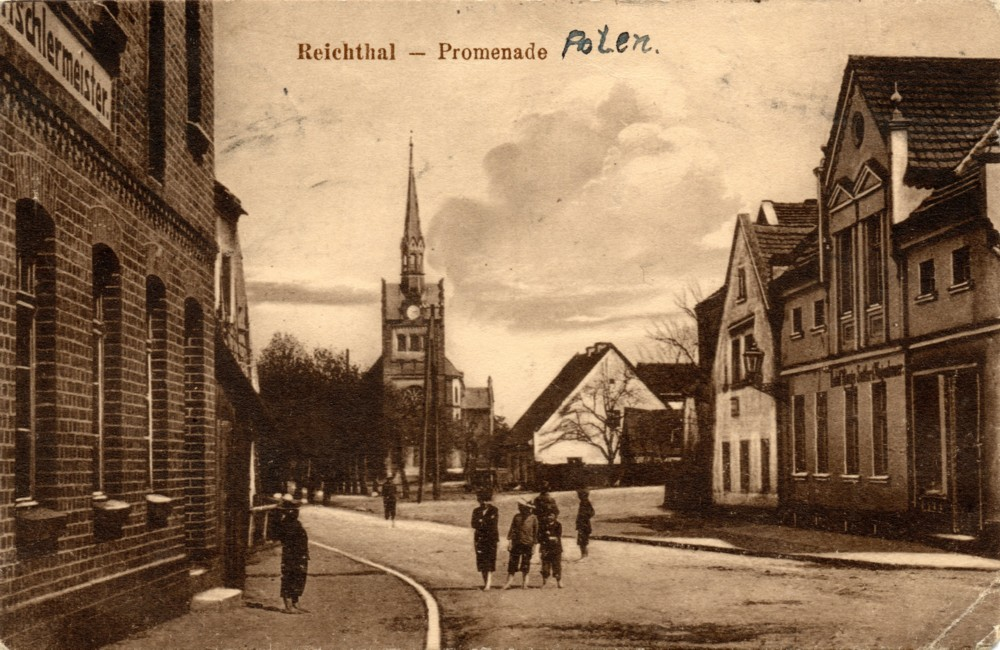
Postcard, about 1920

In the 18th century, the town was annexed by Prussia. After the secularization of the Bishopric's estates under Prussian rule in 1810, Rychtal belonged to the Namslau (Namysłów) district of the Silesia Province. In 1842, the town had a population of 1,310, predominantly Polish by ethnicity and Catholic by confession. During the Polish January Uprising in 1863 weapons were smuggled through the town to the Russian Partition of Poland. From 1871 it formed part of the German Empire. After the German defeat in World War I, the area (Reichthaler Ländchen) was allocated to the Greater Polish Poznań Voivodeship of the Second Polish Republic by the 1919 Treaty of Versailles. Rychtal lost town privileges in 1934.

Historical population
Year	Pop.	±%
1842	1,310	—
1921	928	−29.2%
1931	1,126	+21.3%

In the course of the German invasion of Poland, which started World War II in September 1939, it was occupied by Nazi Germany as part of the Reichsgau Wartheland, attended with persecutions of the Polish inhabitants. In 1939, the Germans carried out the first expulsions of Poles, and several died during their deportation in freight trains to Mińsk Mazowiecki in the more-eastern part of German-occupied Poland. The local Polish police chief was murdered by the Russians in the Katyn massacre in 1940. The area was overrun by the Red Army in the course of the Vistula–Oder Offensive in January 1945 and restored to the Republic of Poland.

== Cuisine ==
The officially protected traditional food of Rychtal, as designated by the Ministry of Agriculture and Rural Development of Poland, is kaszanka rychtalska, a local type of kaszanka.
