= Jan Nowak =

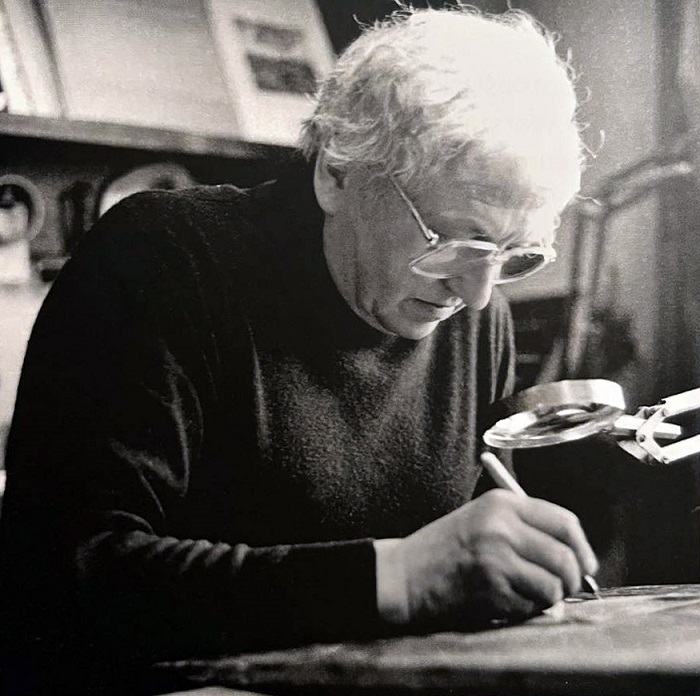

Background information
- Born: Jan Kazimierz Nowak; 1 July 1930; Siemianowice Śląskie, Poland
- Died: 5 June 2010 (aged 79) Tychy, Poland
- Occupations: Graphic designer, painter

Jan Nowak (1 July 1930 – 5 June 2010) was a Polish graphic designer and painter.

== Biography ==
Nowak was born on 1 July 1930 in Siemianowice Śląskie. He studied at Jan Matejko Academy of Fine Arts in Kraków and at the Faculty of Graphic Arts of the Katowice branch of the Academy of Fine Arts in Kraków in the years 1951–1957. He obtained his diploma in the Graphic Arts studio of Professor Aleksander Rak. In 1960, he settled permanently in Tychy. He died in Tychy on 5 June 2010, at the age of 79.

He practiced graphic arts: lithography, etching, aquatint, mezzotint, drypoint, painting, drawing, poster and book graphics. Many of his landscapes included panoramas of old Upper Silesia and the nearby Siemianowice Śląskie, as well as Katowice, Chorzów, Tychy and Gliwice.
