= Barbara Blida =

Polish politician (1949–2007)

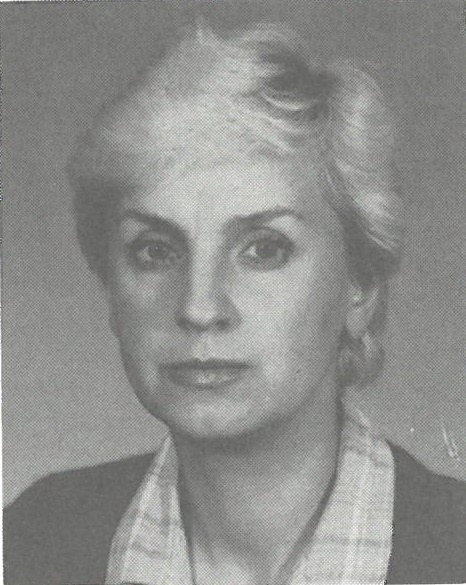

Member of Sejm
- In office 4 July 1989 – 18 October 2005

Minister for Construction and Spatial Management of the Republic of Poland
- In office 26 October 1993 – 31 December 1996
- Preceded by: Andrzej Bratkowski
- Succeeded by: Jerzy Kropiwnicki

Personal details
- Born: Barbara Marie Szwajnoch; 3 December 1949 Siemianowice Śląskie
- Died: 25 April 2007 (aged 57) Siemianowice Śląskie
- Party: Democratic Left Alliance

Barbara Maria Blida, née Szwajnoch (3 December 1949 – 25 April 2007) was a Polish political figure who served in the nation's Parliament (Sejm) for 16 years (1989–2005), including a stint as a member of the cabinet, and whose suicide in the midst of an investigation for corruption became front-page news in Poland as well as in a number of news outlets around the world.

== Early years ==
A native of the city of Siemianowice Śląskie in Metropolis GZM, Barbara Maria Szwajnoch joined, in 1969, at the age of 20, Polish United Workers' Party, the name used by the Communist Party ruling Poland since the period following World War II. Family tradition to the contrary, she remained a member until the Party's termination and restructuring twenty years later. From 1968 to 1977 she was employed as a workplace safety specialist at the Chorzów nitrogen works and, by 1976, had graduated from the Silesian University of Technology with a major in sanitary engineering.

== Political career ==
Using her married name, Barbara Blida, she was elected to the Sejm as a member of the Workers' Party in June 1989 and served for six consecutive terms, until 2005. Seven months after taking her seat, following the January 1990 dissolution of the Party in the context of the 1990–91 fall of Communism, she continued as a member of the Party's political successors, Social Democracy of the Republic of Poland (1990–99) and Democratic Left Alliance (1999–2004) and, having resigned from the Alliance in 2004, served out her last year as an independent member. During her service in the Sejm, she was appointed, on 26 October 1993, to the cabinet of Prime Minister Waldemar Pawlak as Minister for Construction and Spatial Management and served in that capacity in subsequent governments of Józef Oleksy and Włodzimierz Cimoszewicz until 31 December 1996, when the ministry was transformed into the Central Office for Housing and Municipal Development, with Blida remaining in charge until Cimoszewicz's government ended its term on 17 October 1997. The ministry ended with her and, three years later was restored as Ministry of Regional Development and Construction, headed by Jerzy Kropiwnicki. Following tenure as a member of the cabinet, she continued as a member of the Sejm for eight years, but also ventured into business, becoming, in 2001, the president of J.W. Construction sp. z o.o., one of Poland's largest real-estate developers.

== Accusation of corruption followed by suicide ==
According to media accounts and later official reports, Barbara Blida was named as one of the officials who received illegal payments from businesswoman Barbara Kmiecik, one of the richest women in the country during the 1990s, whom the press had dubbed "Alexis of Polish mining" or "Alexis of Silesia", after the money/power-hungry "Alexis Carrington" character on the then-popular prime-time soap Dynasty. Following her 2005 arrest for corrupting public officials involved with the so-called "coal mafia", Kmiecik allegedly named a number of officials, including Barbara Blida, although the authorities did not release any names, nor details of Kmiecik's revelations.

On the early morning of Wednesday, 25 April 2007, representatives of ABW (Agencja Bezpieczeństwa Wewnętrznego [Agency of Internal Security]) entered Blida's house in Siemianowice Śląskie with a prosecutor's warrant to arrest her and search the house for evidence. According to ABW reports, during the search, she asked for permission to use the bathroom, where she shot herself through the heart using her Astra 680 revolver, with subsequent resuscitation efforts by ABW agents proving to be fruitless.

== Aftermath ==
Barbara Blida, who was 57 years old at the time of her suicide, became the top news item in the Polish media that day, and sparked many comments and controversies, which were also voiced during a special Sejm session. ABW was accused of unprofessional handling of the matter, especially for not ascertaining that Blida relinquished the weapon, since it was public knowledge that she was granted a permit for and owned one after threats on her life in previous years. Some sources also purported that her death could not come as a result of planned suicide, but rather from a scuffle with ABW agents, an accusation promptly dismissed by the officials. Opposition leaders subsequently called for the resignation of Minister Zbigniew Wassermann, the Secret Services Coordinator, but during a hearing in the Sejm he announced he had no intentions of resigning and stated that Prime Minister Jarosław Kaczyński should, instead, suspend the chief of ABW.
