= Bernhard Gröschel =

German linguist (1939–2009)

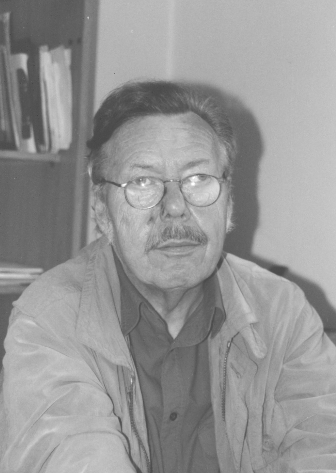
- Bernhard Gröschel (1997)
- Born: June 19, 1939; Nový Bor, North Bohemia, Czechoslovakia
- Died: October 4, 2009 (aged 70); Münster, North Rhine-Westphalia, Germany
- Education: University of Bonn (Ph.D.)
- Scientific career
- Fields: General Linguistics; Slavic studies Phonetics; Communication studies
- Workplaces: University of Bonn; University of Münster

Bernhard Gröschel (19 June 1939 – 4 October 2009) was a German linguist and slavist.

== Biography ==
Bernhard Gröschel studied Slavic Studies, General Linguistics, Phonetics and Communication Studies at the University of Bonn. In 1967 he received his Ph.D. in Bonn and continued to work there as a researcher and lecturer. From 1977 to 2004 he worked at the Department of General Linguistics at the University of Münster.

Gröschel is best known for his book Das Serbokroatische zwischen Linguistik und Politik (Serbo-Croatian between Linguistics and Politics).

== Selected publications ==
- Die Sprache Ivan Vyšenśkyjs: Untersuchungen und Materialien zur historischen Grammatik des Ukrainischen. Slavistische Forschungen, Bd. 13 (in German). Köln and Wien: Böhlau Verlag. 1972, p. 384. ISBN 3-412-04372-9. doi:10.2307/305663. S2CID 169227116.
- Materialistische Sprachwissenschaft. Pragmalinguistik, Bd. 15 (in German). Weinheim and Basel: Verlagsgruppe Beltz. 1978, p. 239. ISBN 3-407-58026-6.
- Sprachnorm, Sprachplanung und Sprachpflege. Studium Sprachwissenschaft, Bd. 6 (in German). Münster: Institut für Allgemeine Sprachwissenschaft der Westfälischen Wilhelms-Universität. 1982, p. 232.
- (with Elena Parwanowa) Russisch-deutsches Wörterbuch der linguistischen Terminologie: Band 1 und 2. Studium Sprachwissenschaft, Beiheft 3 (in German). Münster: Institut für Allgemeine Sprachwissenschaft der Westfälischen Wilhelms-Universität, 1985, p. 935.
- Die Presse Oberschlesiens von den Anfängen bis zum Jahre 1945: Dokumentation und Strukturbeschreibung. Schriften der Stiftung Haus Oberschlesien: Landeskundliche Reihe, Bd. 4 (in German). Berlin: Gebr. Mann. 1993, p. 447. ISBN 3-7861-1669-5.
- Studien und Materialien zur oberschlesischen Tendenzpublizistik des 19. und 20. Jahrhunderts. Schriften der Stiftung Haus Oberschlesien: Landeskundliche Reihe, Bd. 5 (in German). Berlin: Gebr. Mann, 1993, p. 219. ISBN 3-7861-1698-9.
- Themen und Tendenzen in Schlagzeilen der Kattowitzer Zeitung und des Oberschlesischen Kuriers 1925 - 1939: Analyse der Berichterstattung zur Lage der deutschen Minderheit in Ostoberschlesien. Schriften der Stiftung Haus Oberschlesien: Landeskundliche Reihe, Bd. 6 (in German). Berlin: Gebr. Mann, 1993, p. 188. ISBN 3-7861-1719-5.
- (with Clemens-Peter Herbermann and Ulrich Hermann Waßner) Sprache & Sprachen: Teil 1: Fachsystematik der allgemeinen Sprachwissenschaft und Sprachensystematik; mit ausführlichen Terminologie- und Namenregistern (in German). Wiesbaden: Harrassowitz Verlag, 1997, p. 630. ISBN 3-447-03948-5.
- (with Clemens-Peter Herbermann and Ulrich Hermann Waßner) Sprache & Sprachen: Teil 2: Thesaurus zur allgemeinen Sprachwissenschaft und Sprachenthesaurus (in German). Wiesbaden: Harrassowitz Verlag, 2002, p. 389. ISBN 3-447-04567-1.
- Das Serbokroatische zwischen Linguistik und Politik: mit einer Bibliographie zum postjugoslavischen Sprachenstreit. Lincom Studies in Slavic Linguistics, Bd. 34 (in German). Munich: Lincom Europa. 2009. p. 451. ISBN 978-3-929075-79-3. LCCN 2009473660. OCLC 428012015. OL 15295665W. COBISS 43144034. Contents.

== See also ==
- Ausbausprache
- Dialect continuum
- Differences between Serbo-Croatian standard varieties
- Folk linguistics
- Language secessionism in Serbo-Croatian
- Mutual intelligibility
- Serbo-Croatian language
- Standard language
- Shtokavian dialect
