= Bytków TV Tower =

Communications tower in Poland

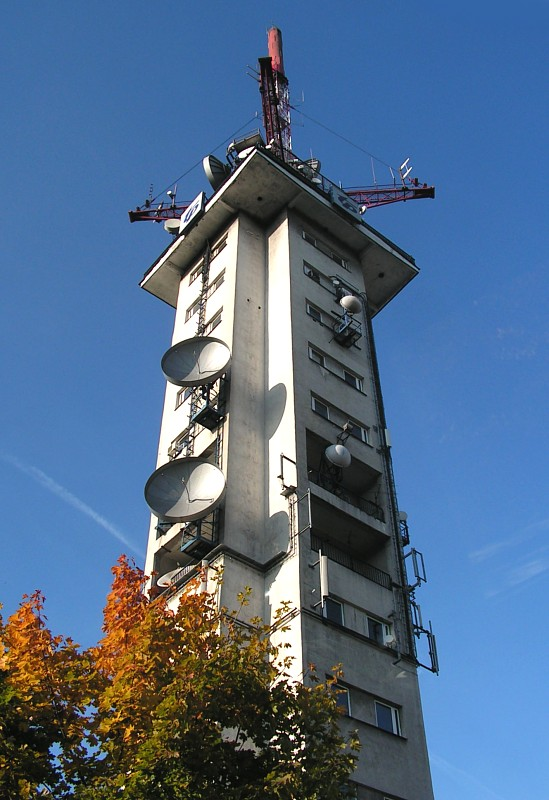
Bytkow TV Tower

Bytków TV Tower is a 110-metre-tall (360 ft) RadioTV tower in Siemianowice Śląskie, Poland, on the border with Bytków, an urban part of Katowice. Bytków TV Tower, situated at 50°17′45″N 19°00′31″E, has a unique design: it consists of a reinforced concrete tower as its base, with the appearance of a thin high-rise building with a square cross section. On the top of this concrete tower, there is a horizontal steel cross turned at an angle of 45 degree to the sides of the concrete tower. At the ends of the crossarms, which are equipped with gangways, the antenna mast on its top is guyed.

Bytków TV Tower is operated by company Emitel SA, is not accessible for visitors and is used for directional radio services, FM- and TV-transmissions. It started broadcasting in 1957.

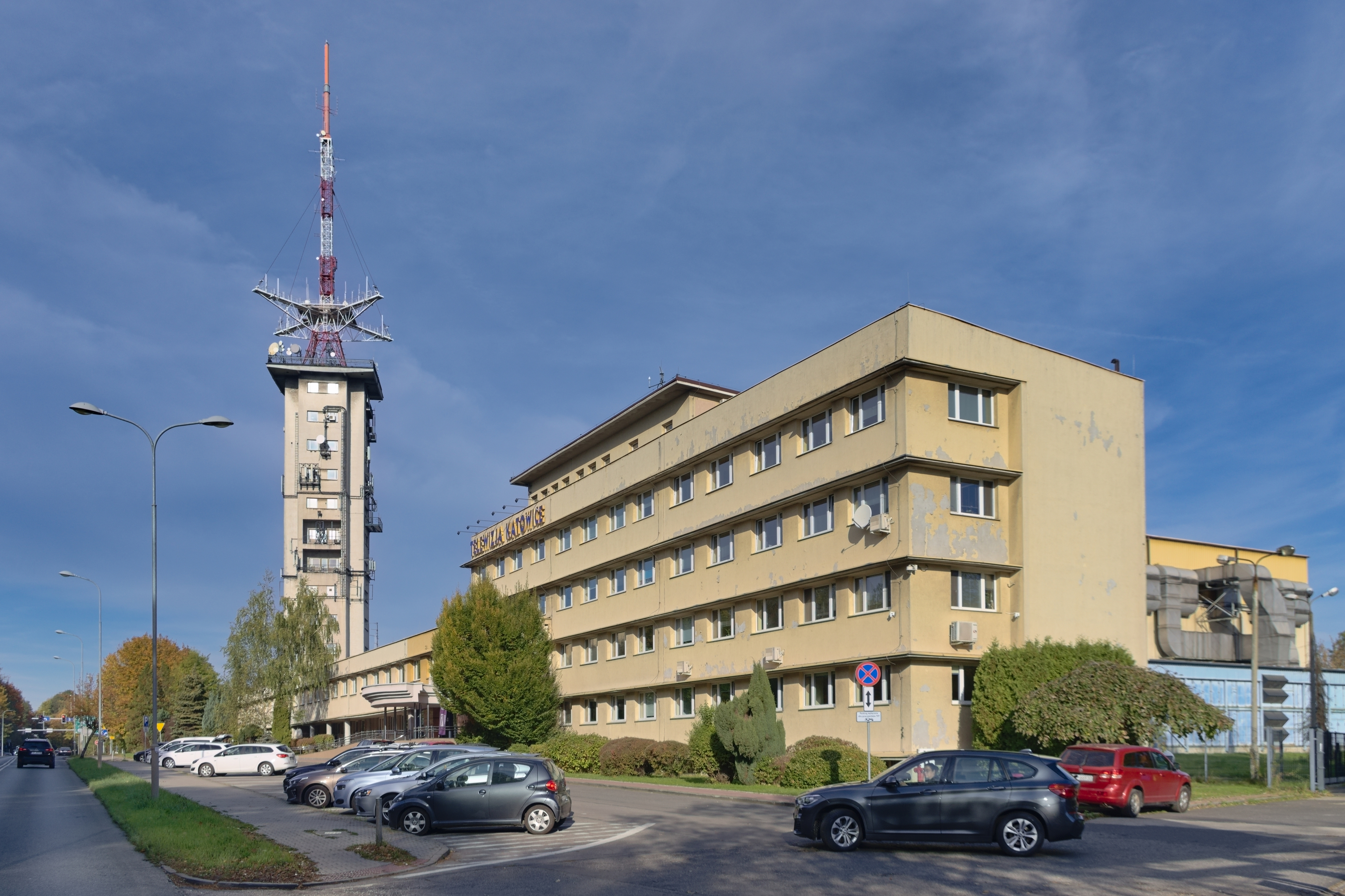
Bytków TV Tower in Bytków, Poland

== Transmitted programmes ==
Radio
Program	Frequency	Transmitter power
PR EURO Polskie Radio S.A.	95,90 MHz	0,10 kW
Polskie Radio Katowice	101,20 MHz	1 kW

== Digital Television MPEG-4 ==
Multiplex	Programmes in Multiplex	Frequency MHz	Channel	ERP kW	Polarisation	Antenna Diagram around (ND) / directional (D)	Modulation	FEC
MUX 3	TVP1 HD; TVP2 HD; TVP Katowice; TVP Kultura; TVP Historia; TVP Polonia; TVP Rozrywka; TVP Info	634	41	10	Horizontal	ND	64-QAM	5/6

== See also ==
- List of towers
