= Siemianowice Śląskie =

City in Silesia

Siemianowice Śląskie Śymjanowice
- City county
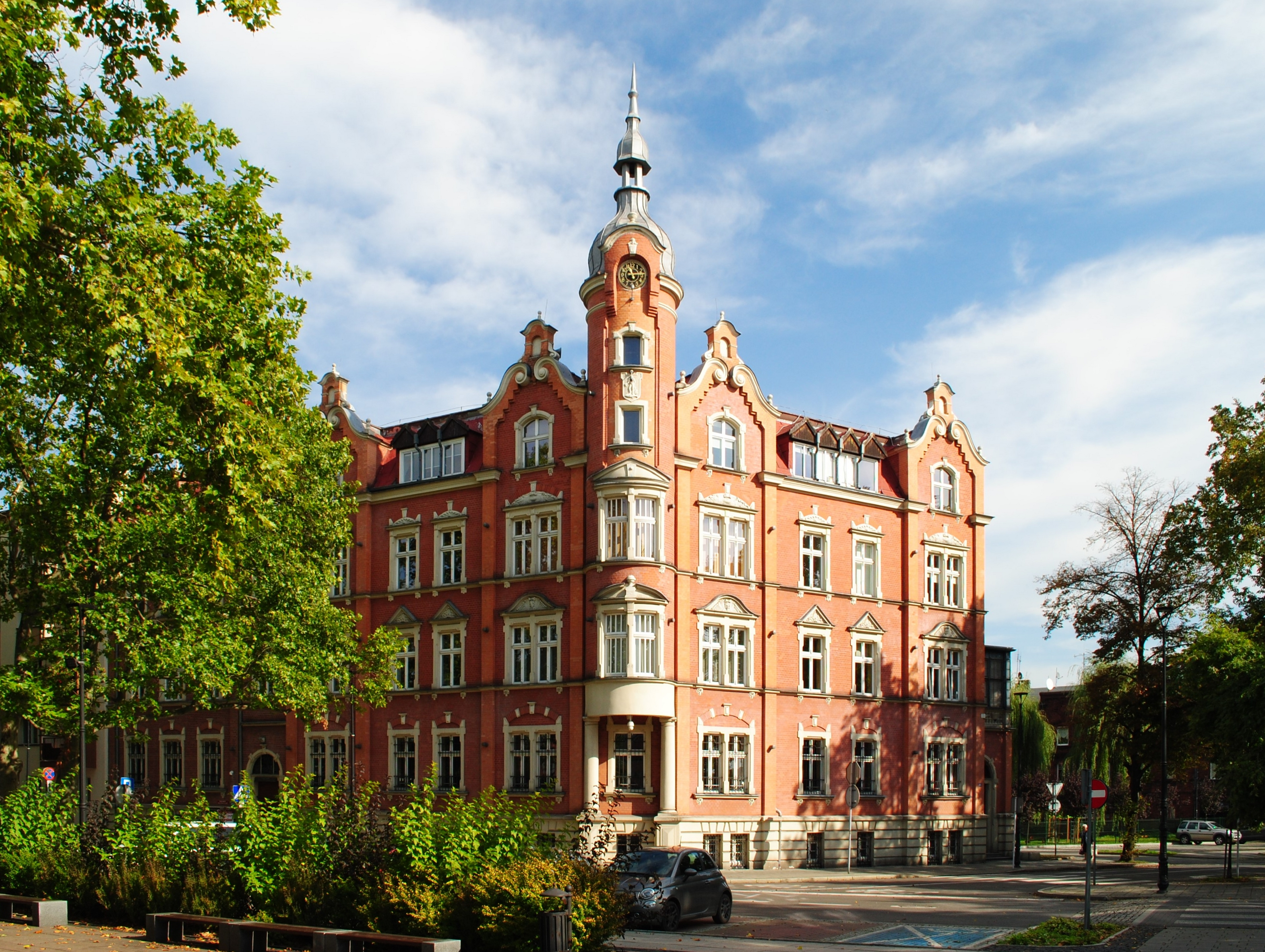
- City Hall

- Flag Coat of arms

- Location within Poland
- Coordinates: 50°16′33″N 18°59′9″E
- Country: Poland
- Voivodeship: Silesian
- County: city county
- Established: 13th century
- City rights: 1932

Government
  - City mayor: Rafał Piech (PJJ)

Area
  - Total: 25.5 km^{2} (9.8 sq mi)
- Highest elevation: 295 m (968 ft)
- Lowest elevation: 260 m (850 ft)

Population (31 December 2021)
  - Total: 65,684 ▼
  - Density: 2,580/km^{2} (6,670/sq mi)
- Time zone: UTC+1 (CET)
  - Summer (DST): UTC+2 (CEST)
- Postal code: 41-100 to 41-106
- Area code: +48 32
- Car plates: SI
- Primary airport: Katowice Airport
- Website: http://www.siemianowice.pl

Siemianowice Śląskie (Polish pronunciation: [ɕɛmjanɔˈvit͡sɛ ˈɕlɔ̃skʲɛ]; German: Siemianowitz-Laurahütte; Silesian: Śymjanowice) also known as Siemianowice is a city in Upper Silesia in southern Poland, near Katowice, in the core of the Metropolis GZM - a metropolis with a population of 2 million people and is located in the Silesian Highlands, on the Brynica river (tributary of the Vistula).

It is situated in the Silesian Voivodeship since its formation in 1999, previously in Katowice Voivodeship, and before then in the Autonomous Silesian Voivodeship. Siemianowice is one of the cities of the 2.7 million conurbation, the Katowice urban area, at the heart of the greater Katowice-Ostrava metropolitan area populated by about 5,294,000 people. The population of the city is 65,684 (2021). Siemianowice Śląskie borders six cities: Piekary Śląskie, Chorzów, Czeladź, Będzin, Wojkowice, and the voivodeship capital Katowice.

== Etymology ==
There are three hypothetical explanations for the origins of the name Siemianowice: either it comes from seven huts which were called Siedminowice/Siedmionowice in Old Polish; from the old legend about Siemion (Siemian), Michał and Maciej, or Siemion, Michał and Jakub; or it comes from ziemia nawa which means earth taken away from water.

== Administrative division ==
- Centrum – 11.98 km^{2} (4.63 sq mi)
- Michałkowice – 5.46 km^{2} (2.11 sq mi)
- Bańgów – 2.96 km^{2} (1.14 sq mi)
- Przełajka – 2.7 km^{2} (1.0 sq mi)
- Bytków – 2.3 km^{2} (0.89 sq mi)

== History ==
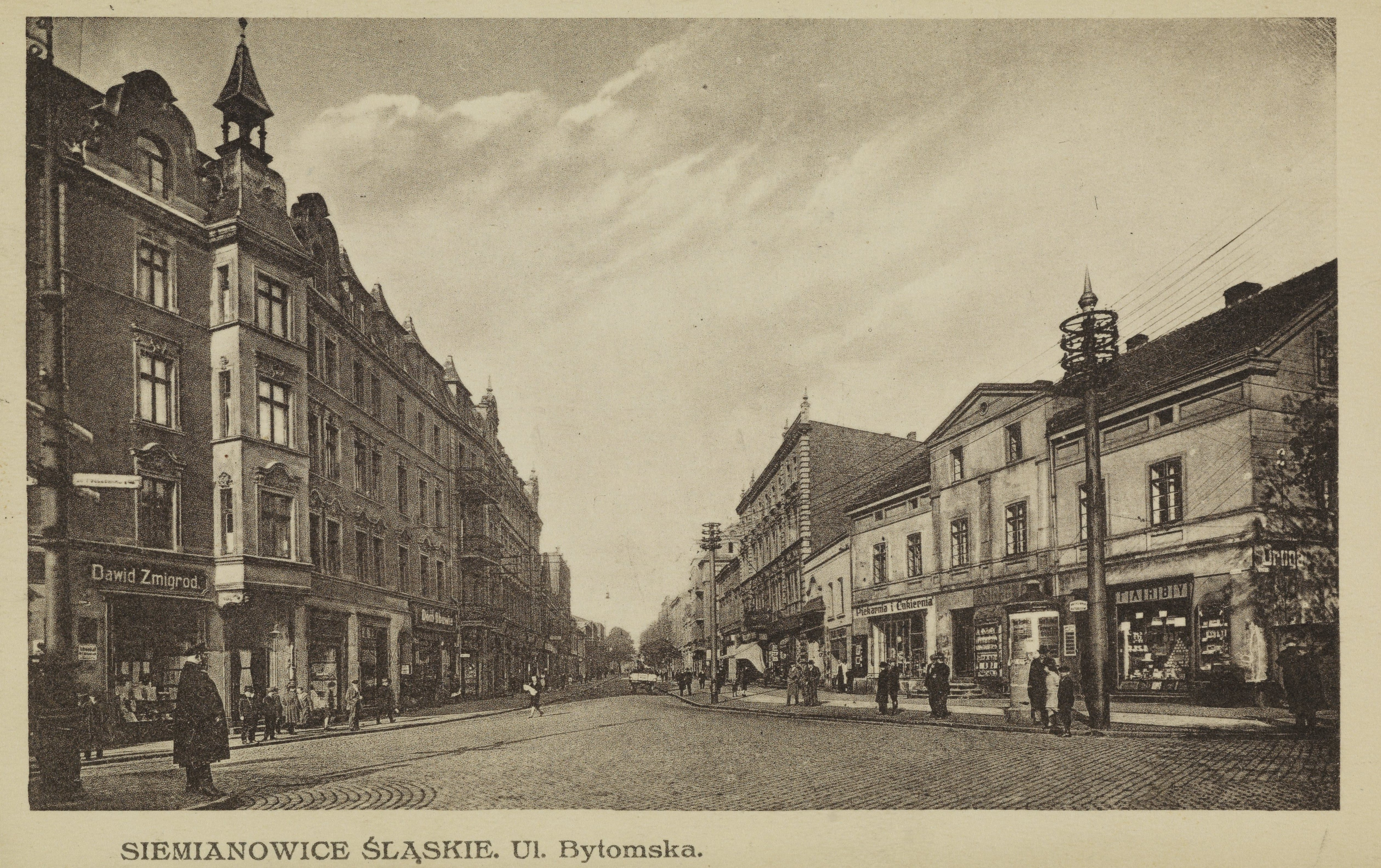
Siemianowice Śląskie during the interwar period

Siemianowice dates back to medieval Piast-ruled Poland. It was probably first mentioned in documents in 1253.

In 1924, Siemianowice and Huta Laury communes were merged. The new city was named Siemianowice Śląskie and gained town privileges in 1932.

=== World War II ===
On 1 September 1939, the first day of the German invasion of Poland and World War II, there was a skirmish between German saboteurs and the Polish self-defense in the present-day district of Michałkowice. German saboteurs then entered the local mine, taking several dozen Polish miners as hostages. After a battle, Polish troops and volunteers, including members of the "Sokół" Polish Gymnastic Society and boy scouts, recaptured the mine. There were deaths on both sides, and the Poles also captured dozens of German saboteurs. The Germans eventually invaded and captured the city in the following days, and already on 8 September 1939 the German Freikorps murdered six Poles in the city. In September 1939, the German Einsatzgruppe I operated in the city and committed various crimes against the Polish population.

At least seven Polish policemen from Siemianowice Śląskie were murdered by the Russians in the Katyn massacre in April 1940.

During the German occupation, two forced labour camps were established and operated in the city: one for Poles (Polenlager) and one for Jews. In April 1944, the Germans also established a subcamp of the Auschwitz concentration camp, in which over 900 people were held and subjected to forced labour. In January 1945, the prisoners of the subcamp were taken to the Mauthausen concentration camp, and shortly afterwards the Germans left the city and the occupation ended.

=== Recent period ===
In 1951, Michałkowice, Bytków, Bańgów and Przełajka were included within the city limits of Siemianowice as new districts.

== Industry ==
- Adient (United States, Car Parts Manufacturing)
- Aperam (Luxembourg, Stainless Steel Manufacturing)
- Fastening Elements Factory (Poland, Fastening Hardware Manufacturing)
- Rosomak S.A. (Poland, Defence Systems)
- Fabud (Poland, Building Company)
- Huhtamäki (Finland, Specialty Packaging Products)

== Notable architectural structures ==
Sights of Siemianowice Śląskie (examples)

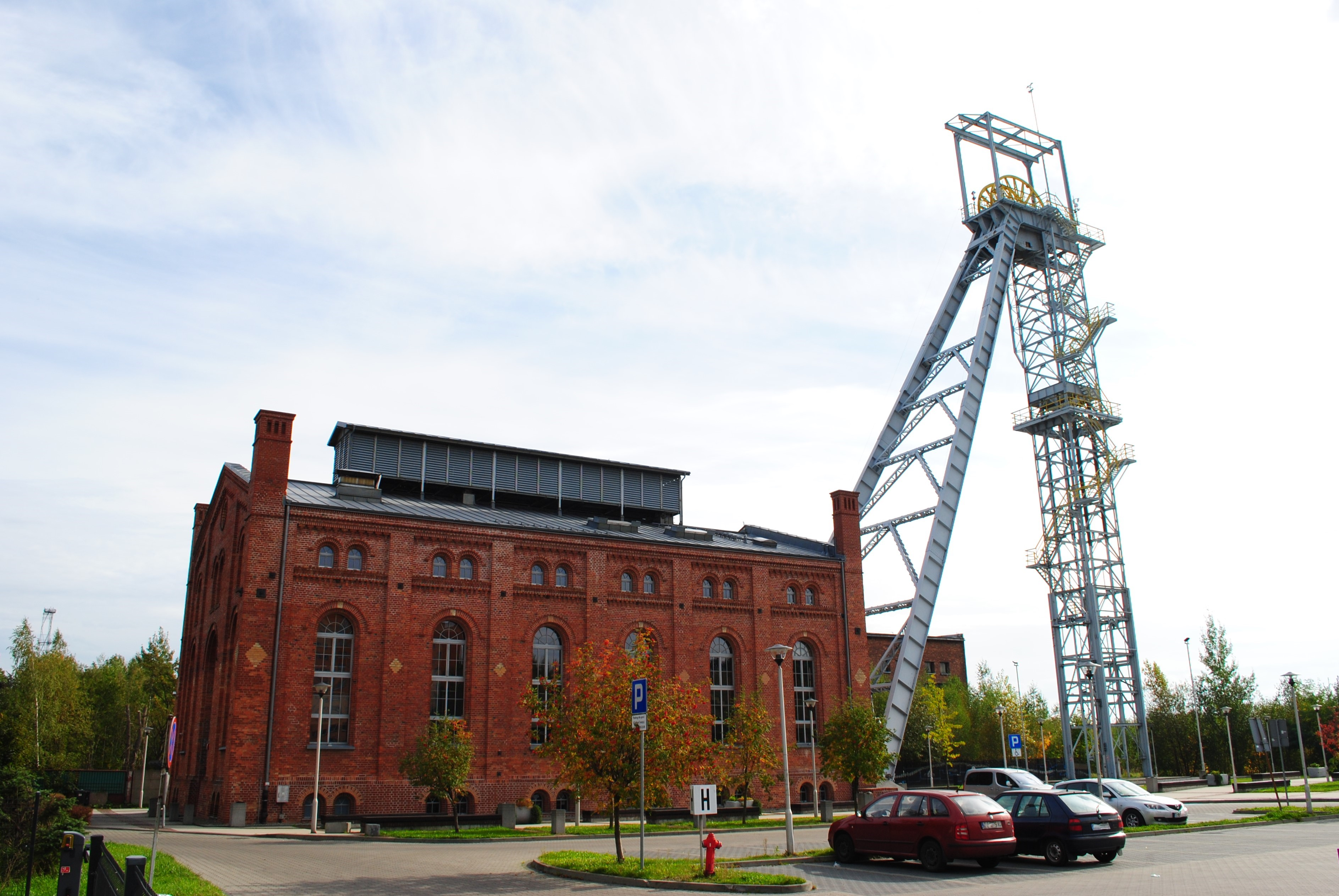
Park Tradycji

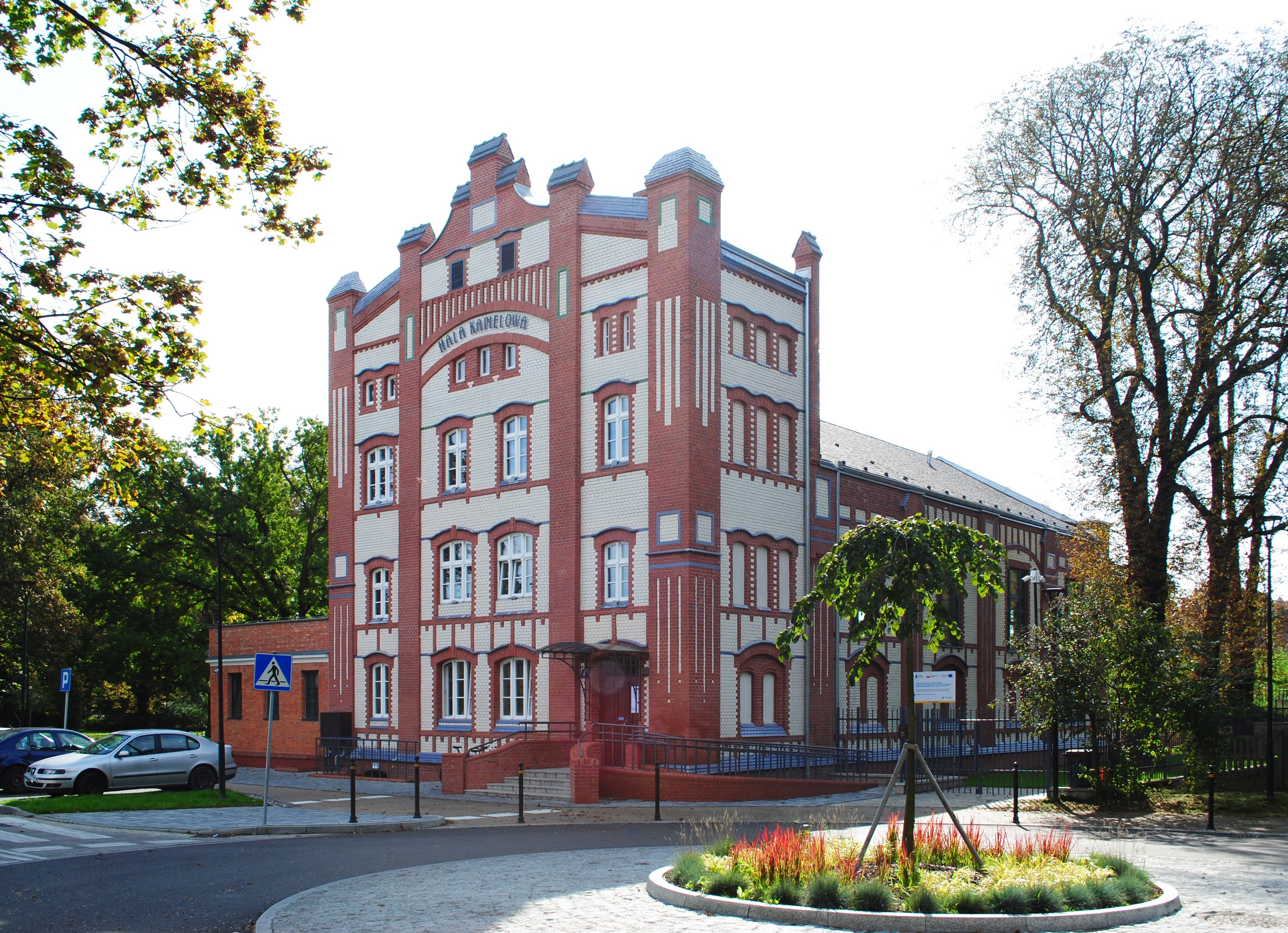
Municipal bath

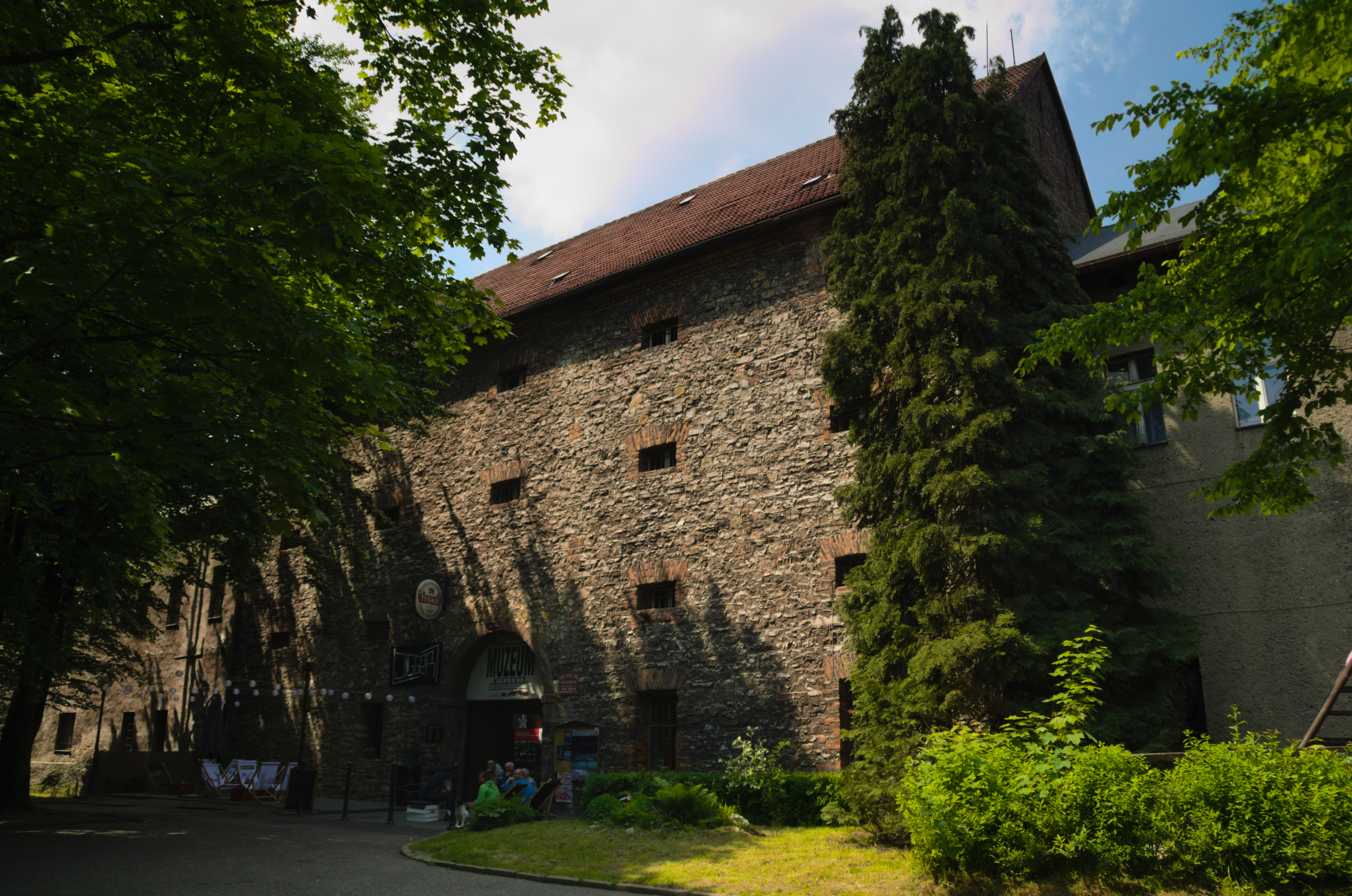
Municipal Museum

Saint Michael Archangel church

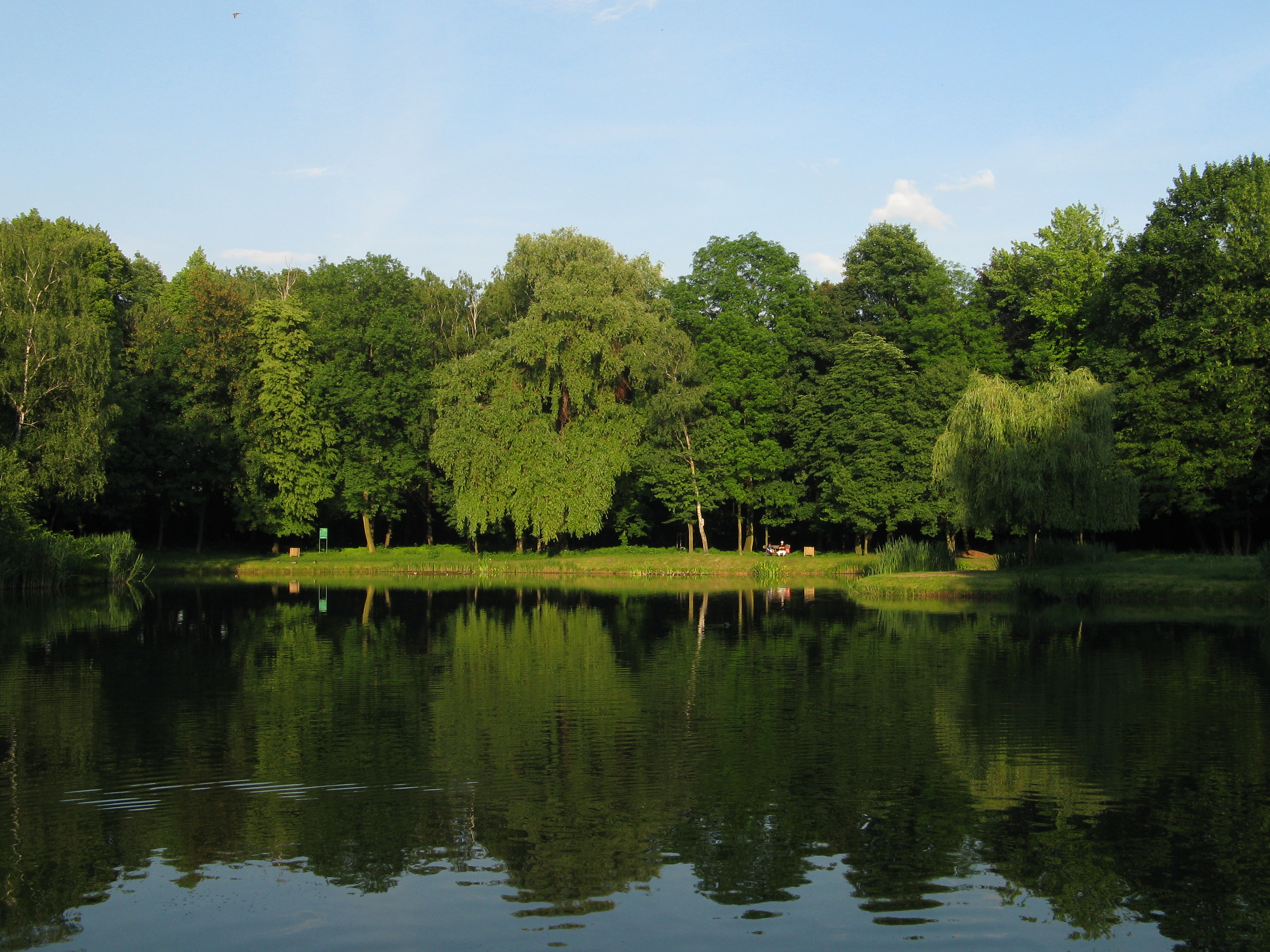
Park Górnik

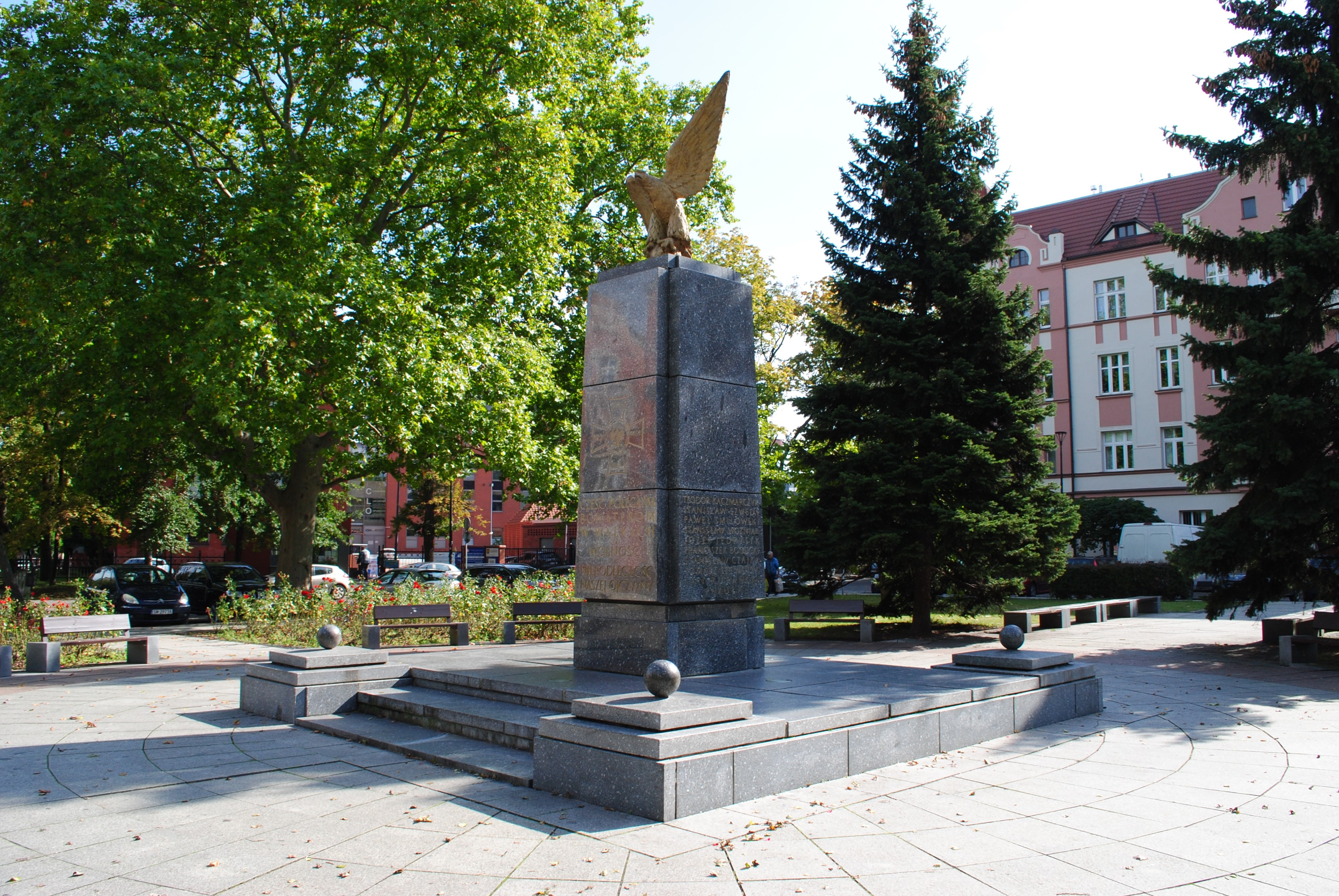
Silesian Uprisings Monument at the Freedom Square

- Bytków TV Tower
- Park Tradycji ("Tradition Park") at the old coal mine
- Municipal Museum in an old granary
- Municipal Bath
- Palace of the Mieroszewskis and Donnersmarcks
- Zameczek Palace (Rheinbaben Palace)
- Town hall
- Saint Michael Archangel church
- Holy Cross church
- Municipal Public Library
- Siemianowice Culture Center
- Brewery

== Parks and squares ==
- Park Miejski ("Municipal Park")
- Park Górnik ("Miner Park")
- Park Pszczelnik
- Planty Michałkowickie
- Skwer Laury ("Laura Square")
- Plac Wolności ("Freedom Square")

== Sports ==
The local football club is MKS Siemianowiczanka. It competes in the lower leagues.

== Notable people ==
- Hugo Henckel von Donnersmarck (1811–1890), German industrialist, founder of Laurahütte
- Ernst Steinitz (1871–1928), German mathematician
- Wojciech Korfanty (1873–1939), Polish politician
- Otto Josef Schlein (1895–1944), German physician
- Michael Jary (1906–1988), German composer
- Heinz A. Lowenstam (1912–1993) German-born, Jewish-American paleoecologist
- Antoni Halor (1937–2011), Polish film director, artist, writer
- Witold Ziaja (born 1940), Polish field hockey player
- Zygmunt Maszczyk (born 1945), Polish footballer
- Józef Skrzek (born 1948), musician, leader of SBB band
- Barbara Blida (1949–2007), Polish politician
- Bronisław Korfanty (born 1952), Polish senator
- Apostolis Anthimos (born 1954), musician
- Henryk Średnicki (1955–2016), Olympic boxer
- Krzysztof Globisz (born 1957), Polish actor
- Daniel Podrzycki (1963–2005), Polish politician
- Jacek Fröhlich (born 1965), Automotive Designer, BMW exterior design chief
- Kryspin Hermański (born 1984), Polish dancer
- Karol Gwóźdź (born 1987), Silesian artist, writer and musician
- Kajetan Duszyński (born 1995), Polish sprinter, Olympic medallist

== Twin towns – sister cities ==
Siemianowice Śląskie is twinned with:

- Câmpia Turzii, Romania
- Jablunkov, Czech Republic
- Köthen, Germany
- Mohács, Hungary
- Wattrelos, France
