= Upper Silesia =

Historical region in Central Europe

Coordinates: 50°N 18°E

Upper Silesia Górny Śląsk (Polish) Gōrny Ślōnsk (Silesian) Horní Slezsko (Czech) Oberschlesien (German)
- Historical region
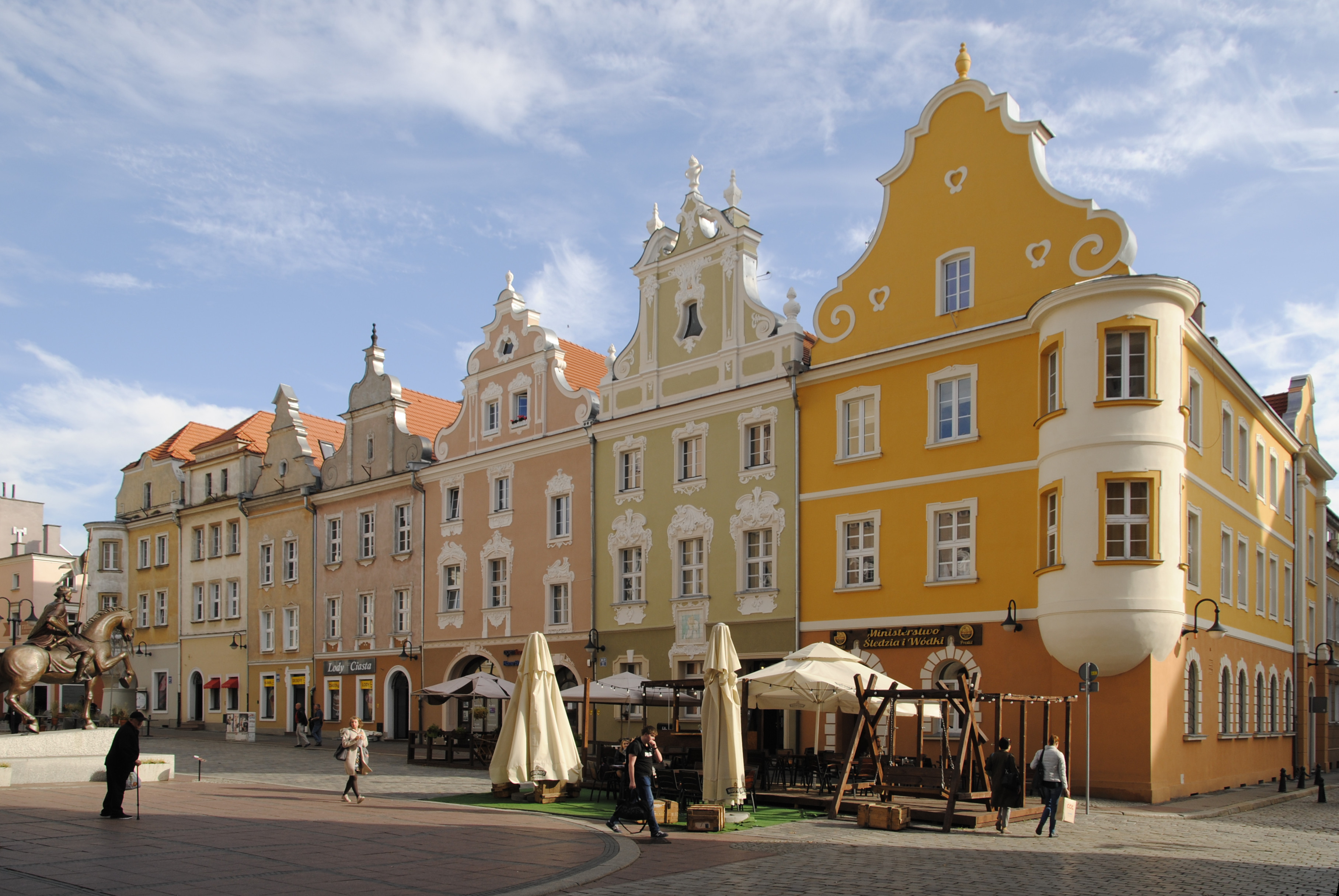
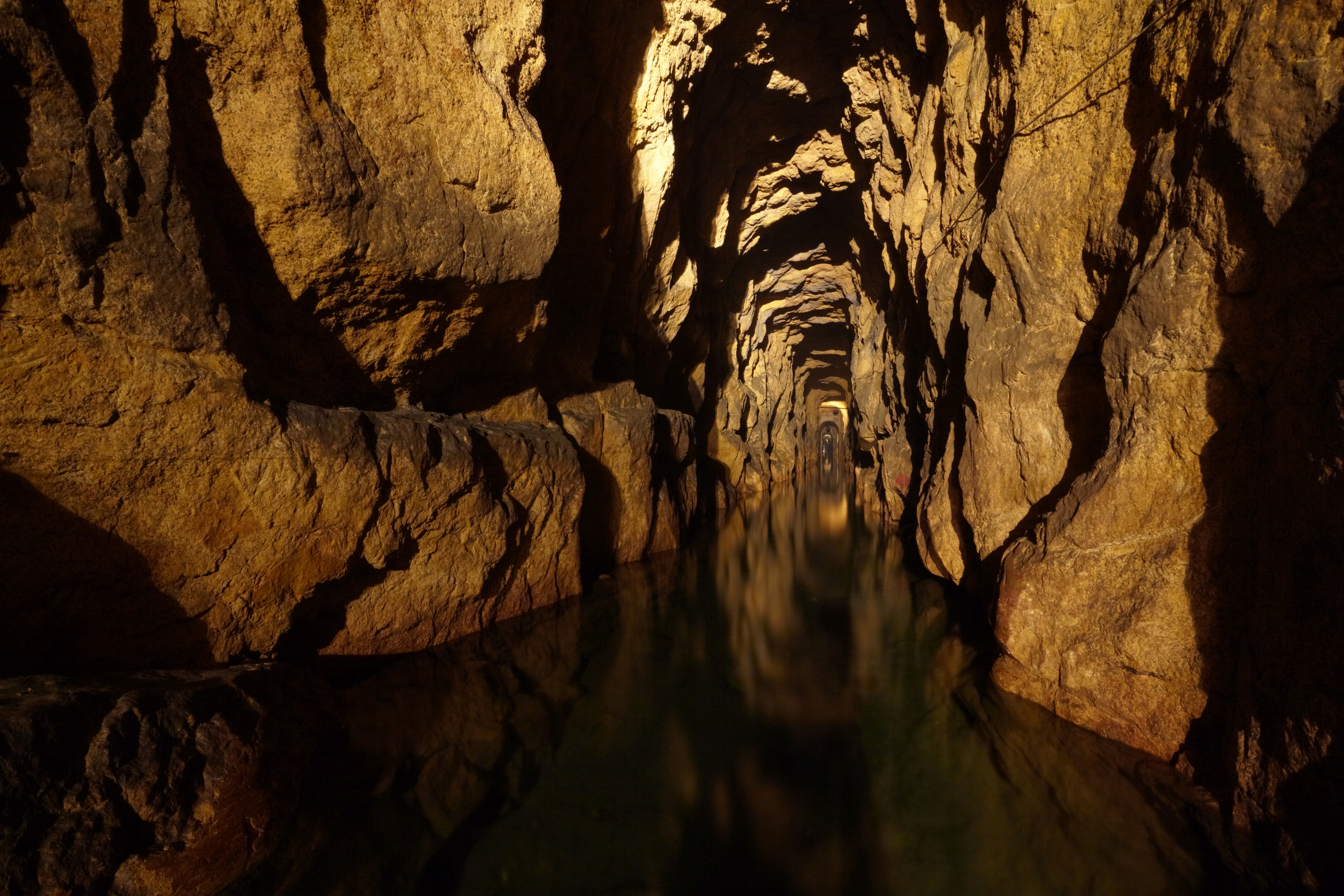
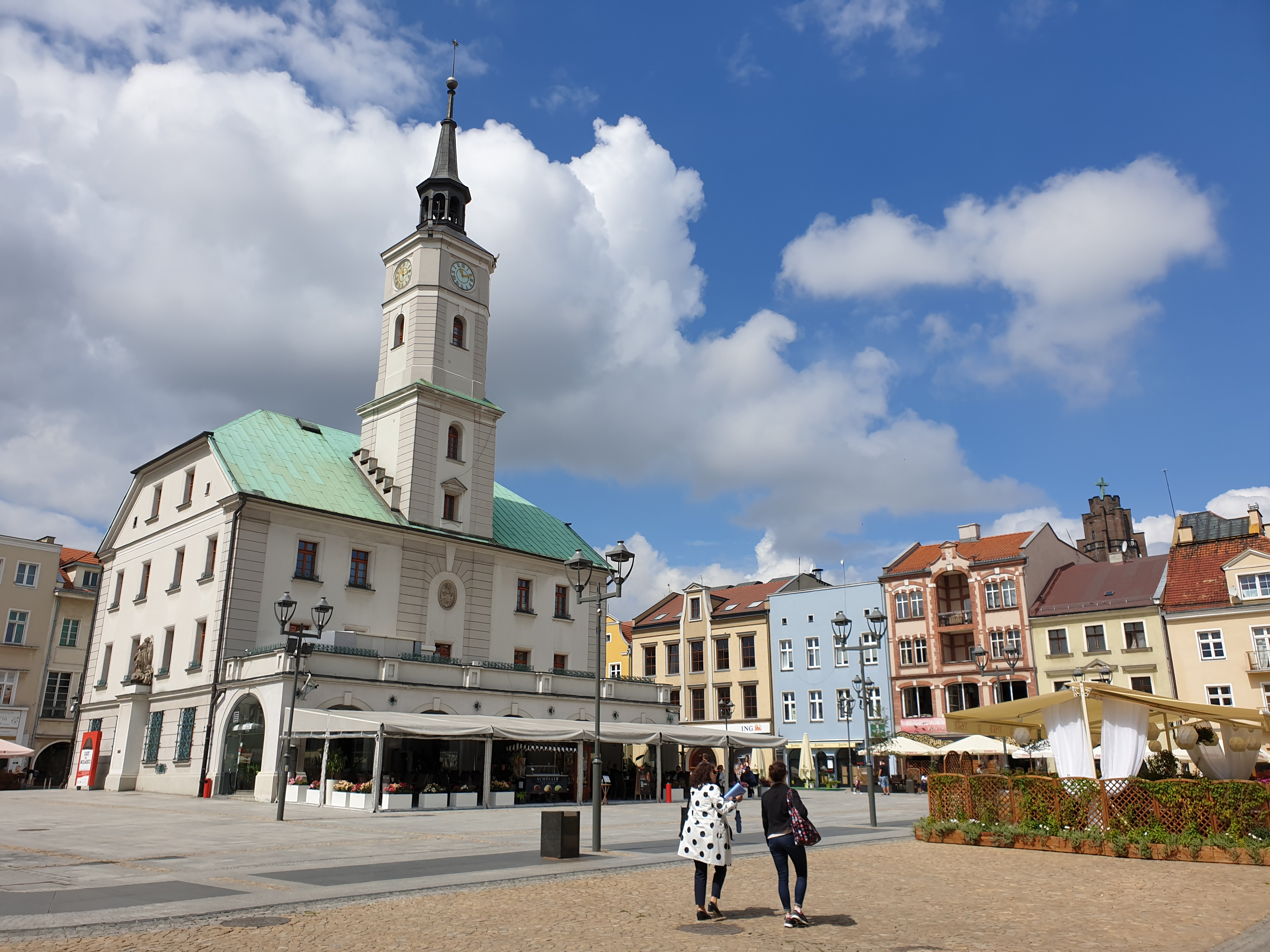
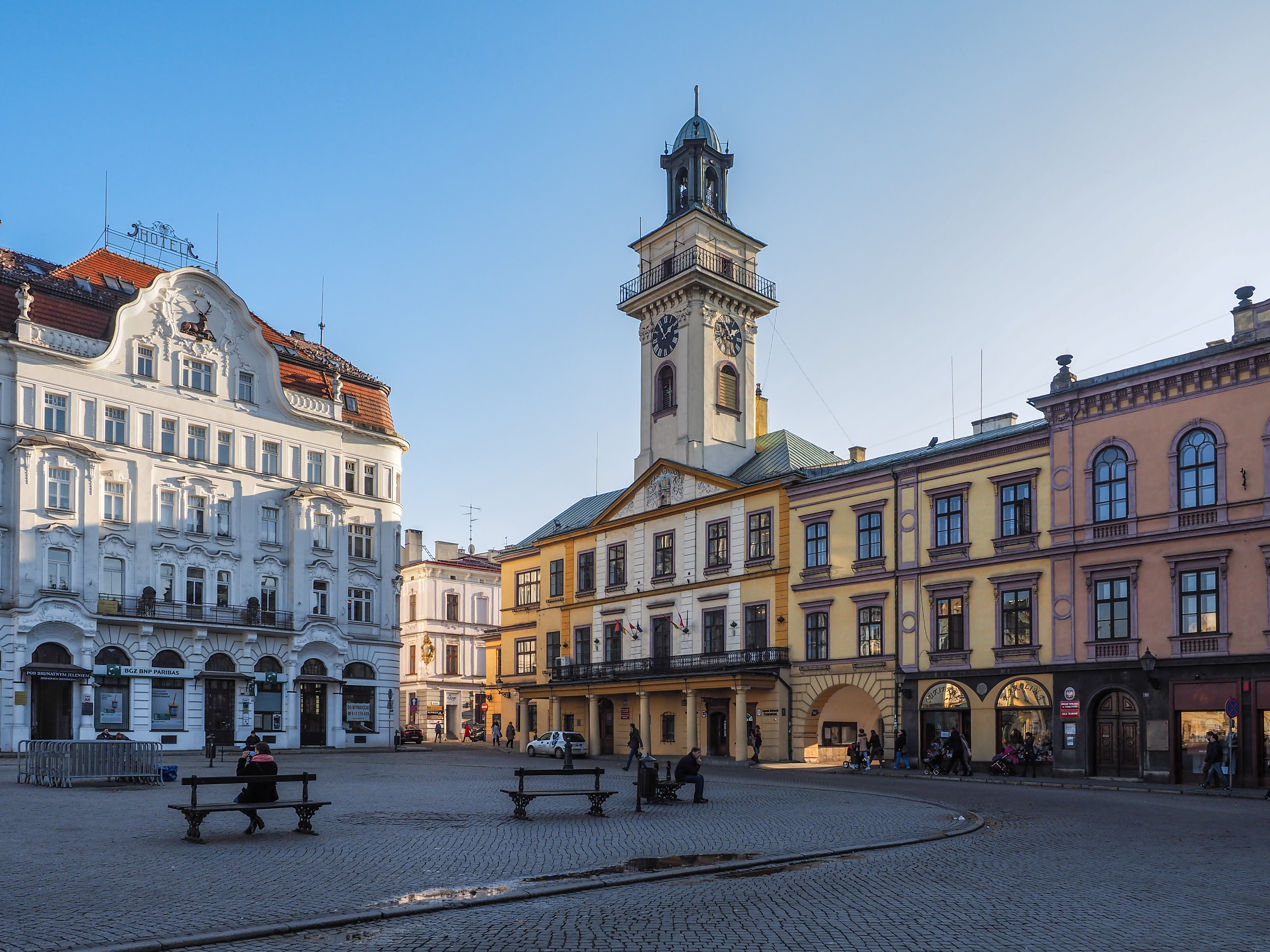
- From top, left to right: Opole Old Town; Historic Silver Mine in Tarnowskie Góry; Gliwice Old Town; Cieszyn Old Town

- Flag Coat of arms

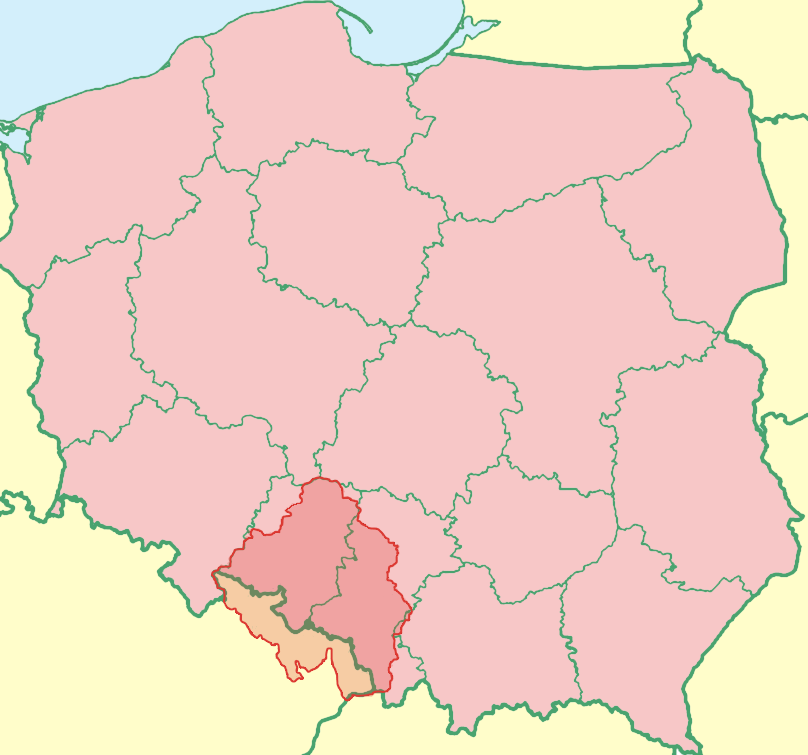
- Location of Upper Silesia on the map of Poland

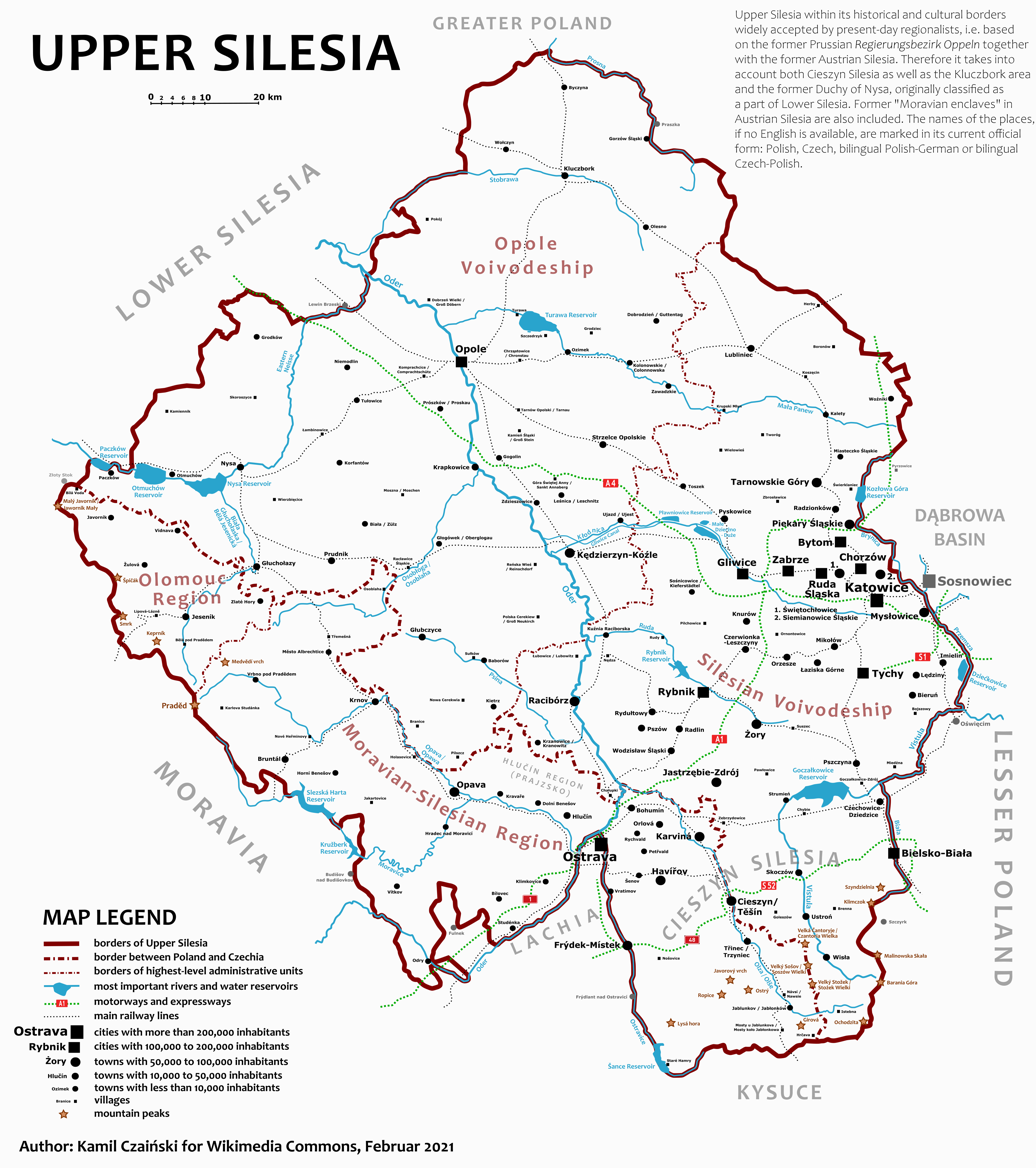
- Contemporary map of Upper Silesia in English
- Countries: Poland; Czech Republic
- Historical capital: Opole
- Largest city: Katowice
- Time zone: UTC+1 (CET)
  - Summer (DST): UTC+2 (CEST)

Upper Silesia (Polish: Górny Śląsk [ˈɡurnɨ ˈɕlɔ̃sk] ; Silesian: Gůrny Ślůnsk, Gōrny Ślōnsk; Czech: Horní Slezsko; German: Oberschlesien [ˈoːbɐˌʃleːzi̯ən] ; Silesian German: Oberschläsing; Latin: Silesia Superior) is the southeastern part of the historical and geographical region of Silesia, located today mostly in Poland, with small parts in the Czech Republic. The area is predominantly known for its heavy industry (mining and metallurgy).

== Geography ==
Upper Silesia is situated on the upper Oder River, north of the Eastern Sudetes mountain range and the Moravian Gate, which form the southern border with the historic Moravia region. Within the adjacent Silesian Beskids to the east, the Vistula River rises and turns eastwards, the Biała and Przemsza tributaries mark the eastern border with Lesser Poland. In the north, Upper Silesia borders on Greater Poland, and in the west on the Lower Silesian lands (the adjacent region around Wrocław also referred to as Middle Silesia).

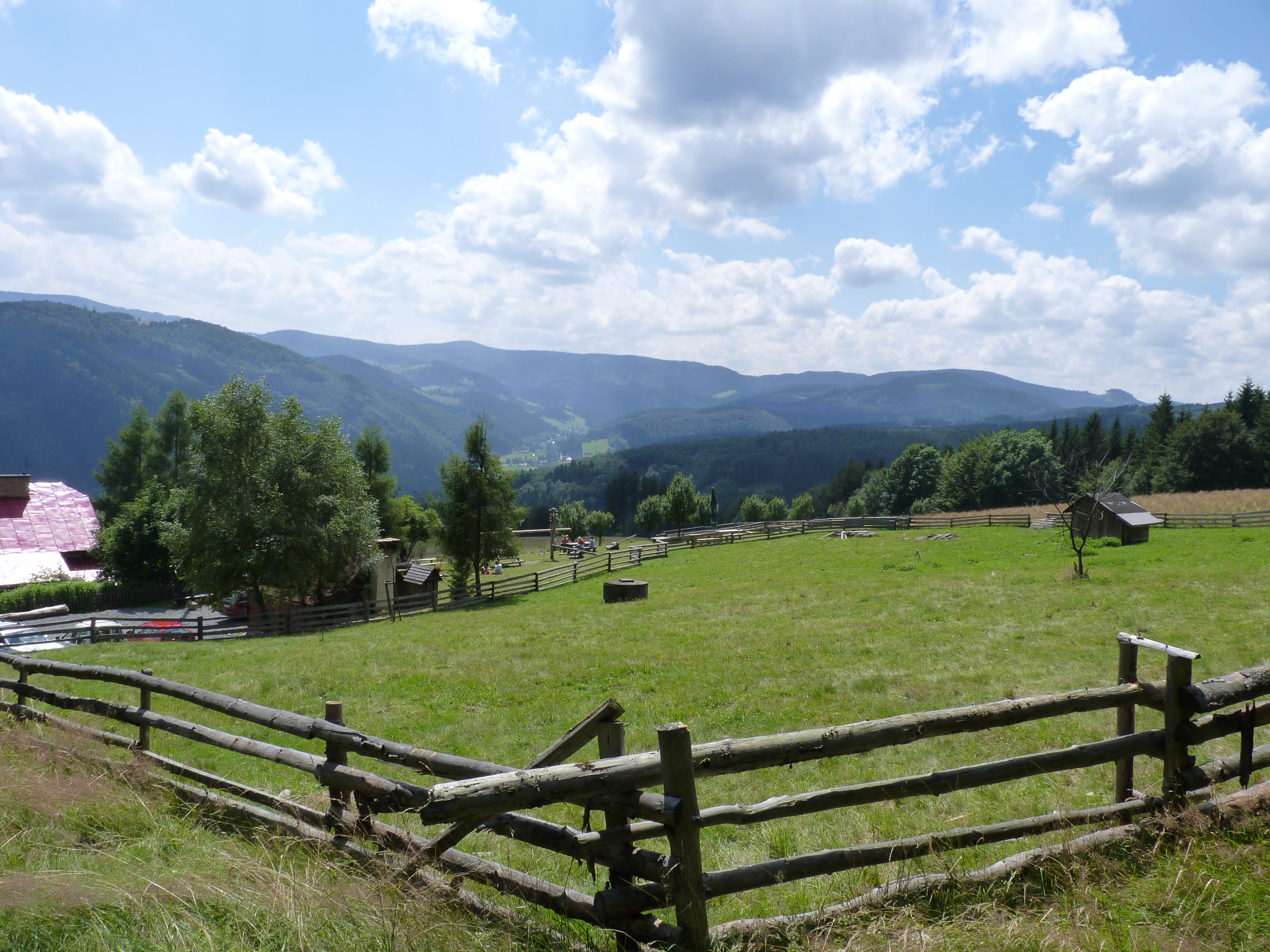
Moravian-Silesian Beskids

It is currently split into a larger Polish and the smaller Czech Silesian part, which is located within the Czech regions of Moravia-Silesia and Olomouc. The Polish Upper Silesian territory covers most of the Opole Voivodeship, except for the Lower Silesian counties of Brzeg and Namysłów, and the western half of the Silesian Voivodeship (except for the Lesser Polish counties of Będzin, Bielsko-Biała, Częstochowa with the city of Częstochowa, Kłobuck, Myszków, Zawiercie and Żywiec, as well as the cities of Dąbrowa Górnicza, Jaworzno and Sosnowiec).

Divided Cieszyn Silesia as well as former Austrian Silesia are historical parts of Upper Silesia.

== History ==
According to the 9th century Bavarian Geographer, the West Slavic Opolanie tribe had settled on the upper Oder River since the days of the Migration Period, centered on the gord of Opole. It is possible that during the times of Prince Svatopluk I (871–894), Silesia was a part of his Great Moravian realm. Upon its dissolution after 906, the region fell under the influence of the Přemyslid rulers of Bohemia, Duke Spytihněv I (894–915) and his brother Vratislaus I (915–921), possibly the founder and name giver of the Silesian capital Wrocław (Czech: Vratislav).

=== Polish rule ===
By 990 the newly installed Piast duke Mieszko I of the Polans had conquered large parts of Silesia. From the Middle Silesia fortress of Niemcza, his son and successor Bolesław I the Brave (992–1025), having established the Diocese of Wrocław, subdued the Upper Silesian lands of the pagan Opolanie, which for several hundred years were part of Poland, though contested by Bohemian dukes like Bretislaus I, who from 1025 invaded Silesia several times. Finally, in 1137, the Polish prince Bolesław III Wrymouth (1107–1138) came to terms with Duke Soběslav I of Bohemia, when a peace was made confirming the border along the Sudetes.

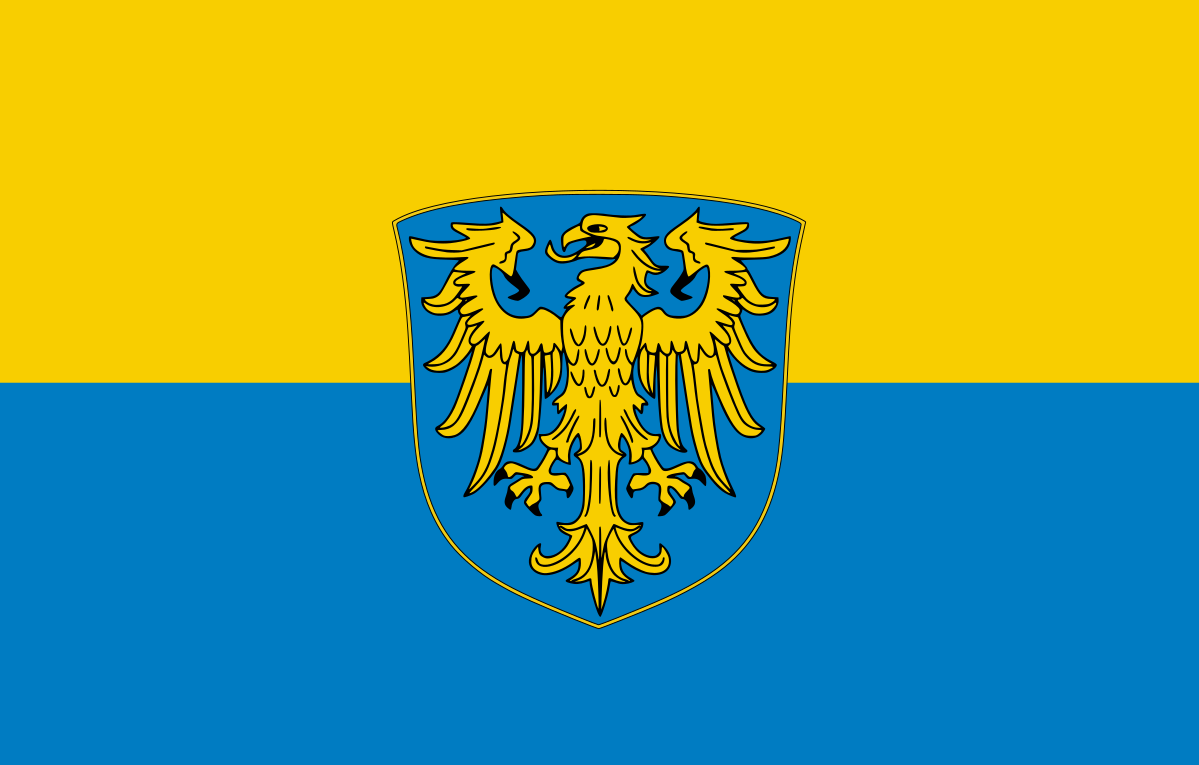
Silesian flag used by Silesians

However, this arrangement fell apart when upon the death of Bolesław III and his testament the fragmentation of Poland began, which decisively enfeebled its central authority. The newly established Duchy of Silesia became the ancestral homeland of the Silesian Piasts, descendants of Bolesław's eldest son Władysław II the Exile, who nevertheless saw themselves barred from the succession to the Polish throne and only were able to regain their Silesian home territory with the aid of the Holy Roman Emperor.

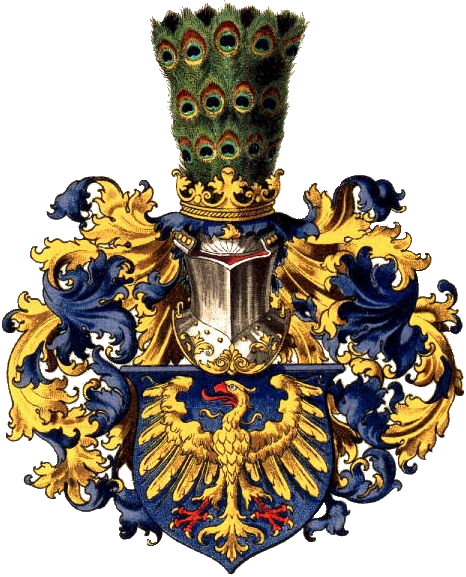
Coat of arms of Upper Silesia as drawn by Hugo Gerard Ströhl (1851–1919)

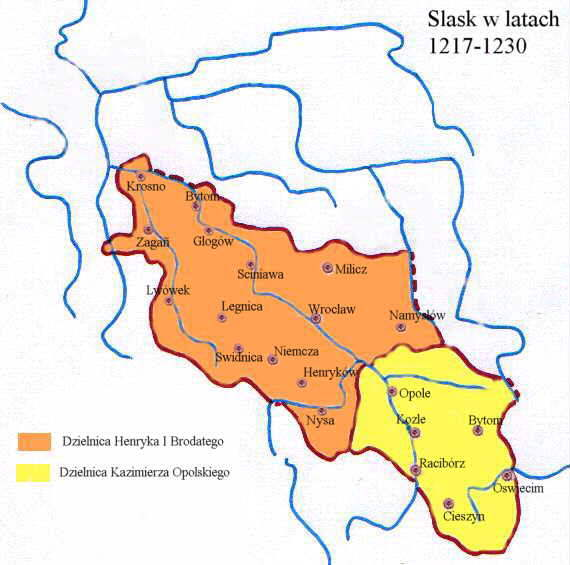
Duchy of Opole–Racibórz under Duke Casimir I (1211-1230)

The failure of the Agnatic seniority principle of inheritance also led to the split-up of the Silesian province itself: in 1172 Władysław's second son Mieszko IV Tanglefoot claimed his rights and received the Upper Silesian Duchy of Racibórz as an allodium from the hands of his elder brother Duke Bolesław I the Tall of Silesia. In the struggle around the Polish throne, Mieszko additionally received the former Lesser Polish lands of Bytom, Oświęcim, Zator, Siewierz and Pszczyna from the new Polish High Duke Casimir II the Just in 1177. When in 1202 Mieszko Tanglefoot had annexed the Duchy of Opole of his deceased nephew Jarosław, he ruled over all Upper Silesia as Duke of Opole and Racibórz.

In the early 13th century the ties of the Silesian Piasts with the neighbouring Holy Roman Empire grew stronger as several dukes married scions of German nobility. Promoted by the Lower Silesian Duke Henry I the Bearded, from 1230 also regent over Upper Silesia for the minor sons of his late cousin Duke Casimir I of Opole, large parts of the Silesian lands were settled with German immigrants in the course of the Ostsiedlung, establishing numerous cities according to German town law. The plans to re-unify Silesia shattered upon the first Mongol invasion of Poland and the death of Duke Henry II the Pious at the 1241 Battle of Legnica. Upper Silesia further fragmented upon the death of Duke Władysław Opolski in 1281 into the duchies of Bytom, Opole, Racibórz and Cieszyn. About 1269 the Duchy of Opava was established on adjacent Moravian territory, ruled by the Přemyslid duke Nicholas I, whose descendants inherited the Duchy of Racibórz in 1336. As they ruled both duchies in personal union, Opava grew into the Upper Silesian territory.

=== Bohemia, Hungary, Austria and Prussia ===
In 1327 the Upper Silesian dukes, like most of their Lower Silesian cousins, had sworn allegiance to King John of Bohemia, thereby becoming vassals of the Bohemian kingdom. During the re-establishment of Poland under King Casimir III the Great, all Silesia was specifically excluded as non-Polish land by the 1335 Treaty of Trentschin becoming a land of the Bohemian Crown and — indirectly — of the Holy Roman Empire. By the mid-14th century, the influx of German settlers into Upper Silesia was stopped by the Black Death pandemic. Unlike in Lower Silesia, the Germanization process was halted; still a majority of the population spoke Polish and Silesian as their native language, often together with German (Silesian German) as a second language. In the southernmost areas, also Lach dialects were spoken. While Latin, Czech and German language were used as official languages in towns and cities, only in the 1550s (during the Protestant Reformation) did records with Polish names start to appear.

Upper Silesia was hit by the Hussite Wars and in 1469 was conquered by King Matthias Corvinus of Hungary, while the Duchies of Oświęcim and Zator fell back to the Polish Crown as a part of Lesser Poland. Upon the death of the Jagiellonian king Louis II in 1526, the Bohemian crown lands were inherited by the Austrian House of Habsburg. In the 16th century, large parts of Silesia had turned Protestant, promoted by reformers like Caspar Schwenckfeld. After the 1620 Battle of White Mountain, the Catholic Emperors of the Habsburg dynasty forcibly re-introduced Catholicism, led by the Jesuits.

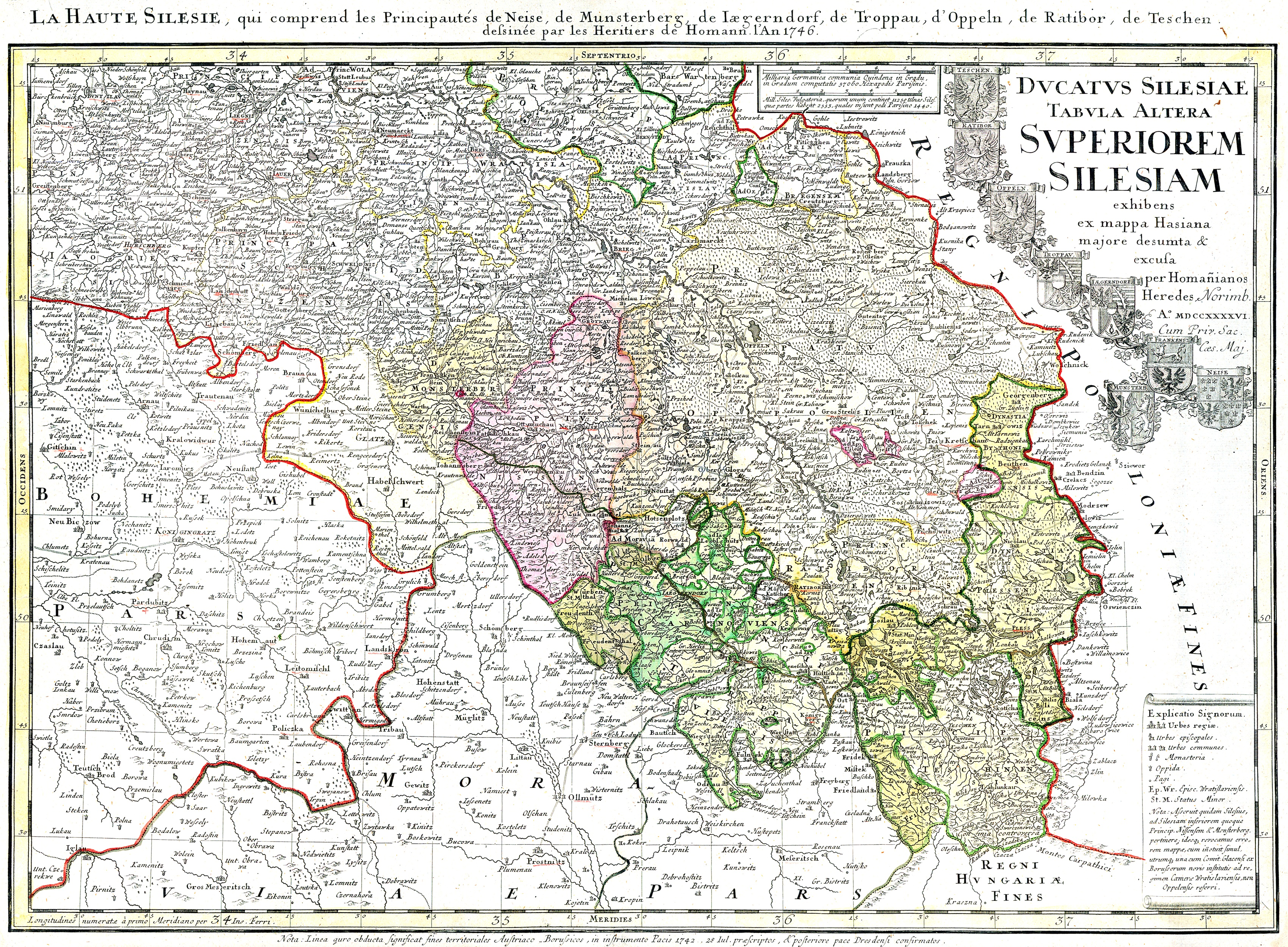
1746 map of Upper Silesia, Homann heirs, Nuremberg

Lower Silesia and most of Upper Silesia were occupied by the Kingdom of Prussia in 1742 during the First Silesian War and annexed by the terms of the Treaty of Breslau. A small part south of the Opava River remained within the Habsburg-ruled Bohemian Crown as the "Duchy of Upper and Lower Silesia", colloquially called Austrian Silesia. Incorporated into the Prussian Silesia Province from 1815, Upper Silesia became an industrial area taking advantage of its plentiful coal and iron ore. Prussian Upper Silesia became a part of the German Empire in 1871.

=== Ethnolinguistic structure before the plebiscite ===
The earliest exact census figures on ethnolinguistic or national structure (Nationalverschiedenheit) of the Prussian part of Upper Silesia, come from year 1819. The last pre-WW1 general census figures available, are from 1910 (if not including the 1911 census of school children - Sprachzählung unter den Schulkindern - which revealed a higher percent of Polish-speakers among school children than the 1910 census among the general populace). Figures (Table 1.) show that large demographic changes took place between 1819 and 1910, with the region's total population quadrupling, the percent of German-speakers increasing significantly, and that of Polish-speakers declining considerably. Also, the total land area in which Polish language was spoken, as well as the land area in which it was spoken by the majority, declined between 1790 and 1890. Polish authors before 1918 estimated the number of Poles in Prussian Upper Silesia as slightly higher than according to official German censuses.

Table 1. Numbers of Polish, German and other inhabitants (Regierungsbezirk Oppeln)
Year	1819	1828	1831	1834	1837	1840	1843	1846	1852	1855	1858	1861	1867	1890	1900	1905	1910
Polish	377,100 (67.2%)	418,837 (61.1%)	443,084 (62.0%)	468,691 (62.6%)	495,362 (62.1%)	525,395 (58.6%)	540,402 (58.1%)	568,582 (58.1%)	584,293 (58.6%)	590,248 (58.7%)	612,849 (57.3%)	665,865 (59.1%)	742,153 (59.8%)	918,728 (58.2%)	1,048,230 (56.1%)	1,158,805 (57.0%)	Census, monolingual Polish: 1,169,340 (53.0%) or up to 1,560,000 together with bilinguals
German	162,600 (29.0%)	255,483 (37.3%)	257,852 (36.1%)	266,399 (35.6%)	290,168 (36.3%)	330,099 (36.8%)	348,094 (37.4%)	364,175 (37.2%)	363,990 (36.5%)	366,562 (36.5%)	406,950 (38.1%)	409,218 (36.3%)	457,545 (36.8%)	566,523 (35.9%)	684,397 (36.6%)	757,200 (37.2%)	884,045 (40.0%)
Other	21,503 (3.8%)	10,904 (1.6%)	13,254 (1.9%)	13,120 (1.8%)	12,679 (1.6%)	41,570 (4.6%)	42,292 (4.5%)	45,736 (4.7%)	49,445 (4.9%)	48,270 (4.8%)	49,037 (4.6%)	51,187 (4.6%)	41,611 (3.4%)	92,480 (5.9%)	135,519 (7.3%)	117,651 (5.8%)	Total population: 2,207,981

United States Immigration Commission in 1911 classified Polish-speaking Silesians as Poles.

=== Interbellum, World War II, and post-war period ===
In 1919, after World War I, Polish miners organized large protests in Mysłowice. On August 15, 1919, the German Grenzschutz opened fire on protesting Polish miners and their families, killing seven miners, two women and a 13-year-old boy. The event, known as the "Mysłowice massacre", sparked the First Silesian Uprising against Germany.

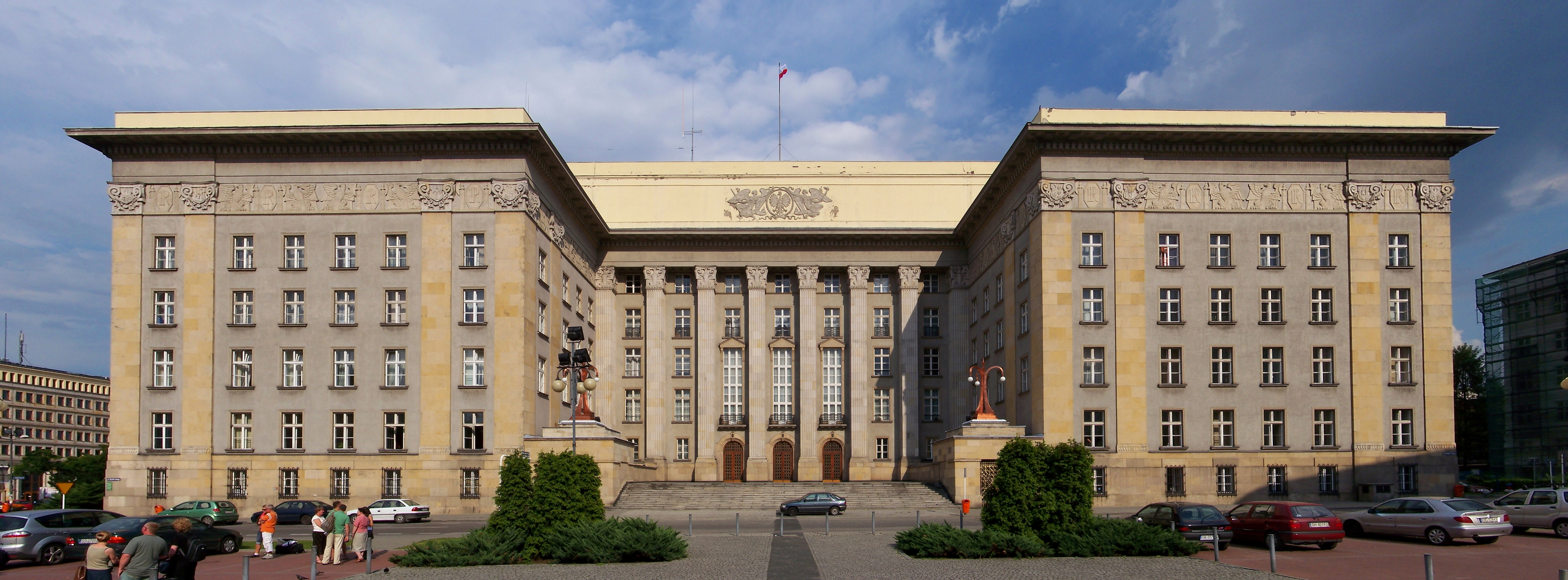
Silesian Parliament in Katowice

Soon afterwards, the eastern part of Upper Silesia (with a majority of ethnic Poles) came under Polish rule as the Silesian Voivodeship, while the mostly German-speaking western part remained part of the Weimar Republic as the newly established Upper Silesia Province. In early 1919, the Polish–Czechoslovak War broke out around Cieszyn Silesia, whereafter Czechoslovakia gained the Trans-Olza strip in addition to the Hlučín Region.

From 1919 to 1921 three Silesian Uprisings occurred among the Polish-speaking populace of Upper Silesia; the Battle of Annaberg was fought in the region in 1921. In the Upper Silesia plebiscite of March 1921, a majority of 59.4% voted against merging with Poland and a minority of 40.6% voted for, with clear lines dividing Polish and German communities. The plan to divide the region was suggested by the Inter-Allied Commission on Upper Silesia, headed by the French general Henri Le Rond. The plan was decided by an ambassadors conference in Paris on 20 October 1921. The exact border, the maintenance of cross-border railway traffic and other necessary co-operations, as well as equal rights for all inhabitants in both parts of Upper Silesia, were all fixed by the German-Polish Accord on East Silesia, signed in Geneva on 15 May 1922. On 20 June 1922 the Weimar Republic ceded the East Upper Silesia region to Poland. The area became part of Silesian Voivodeship of the Second Polish Republic.

The new border only partly followed the results of the referendum. The reason was that closely following the local majority vote would have resulted in a plurality of enclaves and would thus not have been a viable border. Particularly in the Upper Silesian Industrial Region, the border line was often bizarre, cutting right through settlements or through industrial facilities.

Division of Prussian Silesia between Weimar Germany, Poland and Czechoslovakia after World War I
Division of:	Area in 1910 (km^{2})	Share of territory	Population in 1910	After WW1 part of:	Notes
Lower Silesia	27,105 km^{2}	100%	3,017,981	Divided between:	
to Poland	526 km^{2}	2%	1%	Poznań Voivodeship (Niederschlesiens Ostmark)	(Note: After World War I Poland received a small part of historical Lower Silesia, with majority ethnic Polish population as of year 1918. That area included parts of counties Syców (German: Polnisch Wartenberg), Namysłów, Góra and Milicz. In total around 526 square kilometers with around 30 thousand inhabitants, including the city of Rychtal. Too small to form its own voivodeship, the area was incorporated to Poznań Voivodeship (former Province of Posen).)
to Germany	26,579 km^{2}	98%	99%	Province of Lower Silesia	
Upper Silesia	13,230 km^{2}	100%	2,207,981	Divided between:	
to Poland	3,225 km^{2}	25%	41%	Silesian Voivodeship	(Note: Interwar Silesian Voivodeship was formed from Prussian East Upper Silesia (area 3,225 km^{2}) and Polish part of Austrian Cieszyn Silesia (1,010 km^{2}), in total 4,235 km^{2}. After the annexation of Trans-Olza from Czechoslovakia in 1938, it increased to 5,122 km^{2}. Silesian Voivodeship's capital was Katowice.)
to Czechoslovakia	325 km^{2}	2%	2%	Hlučín Region	
to Germany	9,680 km^{2}	73%	57%	Province of Upper Silesia	

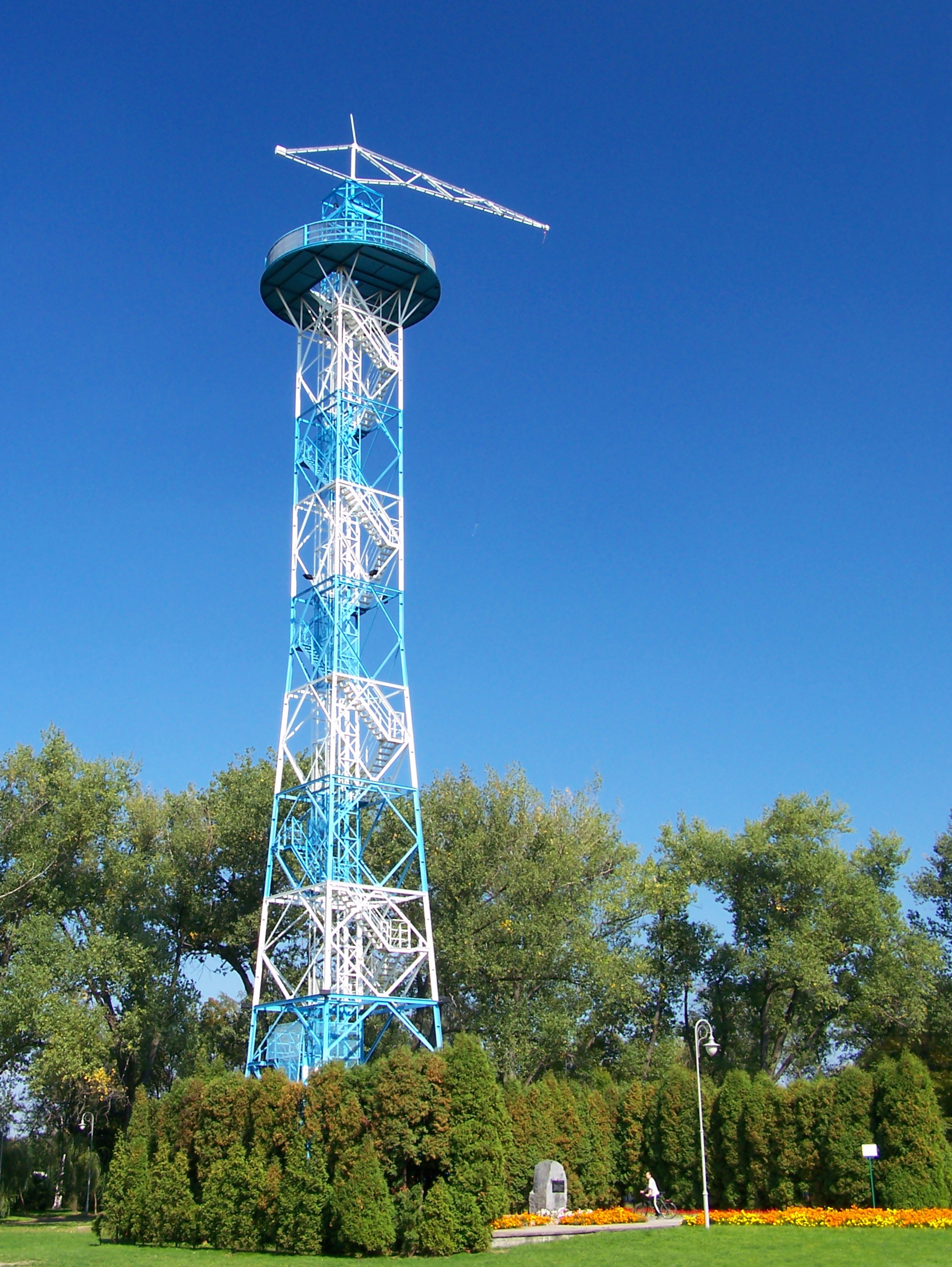
Parachute Tower in Katowice, one of the symbols of the Polish Defense of Katowice in 1939

During the German invasion of Poland, which started World War II in September 1939, German troops committed numerous massacres of Polish civilians in the region, including at Gostyń, Łaziska Górne, Jankowice, Zgoń, Lędziny, Świętochłowice, Katowice, Pasternik, Pszczyna, Siemianowice Śląskie and Wyry. Afterwards, Polish Silesia was annexed to the Nazi German Reich as part of the Gau of Silesia. The Polish population was subjected to further persecution and crimes. A network of Polenlager forced labour camps was established in the region, and multiple subcamp of the Auschwitz concentration camp. The Germans operated the Stalag VIII-B, Stalag VIII-D and Stalag VIII-F prisoner-of-war camps for Polish, French, Belgian, British, Serbian and other Allied POWs, with numerous forced labour subcamps, in the region. In 1941 Upper and Lower Silesia were split into separate Gaue.

After 1945, almost all of Upper Silesia that was not ceded to Poland in 1922 was placed under the administration of the Republic of Poland. German civilians, as well as Nazi criminals, were interned in labor camps such as the Zgoda labour camp. The majority of the German-speaking population that had not fled was expelled, an activity that was euphemized as "transfers [to] be effected in an orderly and humane manner" in accordance with the decision of the victorious Allied powers at their 1945 meeting at Potsdam. The German expellees were transported to the present-day Germany (including the former East Germany), and Polish migrants, a sizeable part of whom were themselves expelleés from former Polish provinces taken over by the USSR in the east, settled in Upper Silesia. A good many German-speaking Upper Silesians were relocated in Bavaria. A small part of Upper Silesia stayed as part of Czechoslovakia as Czech Silesia.

The expulsions of German-speakers did not totally eliminate the presence of a population that considered itself German. In contrast to the situation in Lower Silesia, where almost the totality of the pre-war population that was expelled was exclusively German-speaking (only about 50-60% of the population of Upper Silesia was displaced to Germany, while over 95-97% of population of Lower Silesia was displaced), the pre-war population of Upper Silesia was in considerable number Roman Catholic mixed bilingual that spoke both German and Polish dialects, and their Polish linguistic skills were considered solid enough for them to be kept in the area (Aleksandra Kunce, Being at Home in a Place: The Philosophy of Localness, pp. 41–112). Firstly, after the war, Poles displaced from Polish territories incorporated into the USSR settled in Upper Silesia, but also Polish settlers from other overpopulated parts of Poland. And later, in the years 1945-1989, a large number of Poles from various parts of Poland settled in Upper Silesia, who received work, e.g. in the mines.

The area formally became part of the Republic of Poland by virtue of the German-Polish border treaty of 14 November 1990. With the fall of communism and Poland's joining the European Union, there were enough of these remaining in Upper Silesia to allow for the recognition of the German minority in Poland by the Polish government.

== Major cities and towns ==
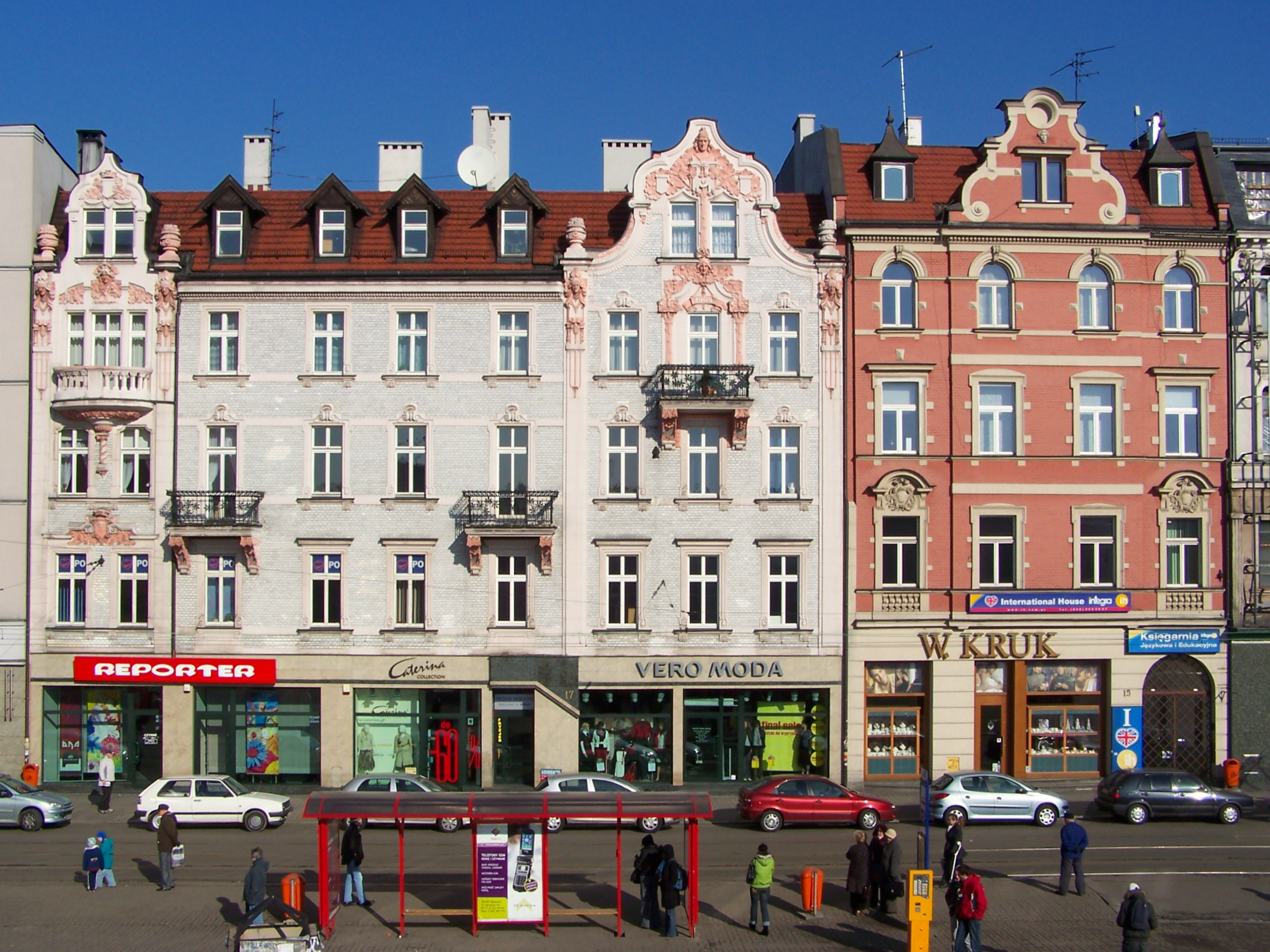
Katowice

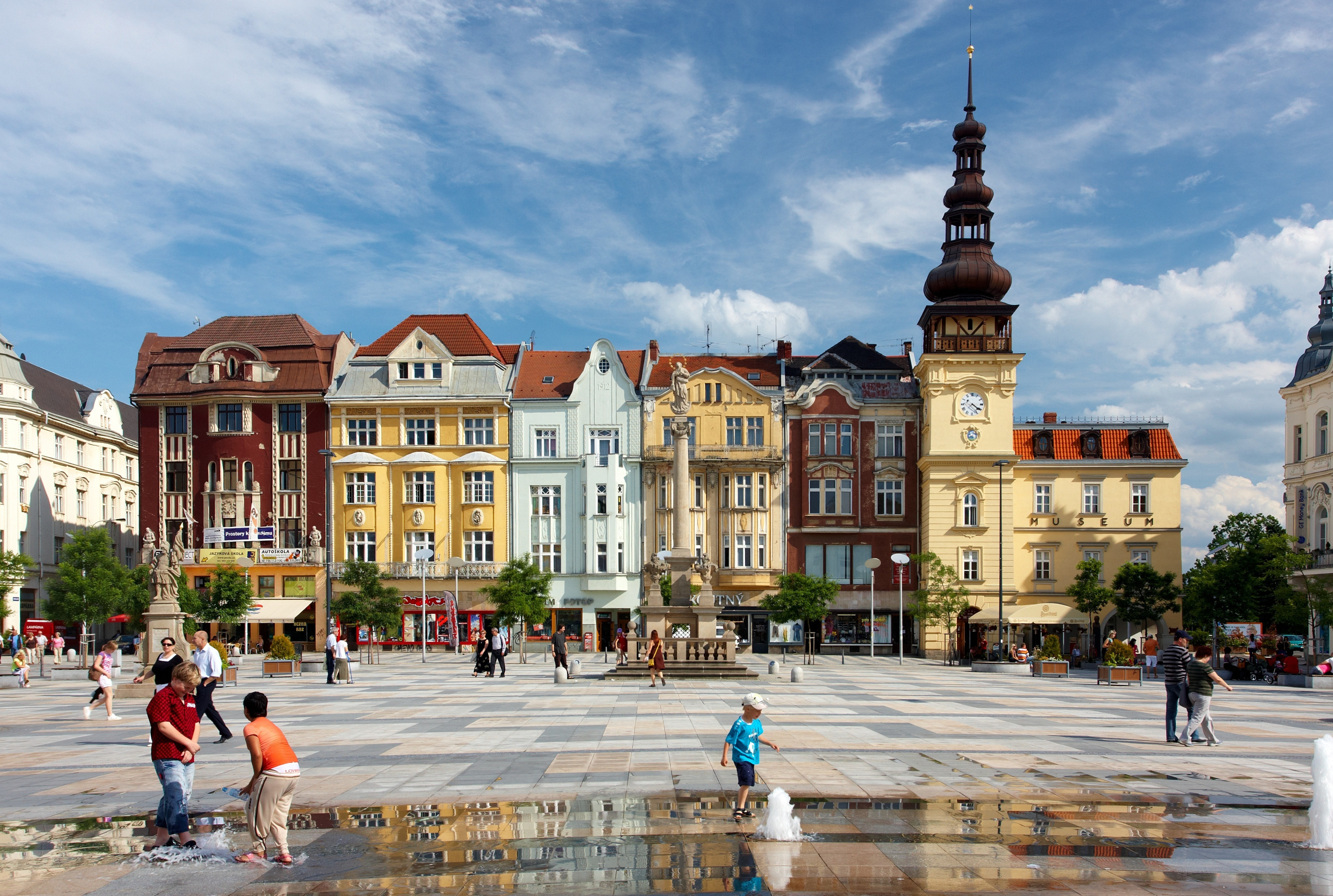
Ostrava

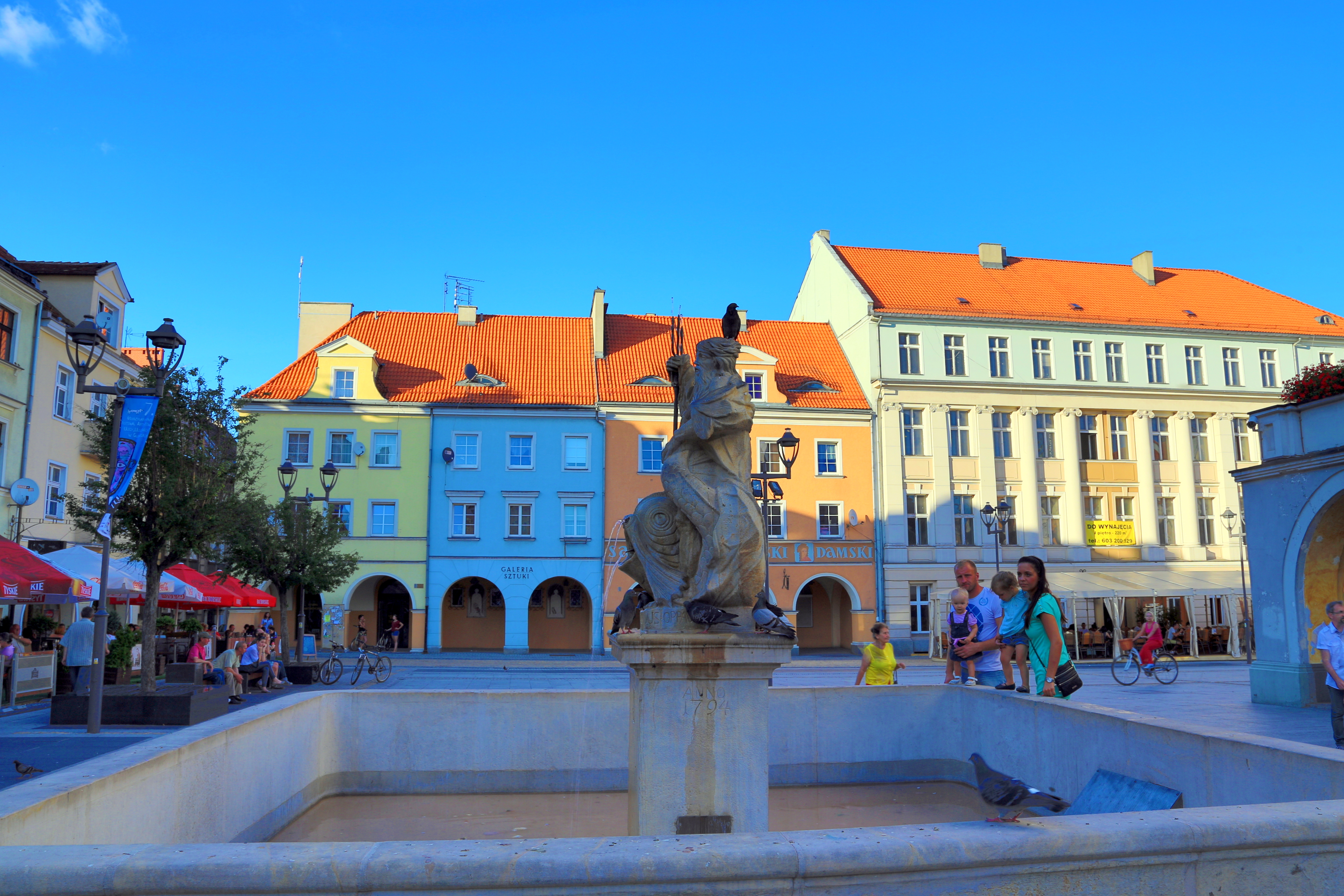
Gliwice

The historical capital of Upper Silesia is Opole, nevertheless the largest towns of the region, including Katowice, are located in the Upper Silesian Industrial Region, the total population of which is about 2,500,000.

As of 2022, the following cities and towns have over 20,000 inhabitants:

- Katowice (281,418)
- Ostrava (279,791) – Czech Republic (eastern districts of former Slezská Ostrava)
- Gliwice (171,896)
- Bielsko-Biała (167,509) (only Bielsko, Biała is part of Lesser Poland)
- Zabrze (156,082)
- Frýdek-Místek (53 938) – Czech Republic
- Bytom (150,594)
- Rybnik (132,266)
- Ruda Śląska (132,040)
- Opole (126,623)
- Tychy (123,562)
- Chorzów (102,564)
- Jastrzębie-Zdrój (83,477)
- Mysłowice (71,849)
- Havířov (69,084) – Czech Republic
- Siemianowice Śląskie (64,139)
- Żory (61,835)
- Tarnowskie Góry (61,413)
- Kędzierzyn-Koźle (55,623)
- Opava (54,840) – Czech Republic
- Nysa (54,514)
- Piekary Śląskie (52,396)
- Racibórz (50,419)
- Karviná (49,881) – Czech Republic
- Świętochłowice (45,972)
- Wodzisław Śląski (45,316)
- Mikołów (41,383)
- Czechowice-Dziedzice (34,972)
- Cieszyn (33,486)
- Orlová (28,206) – Czech Republic
- Pszczyna (25,308)
- Český Těšín (23,468) – Czech Republic
- Lubliniec (23,406)
- Krnov (22,665) – Czech Republic
- Kluczbork (22,418)
- Łaziska Górne (21,371)
- Bohumín (20,450) – Czech Republic
- Rydułtowy (20,436)

== Culture ==
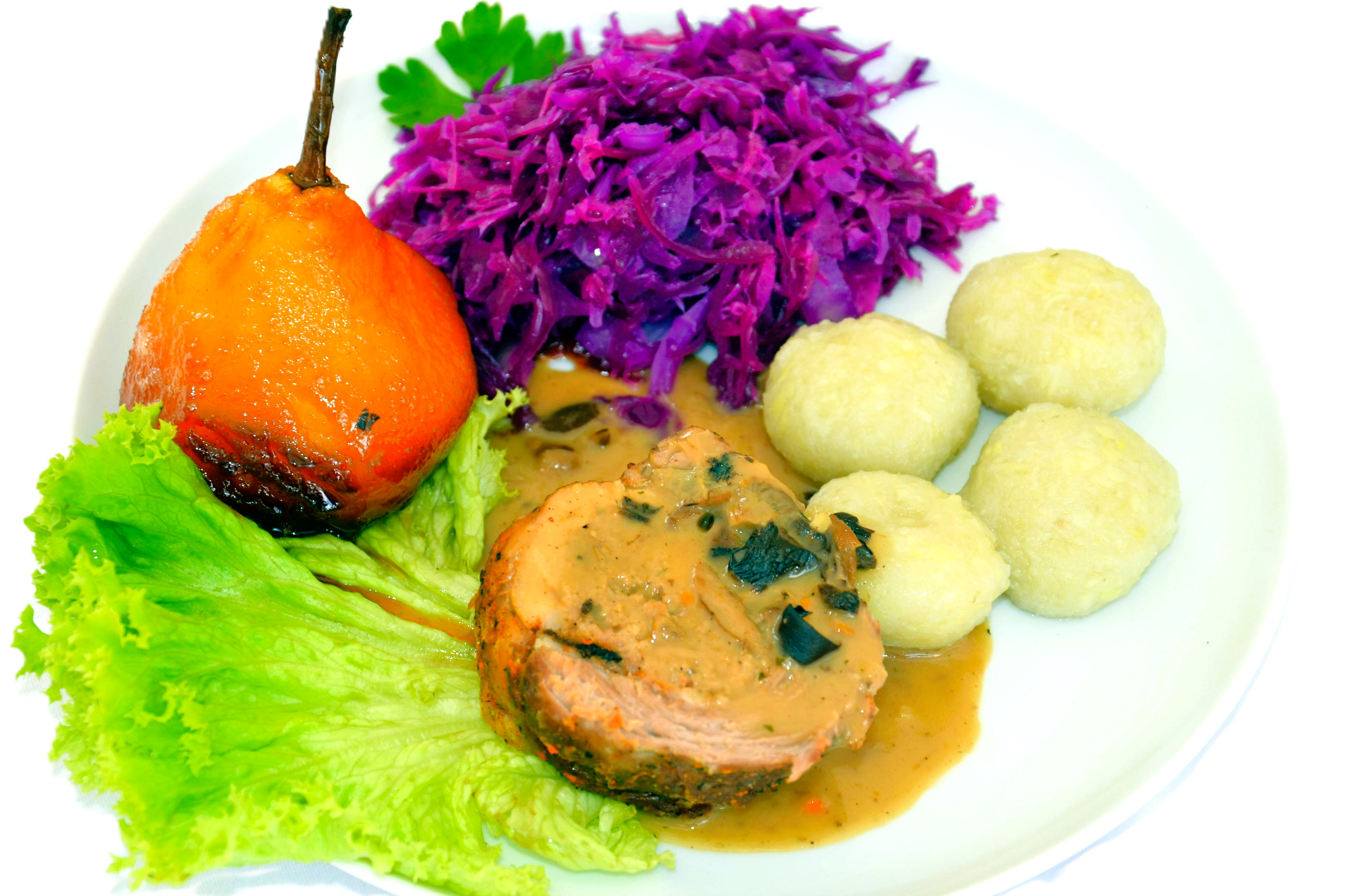
Silesian dumplings

=== Silesian cuisine ===
Upper Silesian cuisine belongs to Central European cuisines and is therefore characterized by high calorific value of dishes. For centuries, Polish, Czech and German cuisine was mixed here. Typical Upper Silesian dishes are consumed here, as well as dishes that are also present in Lesser Poland and Greater Poland at the same time. In the second half of the twentieth century, dishes from the Polish borderland cuisine (potato pancakes, dumplings with cheese, red borscht, bigos) gained popularity in Upper Silesia.

=== Clothes ===
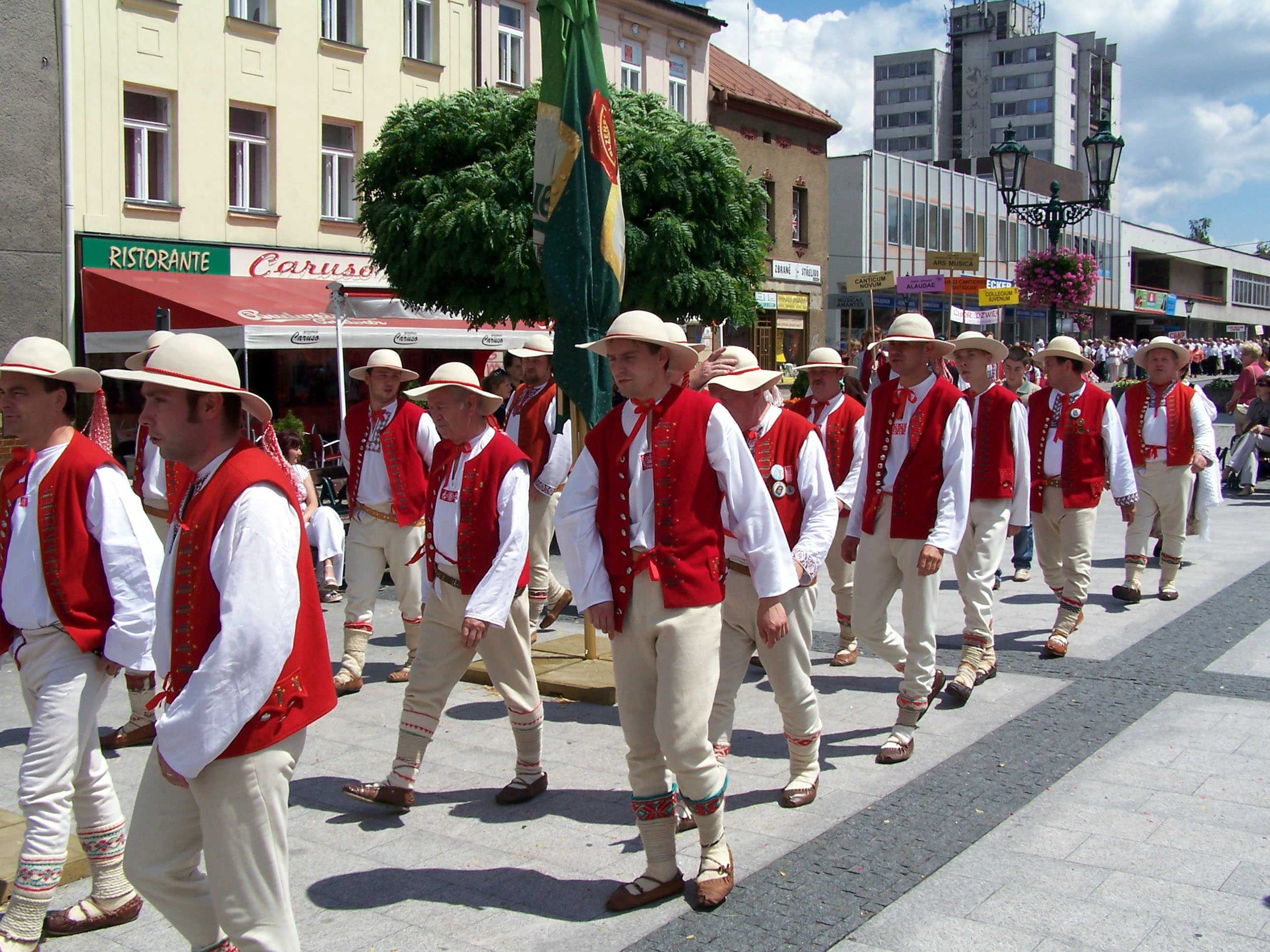
Silesian gorals

Silesian women's clothes vary depending on the region and even the individual towns and villages they come from. The ways of dressing intertwined with the movement of people in the 19th and 20th century. The inhabitants of Silesia also started to adapt their outfits to the urban fashion, which changed the appearance of the outfit even more.

The men's outfit consists of a shacket, a shirt (vest), a white shirt, a silk shirt (silk scarf) or a dressing gown (ribbons), galot (trousers) or bizoków (trousers ironed to the edge) and szczewików (shoes). The man's costume is now called an ancug, this name is mainly associated with a suit.

=== Crafts ===
In Upper Silesia, metallurgy, mining and other heavy industry branches are developed.

Agriculture plays a secondary role, developed mainly in Opole Silesia.

=== Architecture ===
- Familok

=== Media ===
On the territory of Upper Silesia, TVP Info broadcasts the regional channels TVP Opole and TVP Katowice of the public Polish Television. In addition, the private television station TVS is aimed at viewers in the Silesian Voivodeship. Another channel is TVT.

Regionally oriented radio stations are Polskie Radio Opole and Polskie Radio Katowice of the state radio station. A private Upper Silesian station is Radio Piekary.

Radio Mittendrin is a German-Polish Internet radio station of the German minority.

== Sports ==
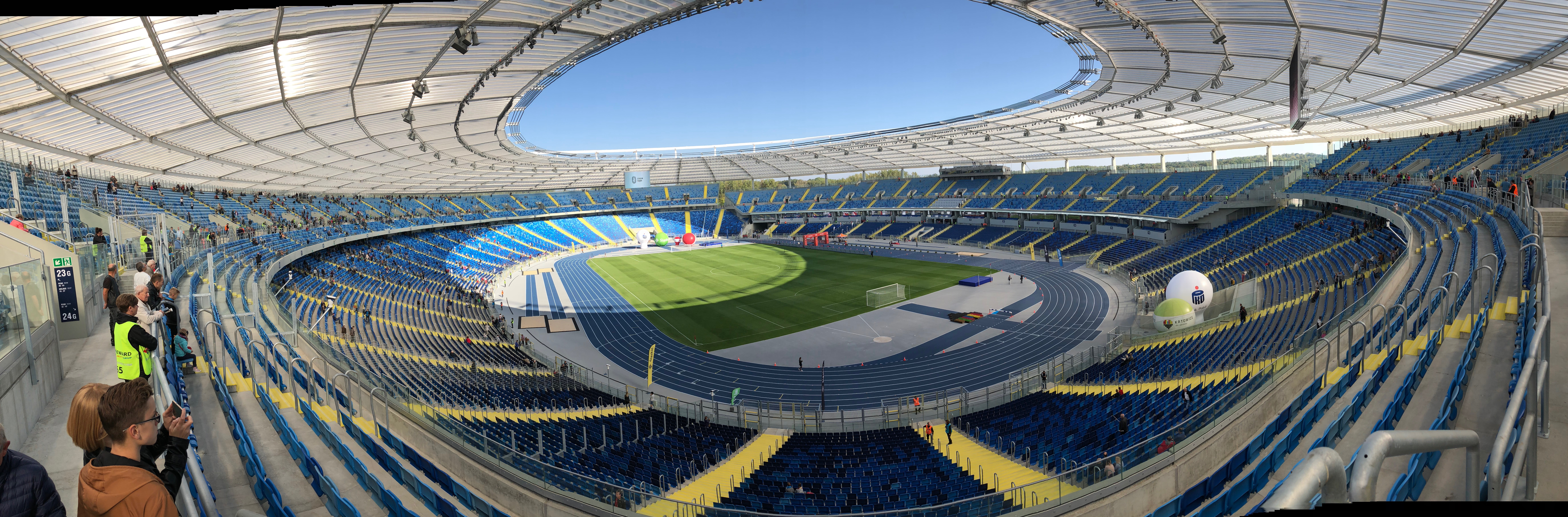
Stadion Śląski in Chorzów, the largest athletics and football stadium in the region

Football, ice hockey and volleyball teams from Upper Silesia enjoyed great success either historically or recently.

Football enjoys a strong following in the region with Górnik Zabrze and Ruch Chorzów among the most accomplished teams in Poland, and other notable teams including GKS Katowice, Odra Opole, Piast Gliwice, Polonia Bytom.

Top volleyball teams, multiple times Polish champions, are Jastrzębski Węgiel and ZAKSA Kędzierzyn-Koźle, with the latter also winning three consecutive CEV Champions League titles in 2021–2023.

Top ice hockey teams, multiple times Polish champions, are GKS Katowice, GKS Tychy, Polonia Bytom.

== Local politics ==
The autonomy movement is relatively young and was only founded in 1990 by Rudolf Kolodziejczyk in Rybnik. It is supposed to continue the traditions of the German period, but also of Silesia under the Second Polish Republic. The current head of the movement is Jerzy Gorzelik. Its main aim is to improve the self-government of the Upper Silesian provinces of Opolskie and Slaskie.

In 2010, RAS (Ruch Autonomii Śląska) had 8.49% of the votes in the Silesian Regional Assembly, i.e. 122,781 votes and three mandates. In 2018 they failed to get any mandates with 3.10%.

== See also ==
- Silesia
- East Upper Silesia
- Opole Silesia
- Lower Silesia
- Middle Silesia
- Silesian Interurbans
- Metropolis GZM
- Katowice urban area
- Katowice-Ostrava metropolitan area
- Upper Silesian Industrial Area
- Upper Silesian Coal Basin
- Wojciech Korfanty
- Water supply in Racibórz

== Sources ==
- H. Förster, B. Kortus (1989) "Social-Geographical Problems of the Cracow and Upper Silesia Agglomerations", Paderborn. (Bochumer Geographische Arbeiten No. 51)
- Bernhard Gröschel (1993) Die Presse Oberschlesiens von den Anfängen bis zum Jahre 1945: Dokumentation und Strukturbeschreibung. Schriften der Stiftung Haus Oberschlesien: Landeskundliche Reihe, Bd. 4 (in German). Berlin: Gebr. Mann, p. 447. ISBN 3-7861-1669-5
- Bernhard Gröschel (1993) Studien und Materialien zur oberschlesischen Tendenzpublizistik des 19. und 20. Jahrhunderts. Schriften der Stiftung Haus Oberschlesien: Landeskundliche Reihe, Bd. 5 (in German). Berlin: Gebr. Mann, p. 219. ISBN 3-7861-1698-9
- Bernhard Gröschel (1993) Themen und Tendenzen in Schlagzeilen der Kattowitzer Zeitung und des Oberschlesischen Kuriers 1925 - 1939: Analyse der Berichterstattung zur Lage der deutschen Minderheit in Ostoberschlesien. Schriften der Stiftung Haus Oberschlesien: Landeskundliche Reihe, Bd. 6 (in German). Berlin: Gebr. Mann, p. 188. ISBN 3-7861-1719-5
- Krzysztof Gwozdz (2000) "The Image of Upper Silesia in geography textbooks 1921-1998", in: Boleslaw Domanski (Ed.), Prace Geograficzne, No. 106, Institute of Geography of the Jagiellonian University Kraków. pp. 55–68
- Rudolf Carl Virchow. "Report on the Typhus Epidemic in Upper Silesia." (1848) Am J Public Health 2006;96 2102–2105. (Excerpted from: Virchow RC. Collected Essays on Public Health and Epidemiology. Vol 1. Rather LJ, ed. Boston, Mass: Science History Publications; 1985:204–319.)
