= Astra 680 =

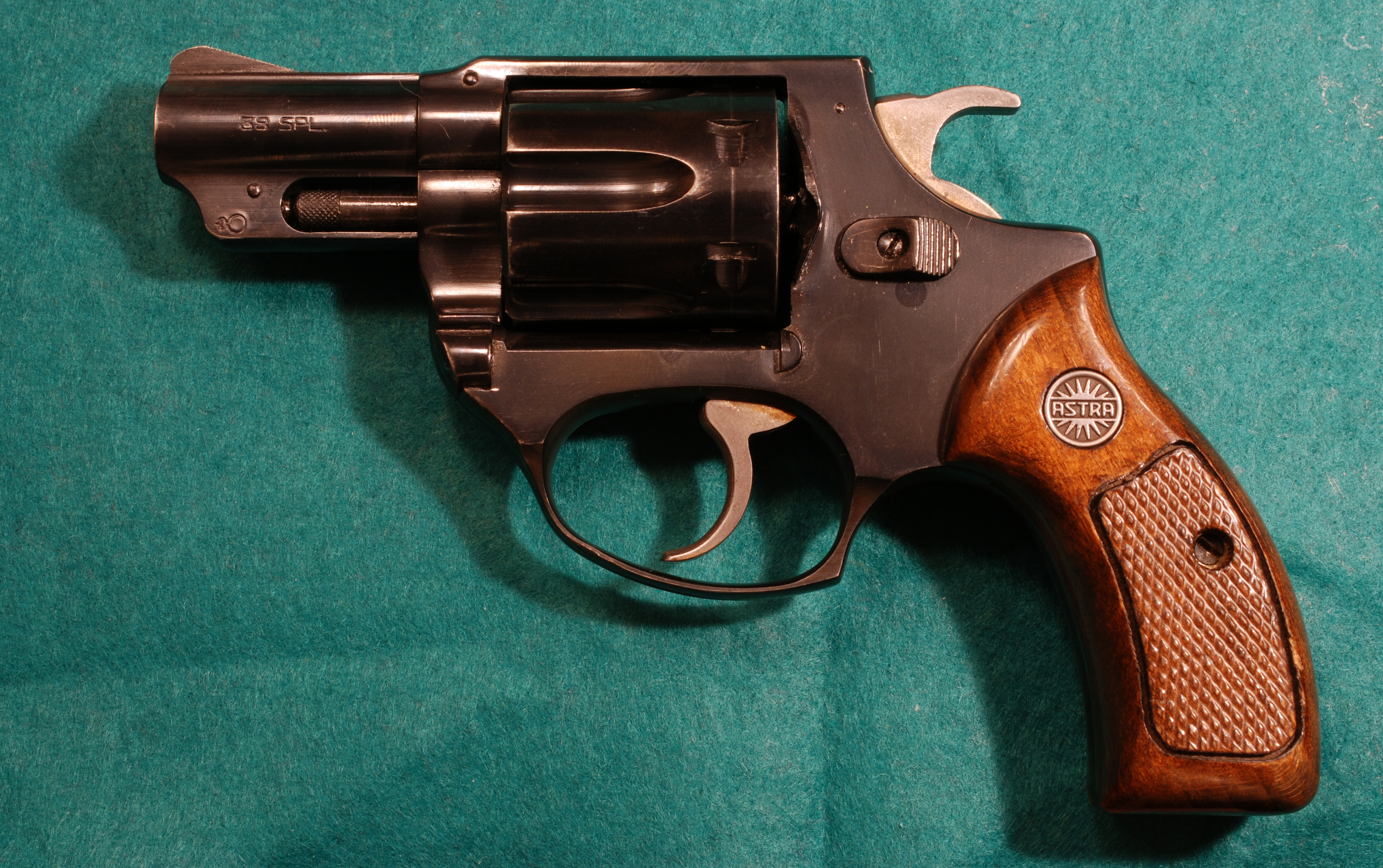
- An Astra 680 revolver on display
- Type: Revolver
- Place of origin: Spain

Production history
- Manufacturer: Astra-Unceta y Cia SA
- Produced: 1981–1996

Specifications
- Mass: 1.4 lbs (0.6 kg)
- Length: 7 in (17.9 cm)
- Barrel length: 2 in (5.1 cm)
- Cartridge: .22 Long Rifle, .22 Winchester Magnum Rimfire, .32 Smith & Wesson Long, or .38 Smith & Wesson Special
- Action: double-action revolver
- Feed system: 8-round cylinder (.22 Long Rifle R/.22 Winchester Rimfire Magnum), or 6-round cylinder (.32 Smith & Wesson Long/.38 Smith & Wesson Special)

The Astra 680 is a short-barreled revolver previously manufactured by Astra of Spain. The 680 was intended primarily for civilian use, but also served as a backup weapon or as a concealed carry weapon by gendarmeries.

The Model 680 was manufactured from 1981 until 1996 by Astra-Unceta y Cia SA with the available chamberings in .22 Long Rifle, .22 Winchester Magnum Rimfire, .32 Smith & Wesson Long, or .38 Smith & Wesson Special.The frame makes included standard stainless steel, polished steel, and blued steel.
