= Kryspin Hermański =

Polish dancer

Kryspin Hermański (born 1982 in Katowice, Poland) is a trained ballet dancer. He is best known for his 2008 appearance as a competitor and the third-place winner on the second season of You Can Dance - the Polish version of the American television show So You Think You Can Dance, which airs on the TVN.

At the age of 10 he attended ballet school in Bytom. "I've just done what every little boy should do: obeyed my mother", he said. While still at school at the age of 13, he made his debut in Śląski Teatr Tańca. After graduating from ballet school, he worked for four years with Zespół Pieśni i Tańca Śląsk. He has been working in Teatr Rozrywki in Chorzów, Poland, since 2006, performing in West Side Story, Jesus Christ Superstar, Fiddler on the Roof, Rent, and Jekyll & Hyde.

In You Can Dance, he was recognized for his versatility in several different styles, including Hip hop dance, Locking, Samba, Contemporary dance.

His fans compared him to Danny Tidwell because of his technical perfection and his attitude toward the camera.
