= Liegnitz (region) =

Districts in Silesia (1905): Regierungsbezirk Liegnitz

Regierungsbezirk Liegnitz was an administrative region in the Prussian Province of Silesia and later Lower Silesia. It existed from 1815 to 1945 and covered the north-western part of Silesia. The administrative region of Liegnitz became known colloquially as Lower Silesia.

== History ==
In 1815, the districts of Bunzlau, Freystadt, Glogau, Goldberg, Grünberg, Liegnitz, Löwenberg, Lüben, Sagan and Sprottau as well as the lands of Prussian Upper Lusatia with the exception of Hoyerswerda were incorporated into the Liegnitz administrative region.

In 1816, the three new districts of Görlitz, Lauban and Rothenburg were established in Upper Lusatia. In 1820, the administrative region was enlarged to include the districts of Bolkenhain, Hirschberg, Jauer, Landeshut and Schönau from the dissolved Reichenbach administrative region and in 1825, the district of Hoyerswerda was transferred from the Province of Brandenburg to the administrative region of Liegnitz. The administrative seat was in the city of Liegnitz. Other important cities in the administrative region were Görlitz, Grünberg, Glogau, Bunzlau, Hoyerswerda (since 1825) and Hirschberg.

Regierungsbezirk Liegnitz bordered Regierungsbezirk Breslau to the east. In the northeast, it bordered the Province of Posen (the Grand Duchy of Posen until 1848; from 1919 the Poznań Voivodeship of Poland), in the northwest the Province of Brandenburg (Regierungsbezirk Frankfurt), in the southwest the Kingdom of Saxony (Free State of Saxony from 1918) and in the south the Austrian crown land of Bohemia (from 1919, Czechoslovakia). With the addition of Hoyerswerda in 1825 it gained a short section of border in the far west with the Province of Saxony (Regierungsbezirk Merseburg; Province of Halle-Merseburg 1944–45). From 1919 to 1938 and from 1941 to 1945, Silesia was divided into two provinces. At this time, the administrative region of Liegnitz belonged to the Province of Lower Silesia.

== Administrative divisions ==
The administrative region comprised the following urban and rural districts:

Stadtkreise (urban districts)

- Glogau, since 1920
- Görlitz, since 1873
- Grünberg in Schlesien (1922–1933)
- Hirschberg im Riesengebirge, since 1922
- Liegnitz, since 1874

Landkreise (rural districts)

- Bolkenhain, part of the Landeshut district since 1932
- Bunzlau
- Fraustadt, until 1938 in Posen-West Prussia
- Freystadt, transferred to the Grünberg district in 1932, recreated in 1933
- Glogau
- Goldberg, known as Goldberg-Haynau until 1932
- Görlitz
- Grünberg
- Hirschberg
- Hoyerswerda
- Jauer, dissolved in 1932, recreated in 1933
- Landeshut
- Lauban
- Liegnitz
- Löwenberg
- Lüben
- Rothenburg
- Sagan, transferred to the Sprottau district in 1932
- Schönau, transferred to the Goldberg district in 1932
- Sprottau
