= Rothenburg (district) =

The district of Rothenburg (Ob. Laus.) was a Prussian district which existed from 1816 to 1947. Today, the territory of the district is split between Germany and Poland by the Lusatian Neisse.

When it was founded, there were two towns in the district, Muskau in the north and Rothenburg (Ob. Laus.) in the south. After the Sagan district was dissolved, its western part, including the town of Priebus was transferred to the Rothenburg district in 1932. Weißwasser and Niesky received town charters in 1935.

After World War II, the part of the Rothenburg district lying east of the Lusatian Neisse became part of the Polish counties of Żary and Zgorzelec. The part of the district lying west of the Lusatian Neisse was incorporated into the state of Saxony on 9 July 1945. In October 1945, the capital of the district was moved to Weißwasser, and it was renamed Weißwasser district. On 16 January 1947 the district of Weißwasser merged with the neighboring district of Görlitz to form the new district of Weißwasser-Görlitz.

== History ==
After the Congress of Vienna in 1815, a large part of Saxon Upper Lusatia became part of Regierungsbezirk Liegnitz in the Prussian Province of Silesia. The new Rothenburg district was formed in May 1816. On 1 January 1820 the villages of Groß Krauscha, Neu Krauscha and Ober Neundorf were transferred from the Rothenburg district to the Görlitz district.

From 1867, the district belonged to the North German Confederation and from 1871 to the German Empire. On 8 November 1919 the province of Silesia was dissolved and the Rothenburg district became part of the new Province of Lower Silesia.

On 1 October 1932 the Sagan district was dissolved and its western part was incorporated into the Rothenburg district. The town of Priebus and the rural communities of Alt Tschöpeln, Bogendorf, Dubrau, Graefenhain, Groß Petersdorf, Hermsdorf b. Priebus, Jamnitz-Pattag, Jenkendorf, Kochsdorf, Mellendorf, Merzdorf b. Priebus, Mühlbach, Neu Tschöpeln, Pechern, Quolsdorf b. Tschöpeln, Raußen, Reichenau b. Priebus, Ruppendorf, Tschöpeln, Wällisch, Wendisch Musta, Zessendorf and Ziebern. With these changes, the Rothenburg district became the second largest district in the province of Lower Silesia after the Sprottau district, which was also recently enlarged.

In the spring of 1945 the district was occupied by the Red Army. In the summer of 1945 the part of the district lying to the east of the Lusatian Neisse was placed under Polish administration in accordance with the Potsdam Agreement. The part of the district lying to the west of the Lusatian Neisse was assigned to the state of Saxony on 9 July 1945. In October, the district administration was moved from the remote town of Rothenburg to the much larger town of Weißwasser, which was accompanied by the renaming of the district, although the old name was still used in isolated cases. On 16 January 1947 the district was merged with the neighboring district of Görlitz to form the new district of Weißwasser-Görlitz with its capital at Weißwasser.

== Demographics ==
The district had a German majority population, with a significant Sorbian minority.

Population of the Rothenburg district
	1843		1846		1852		1861	
Germans	28,624	66.7%	30,125	67.3%	33,366	69.4%	35,258	70.5%
Sorbs	14,267	33.3%	14,628	32.7%	14,700	30.6%	14,752	29.5%
Total	42,891		44,753		48,066		50,010	
