= County of Glatz =

The historical toponym County of Glatz, German: Grafschaft Glatz may correspond to:

- County of Kladsko
- Glatz District (Landkreis Glatz)
- Kłodzko County
