= Lower Silesia Province =

Lower Silesia Province may refer to:

- Lower Silesian Voivodeship, a province in present-day Poland
- Lower Silesia Province (Prussia), a former province of Germany
