= Landkreis Oels =

The District of Oels was a Prussian district in Silesia, which existed from 1742 to 1945. Its capital was the city of Oels. Today, the territory of this district is part of the Polish Lower Silesian Voivodeship.

== History ==
After conquering most of Silesia, King Frederick the Great introduced Prussian administrative structures in Lower Silesia by cabinet order on November 25, 1741. This included the establishment of two war and domain chambers in Breslau and Glogau as well as their subdivision into districts and the appointment of district administrators on January 1, 1742.

In the course of the Stein-Hardenberg reforms in 1815, the district of Oels was assigned to Regierungsbezirk Breslau in the Province of Silesia. During the district reform of January 1, 1818 in Regierungsbezirk Breslau, the city of Medzibor and the villages of Benjaminsthal, Charlottenfeld, Conradau, Erdmannsberg, Friedrikenau, Glashütte, Glashütte bei Tscheschen, Hammer, Honig, Johannisdörfel, Joschune, Kalkowsky, Kenschen, Kenschenhammer, Klenowe, Kottowsky, Kotzine, Mariendorf, Neurode, Ossen, Pawlau, Riefken, Silonke, Suschen, Tscheschen and Wielky reclassified from the Oels district to the Wartenberg district.

According to the Prussian census of 1861, the Oels district had a population of 61,295, of which 61,078 (99.65%) were Germans and 217 (0.35%) were Poles.

On November 8, 1919, the Province of Silesia was dissolved and the new Province of Lower Silesia was formed from Regierungsbezirk Breslau and Regierungsbezirk Liegnitz. On April 1, 1938, the provinces of Lower Silesia and Upper Silesia were merged to form the new Province of Silesia. On January 18, 1941, the Province of Silesia was dissolved again and the Province of Lower Silesia was recreated. In the spring of 1945, the Red Army occupied the district.
