= Prędocice =

Abandoned village in south-western Poland

Prędocice Toporów
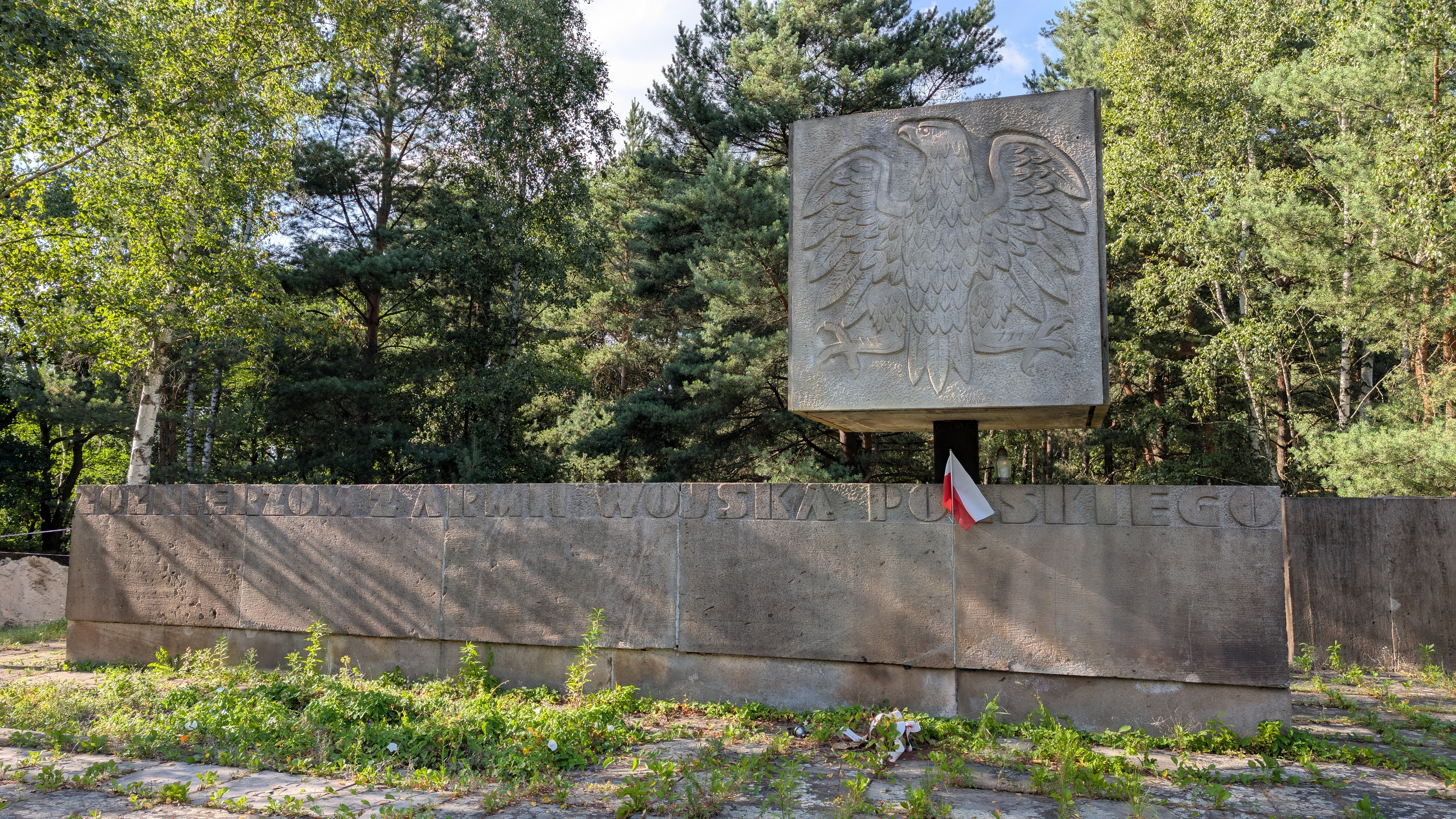
- Memorial for the Second Polish Army and victims of World War II

- Location within Poland
- Coordinates: 51°20′13.8″N 14°59′04.2″E
- Country: Poland
- Voivodeship: Lower Silesian
- County: Zgorzelec
- Gmina: Pieńsk
- Founded: c. 1403
- Population: 0 (Note: Since the end of World War II, the village has been uninhabited.)
- Time zone: UTC+1 (CET)
  - Summer (DST): UTC+2 (CEST)

Prędocice (Toporów, (Note: The name Toporów is still used by locals from nearby towns and villages, and maps, and local signage.) Upper Sorbian: Tormarjecy; German: Tormersdorf) is an abandoned village (Note: The village was never officially a town, however, is sometimes considered a ghost town as opposed to an abandoned village) in the Lower Silesian Forest, located in the administrative district of Gmina Pieńsk, within Zgorzelec County, Lower Silesian Voivodeship, in south-western Poland. It lies on the east bank of the Lusatian Neisse, directly opposite Rothenburg.

== History ==
=== Pre World War II ===
The village dates back to c. 1403, as a Sorbian settlement by the name of Tornow. The name Tormersdorff appeared in written records from 1490. On 6 October, 1518 a fire completely destroyed a manor house. During the fire, a strong easterly wind blew, and spread the fire west into Rothenburg. In 1840, a faience factory opened, on the site of the manor house. The factory was closed in 1860.

=== World War II ===
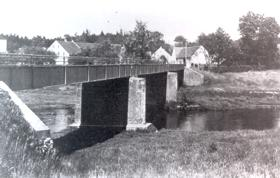
Bridge on the Lusatian Neisse before it was blown up in 1945

In 1941, a Jewish ghetto was established by Nazi Germany which at one time housed over 700 Jews, mainly from Görlitz and Wrocław. They were forced to work here as laborers in local companies. On 20 February 1945, the Wehrmacht blew up the Tormersdorf bridge over the Lusatian Neisse to Rothenburg. On 16 April 1945, the Lusatian Operation began. The village was given the codename Toporów, with a command post of the Second Polish Army being located here. The Second Polish Army crossed the Lusatian Neisse, and captured Rothenburg. By the end of the war, the village was almost completely destroyed, and now remains abandoned.

=== Post World War II ===
There is a memorial which commemorates the Second Polish Army and the victims of World War II. From 5 September 1949, Polish Border Protection Forces were stationed here until shortly before 1983. Since the end of World War II, the village has been uninhabited.

== Demographics (pre World War II) ==
Year	Population
1840	431
1910	563
1919	474
1933	676
1939	696

== Gallery ==
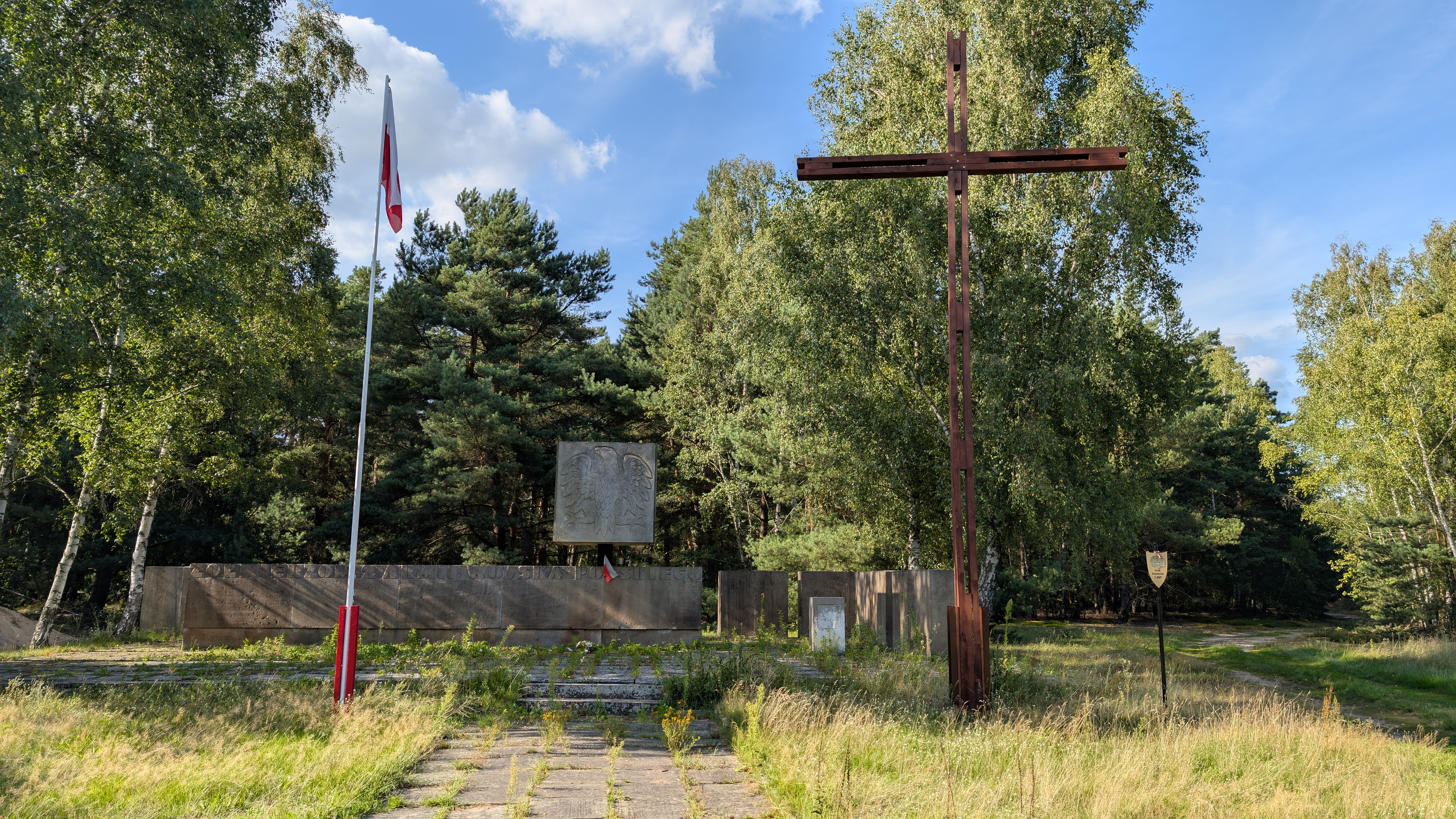
Main memorial of the Second Polish Army

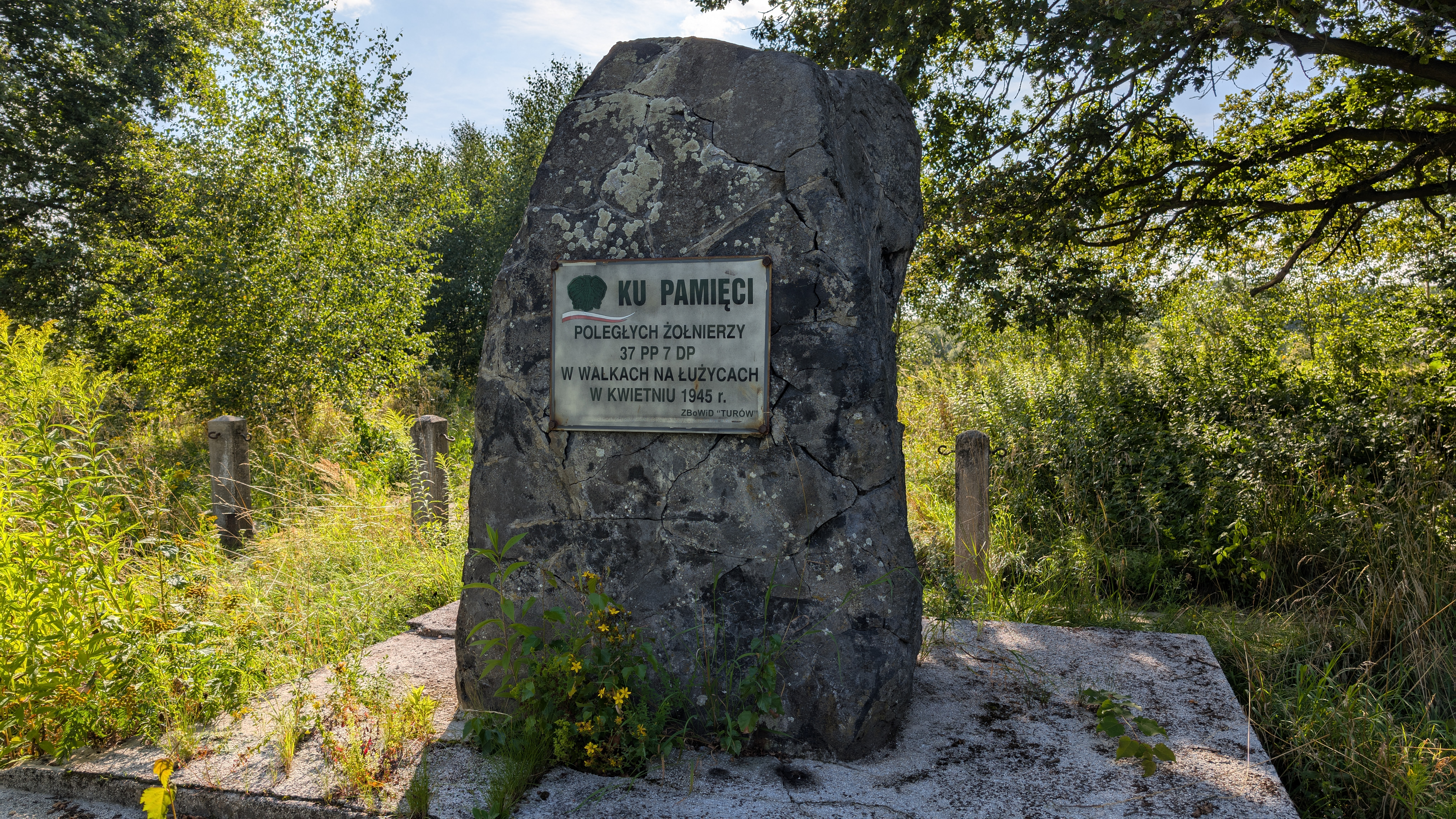
Memorial to fallen soldiers of the Polish 37th Infantry Regiment

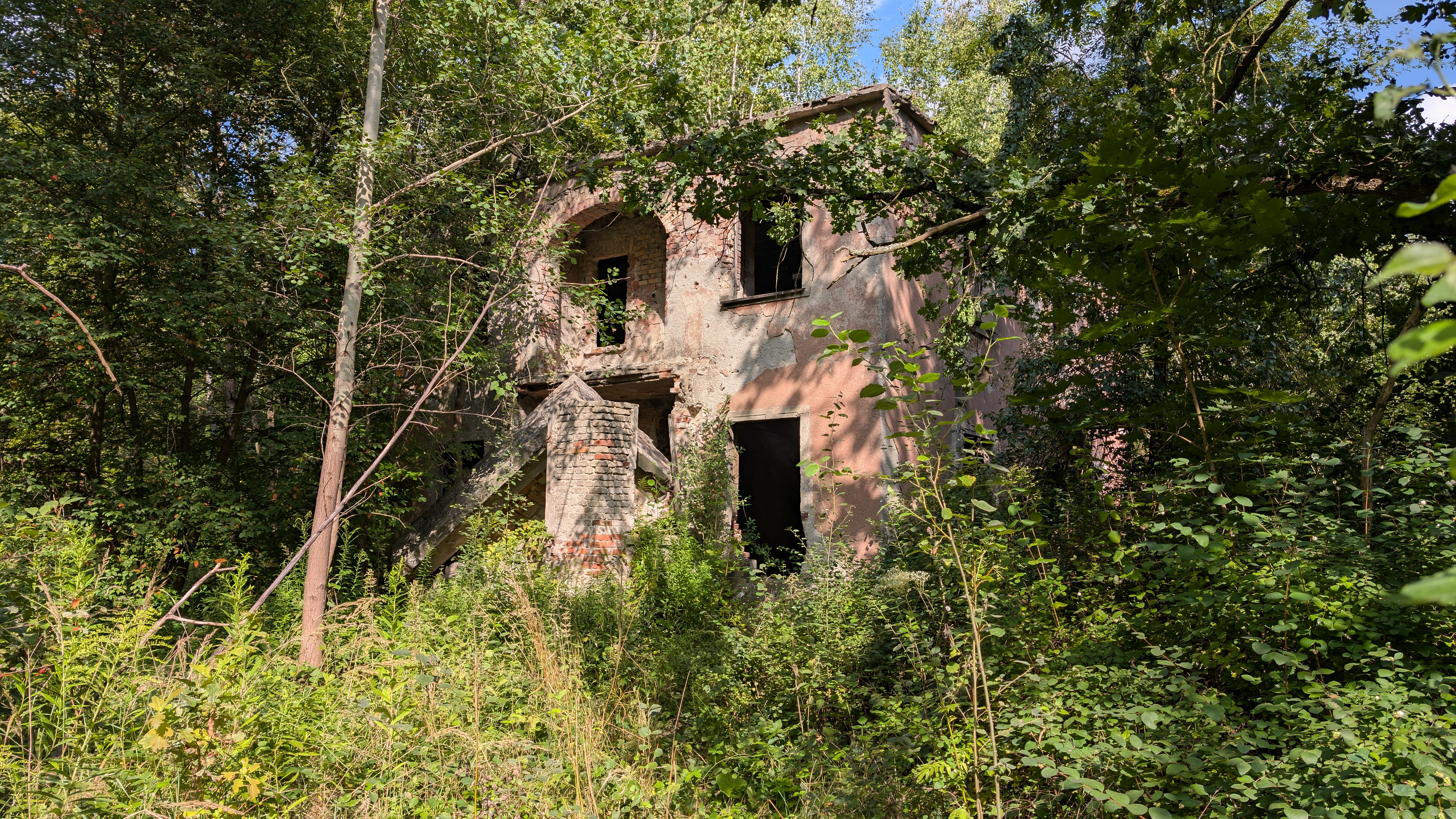
Abandoned building once used by the Polish Border Protection Forces

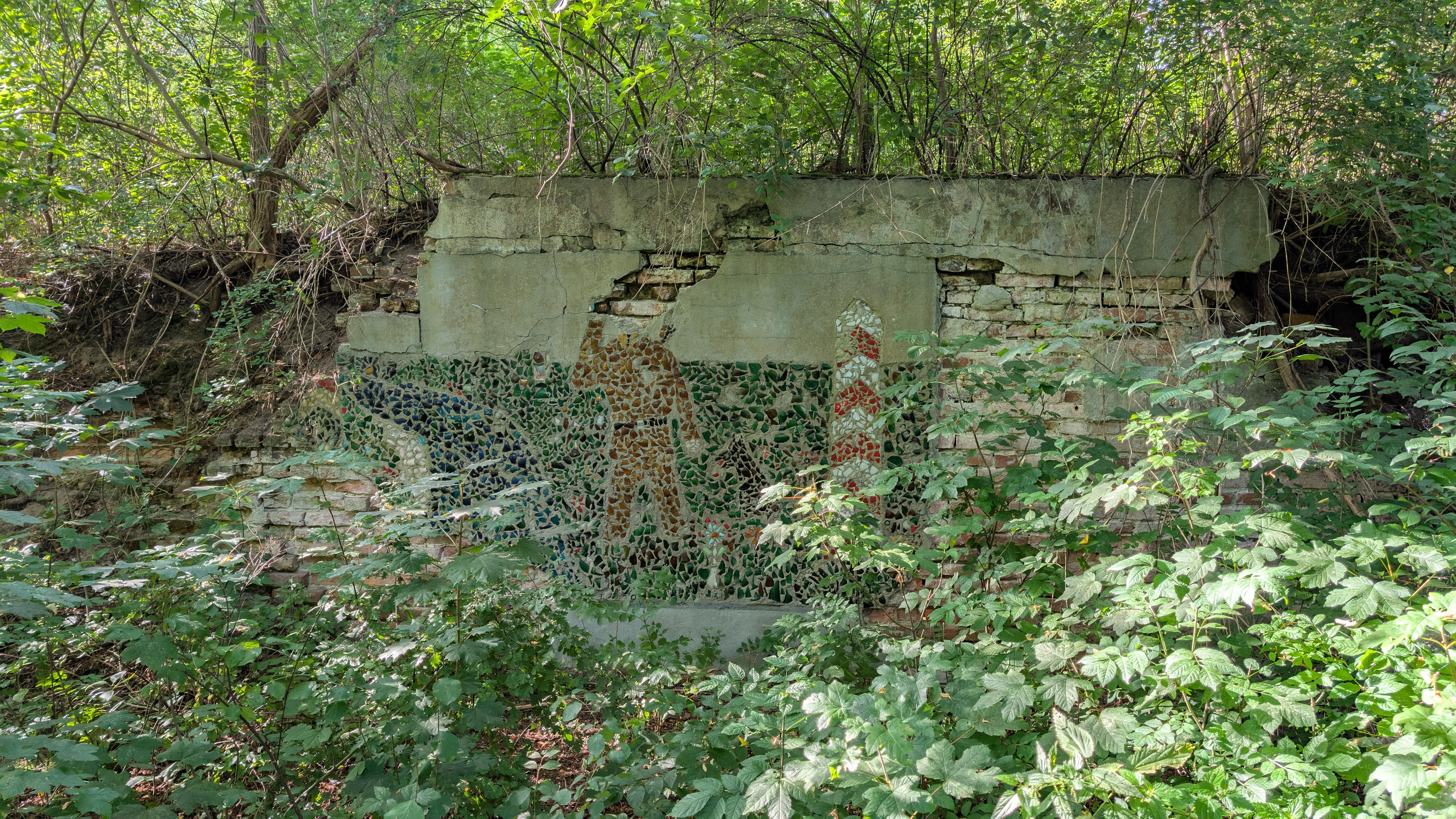
Mosaic pattern of a Polish border unit

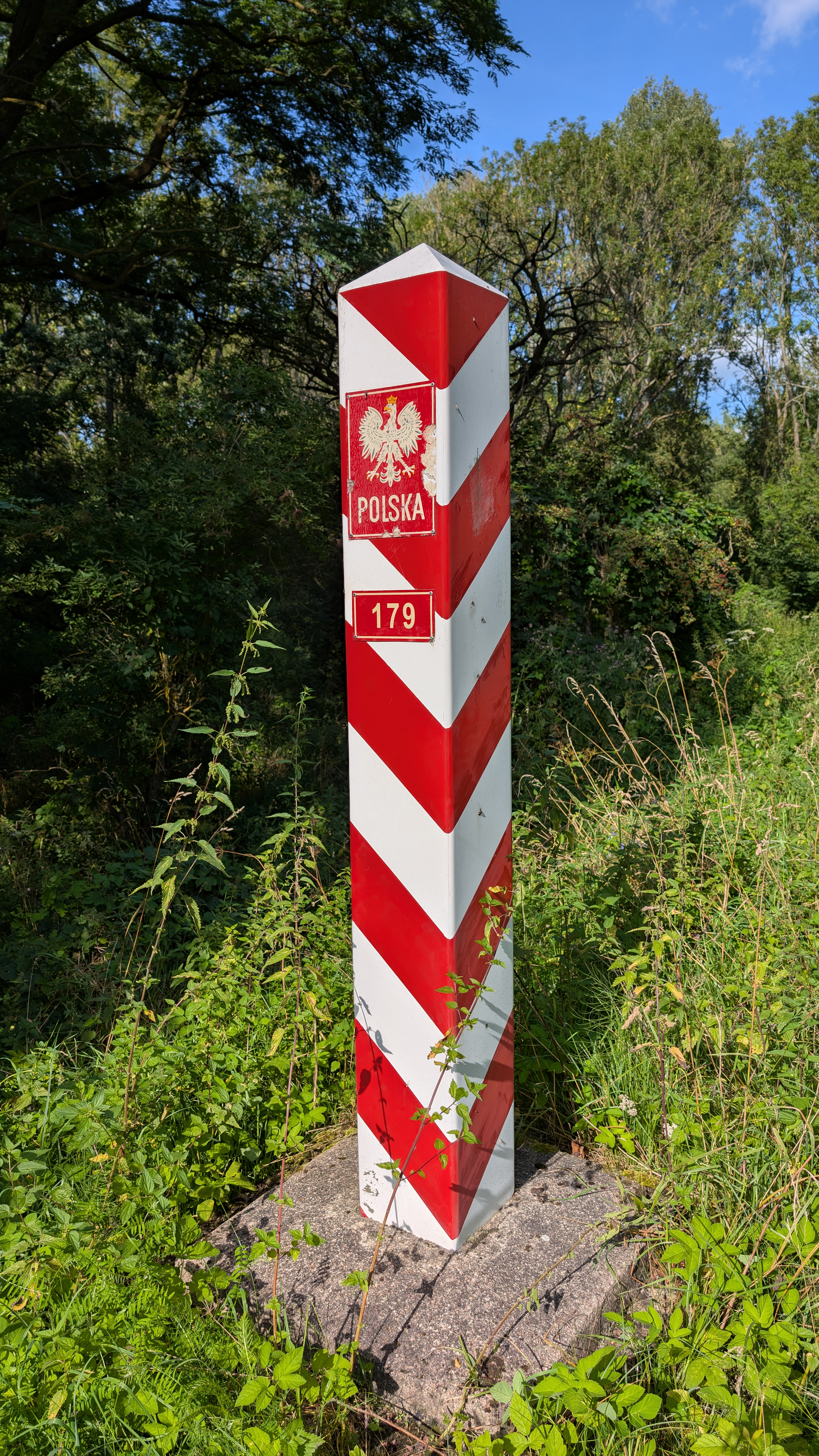
Polish border boundary marker no. 179. This marker is located where the bridge once stood

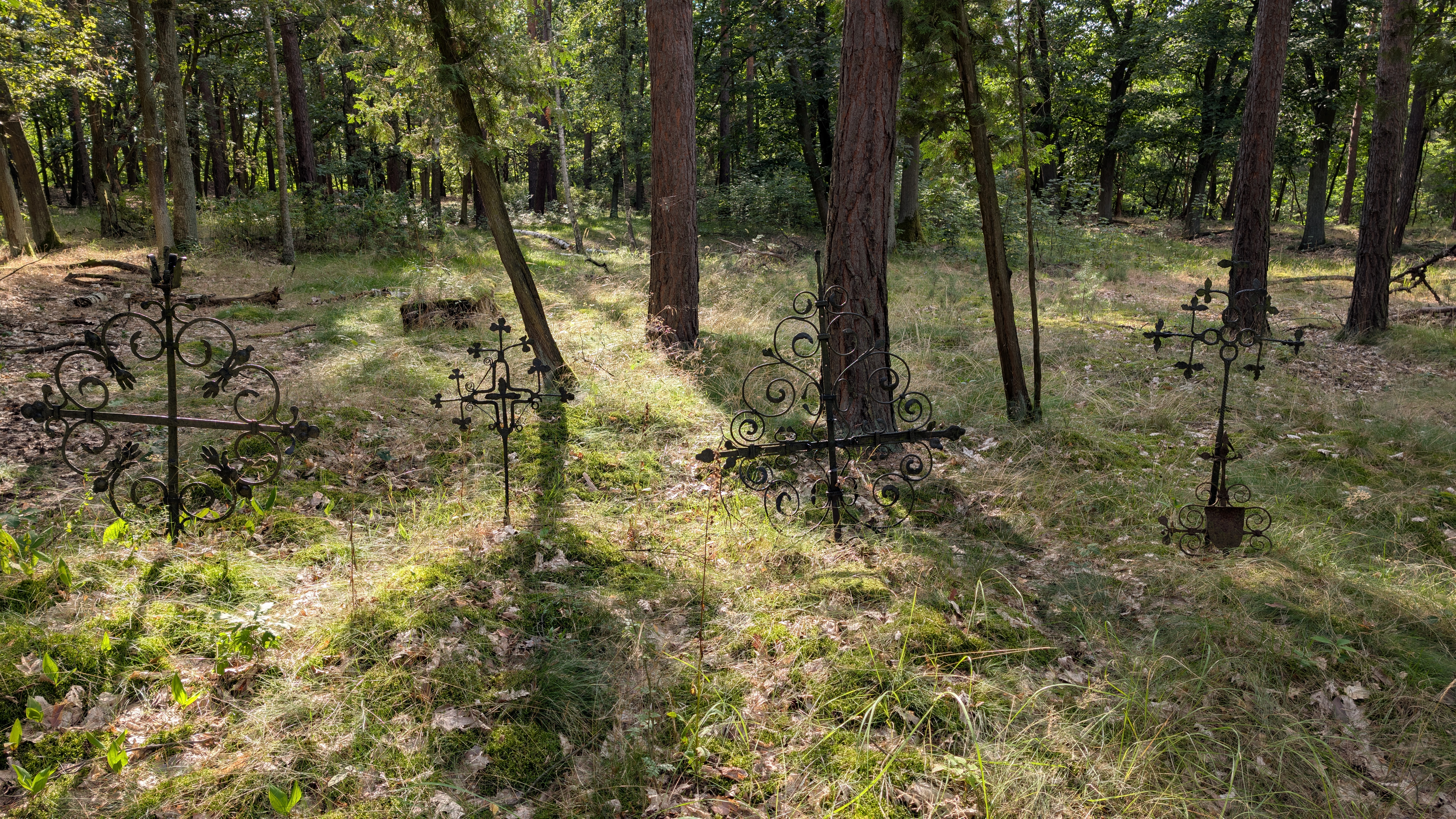
Abandoned German cemetery

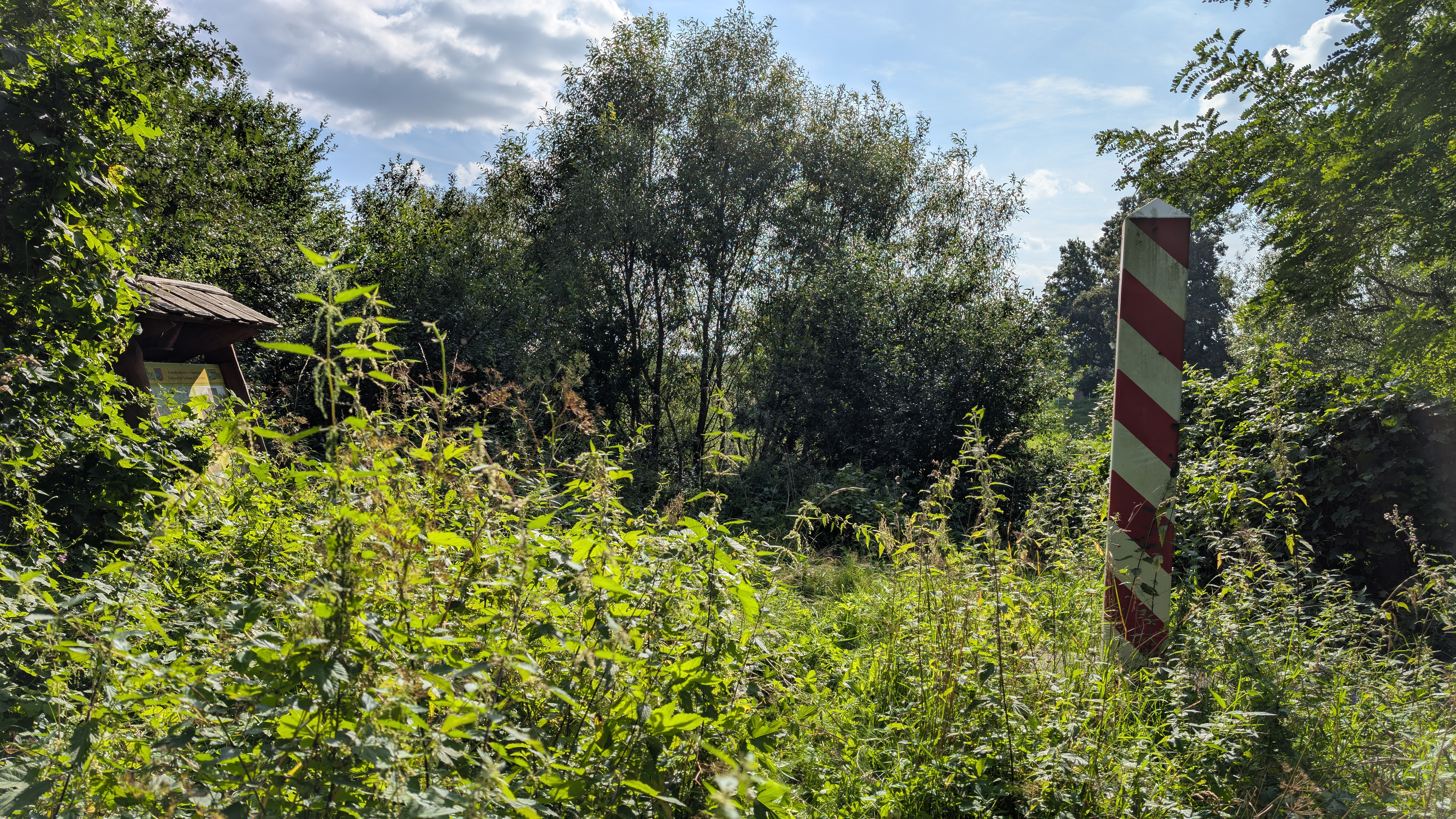
Location where the bridge once stood

== See also ==
- Second Polish Army
- Jewish ghettos established by Nazi Germany
- Rothenburg, Oberlausitz
