= Landkreis Namslau =

Former administrative division

- District of Prussia
- 1742–1945
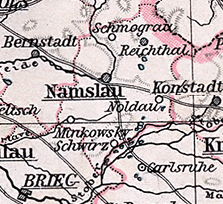
- Map from 1905
- Capital: Namslau (Namysłów)
- History
  - Established: 1742
  - Disestablished: 1945
- Today part of: Poland

Landkreis Namslau was a district in Prussian Silesia, from 1742 to 1945. The district capital was at Namslau (Namysłów). Today, the territory of the district is located in the Polish Opole Voivodeship.

== History ==
After conquering most of Silesia, King Frederick the Great introduced Prussian administrative structures in Lower Silesia by cabinet order on 25 November 1741. This included the establishment of two war and domain chambers in Breslau (Wrocław) and Glogau (Głogów) as well as their subdivision into districts and the appointment of district administrators on 1 January 1742.

The district became part of the Province of Silesia in 1815, as part of Regierungsbezirk Breslau. The indigenous Polish population was subjected to Germanisation policies. On 8 November 1919 the Free State of Prussia dissolved the Province of Silesia and the Namslau district became part of the new Province of Lower Silesia, which was formed from Regierungsbezirk Breslau and Regierungsbezirk Liegnitz. With the entry into force of the Treaty of Versailles on 10 January 1920, parts of the district including the town of Reichthal (Rychtal) and the surrounding rural communities became again part of Poland. The persecution of Poles intensified in 1939. In January 1945, the Red Army captured the area of the Namslau district and in April, it became again part of Poland.

== Demographics ==
The district had a mixed population of Germans and Poles.

Population of Landkreis Namslau
	1837		1861	
Germans	7,579	26.4%	16,619	47.6%
Poles	21,156	73.6%	18,316	52.4%
Total	28,735		34,935	
