= Province of Silesia =

Province of Prussia (1815–1919; 1938–1941)

Province of Silesia Provinz Schlesien (German)
- Province of Prussia
- 1815–1919; 1938–1941
- Flag Coat of arms

- Silesia Province (red) within the Kingdom of Prussia (blue), within the German Empire, 1871
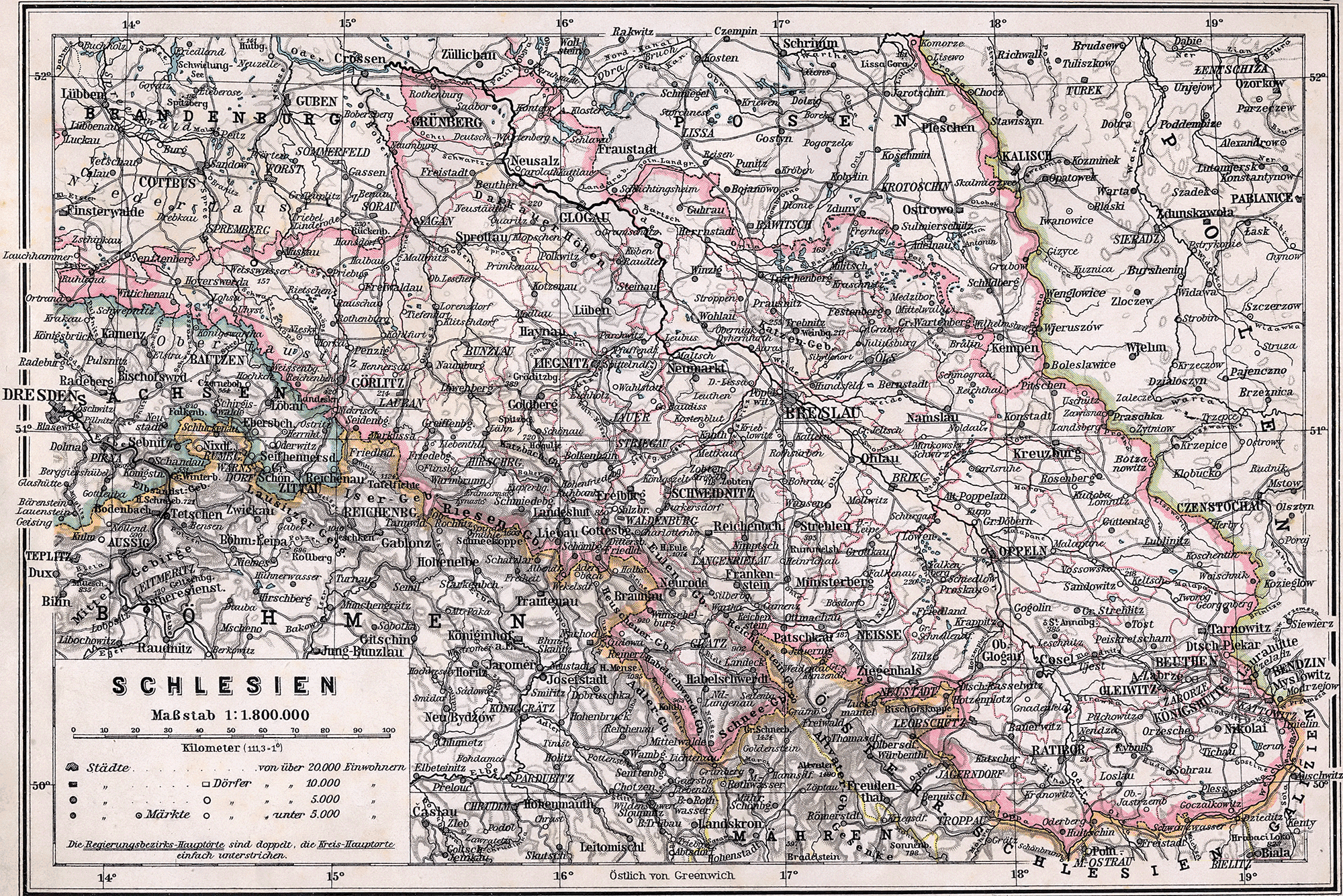
- Capital: Breslau
- Area
  - Coordinates: 51°7′N 17°2′E
- History
  - Established: 1815
  - Disestablished: 1919
  - Briefly re-established: 1938–1941
- Political subdivisions: Breslau; Liegnitz; Oppeln
Preceded by	Succeeded by
Prussian Silesia; Upper Lusatia	Province of Lower Silesia; Province of Upper Silesia
- Today part of: Germany; Poland; Czech Republic

The Province of Silesia (German: Provinz Schlesien; Polish: Prowincja Śląska; Silesian: Prowincyjŏ Ślōnskŏ) was a province of Prussia from 1815 to 1919. The Silesia region was part of the Prussian realm since 1742 and established as an official province in 1815, then became part of the German Empire in 1871. In 1919, as part of the Free State of Prussia within Weimar Germany, Silesia was divided into the provinces of Upper Silesia and Lower Silesia. Silesia was reunified briefly from 1 April 1938 to 27 January 1941 as a province of Nazi Germany before being divided back into Upper Silesia and Lower Silesia.

Breslau (present-day Wrocław, Poland) was the provincial capital.

== Geography ==
Physical map of Silesia in 1905

The Province of Silesia encompassed lands surrounding the Oder River, with the Sudetes mountain range forming its southwest border. The province had a humid continental climate, which progressed to a subalpine climate at higher elevations of the Sudetes. It was divided into 3 Regierungsbezirke; Liegnitz and Breslau (corresponding to Lower Silesia), and Regierungsbezirk Oppeln (corresponding to Upper Silesia).

In the west, the province reached the Schwarze Elster river and included a portion of Lusatia around the large town of Görlitz. The Lusatian Neisse river crossed this part of the province from south to north. Other major rivers of this region included the Quies and Bober. These rivers had their source in the Giant Mountains (German: Riesengebirge), which formed part of the border between Silesia and Bohemia; here stood Schneekoppe (Czech: Śnieżka, Polish: Sněžka), which at 1,603 meters above sea level was the highest peak of the province. The foothills of the Giant Mountains saw economic development first through the mining of iron and other ores, and later through tourism. The towns of Hirschberg (Polish: Jelenia Góra) and Landeshut (Polish: Kamienna Góra) were located at the feet of the Giant Mountains.

Further north, western Silesia was generally flat and heavily wooded. The town of Grünberg (Polish: Zielona Góra) was a regional agricultural and textile-manufacturing center, with a historical focus on wine-growing. The town of Bunzlau (Polish: Bolesławiec) had a strong tradition in pottery, while Glogau (Polish: Głogów) served as a transportation hub. The Bartsch River joined with the Oder just upstream from Glogau. The Katzbach river flowed from the foothills of the Sudetes through the regional capital of Liegnitz (Polish: Legnica) before joining the Oder.

In the central portion of the province, its capital of Breslau (Polish: Wrocław) was found on the Oder river. Tributaries such as the Weistritz, Ohle, and Weide rivers all joined the Oder in the vicinity of Breslau. Also included in the Breslau region was the town of Glatz (Polish: Kłodzko) which was found in the eponymous Glatz Valley, a basin around 300 meters above sea level surrounded by hills and mountains. The Eastern Neisse river flowed through the valley to the northeast, eventually joining the Oder upstream from the town of Brieg (Polish: Brzeg).

In the southeast, the province included the majority of historical Upper Silesia. The regional capital of Oppeln (Polish: Opole) was located on the Oder near the border with Middle Silesia. Important tributaries of the Oder found here included the Malapane and Klodnitz, the latter of which connected the Oder valley to the industrial heartland of Upper Silesia around the towns Gleiwitz (Polish: Gliwice), Beuthen (Polish: Bytom), and Kattowitz (Polish: Katowice), among others. The Upper Silesian Coal Basin facilitated the development of mining and metallurgical industries which led to immense population growth in the 19th and 20th centuries. Further south, the river Oder entered Prussian Silesia about 20 kilometers upstream from the town of Ratibor (Polish: Racibórz). In the far southeast, the province reached to the left bank of the upper Vistula River.

=== Political Geography ===
The Prussian Province of Silesia comprised the bulk of the former Bohemian crown land of Upper and Lower Silesia as well as the adjacent County of Kladsko, all of which the Prussian King Frederick the Great had conquered from the Austrian Habsburg monarchy under Empress Maria Theresa in the 18th century Silesian Wars. It also included the northeastern part of Upper Lusatia around Görlitz and Lauban (Lubań), ceded to Prussia by the Kingdom of Saxony according to the resolutions of the Congress of Vienna in 1815.

The province bordered on the Prussian heartland of Brandenburg (including the newly acquired lands of Lower Lusatia) in the northwest, and on the Grand Duchy of Posen (Province of Posen from 1848) in the north, i.e. the Greater Polish lands that before the 18th century Partitions of Poland had belonged to the Polish–Lithuanian Commonwealth.

In the northeast, Upper Silesia bordered on Congress Poland, i.e. the Kingdom of Poland which had been reconstituted from the Duchy of Warsaw and was made up of former parts of the Prussian and Austrian partitions. Congress Poland was in a personal union with the Russian Empire until 1867 when it was formally integrated as the Vistula Land.

In the east lay the Austrian share, the Lesser Polish Kingdom of Galicia and Lodomeria with the Free City of Kraków until 1846, and in the south the remaining Bohemian crown lands of Austrian Silesia, Moravia and Bohemia proper. The incorporated Upper Lusatian strip of land in the west touched the remaining territory of the Saxon kingdom and in the furthest west the Prussian Province of Saxony.

== History ==
Crown land of Silesia until 1742 (shaded in cyan) and Silesia Province from 1825 (outlined in red), superimposed on modern international borders

=== Prussian Silesia, 1742–1815 ===
The coronation of Maria Theresa as queen regnant of the Kingdom of Bohemia immediately triggered an invasion of the region of Silesia by King Frederick the Great of Prussia, thereby starting the War of the Austrian Succession (1740–1748). By the end of the First Silesian War in 1742, the Prussian forces had conquered almost all of the Habsburg crown land in Silesia. The conquest marked the beginning of the era of Prussian Silesia.

According to the peace treaties of Breslau and Berlin, only some smaller parts in the extreme southeast, like the Duchy of Cieszyn as well as the southern parts of the duchies of Troppau and Nysa, remained possessions of the Habsburg monarchy as Austrian Silesia. Attempts by Maria Theresa to regain the crown land in the Second Silesian War (1744–1745) failed and she ultimately had to relinquish her claims over Silesia by the Treaty of Dresden.

The Third Silesian War (1756–1763), a theatre of the Seven Years' War, once again confirmed Prussian control over most of Silesia, and due to its predominantly Protestant population especially in Lower Silesia, it became one of the most loyal territories of the House of Hohenzollern. When the Prussian territories were reorganized upon the Congress of Vienna, the province of Silesia was created out of the territories acquired by Prussia in the Silesian Wars, as well as those Upper Lusatian territories which King Frederick Augustus I of Saxony had to relinquish due to his indecisive attitude in the Napoleonic Wars. As the lands had been part of the Holy Roman Empire until 1806, Silesia was among the western Prussian provinces that lay within the borders of the German Confederation.

=== Province of Silesia ===
==== Kingdom of Prussia and German Empire ====
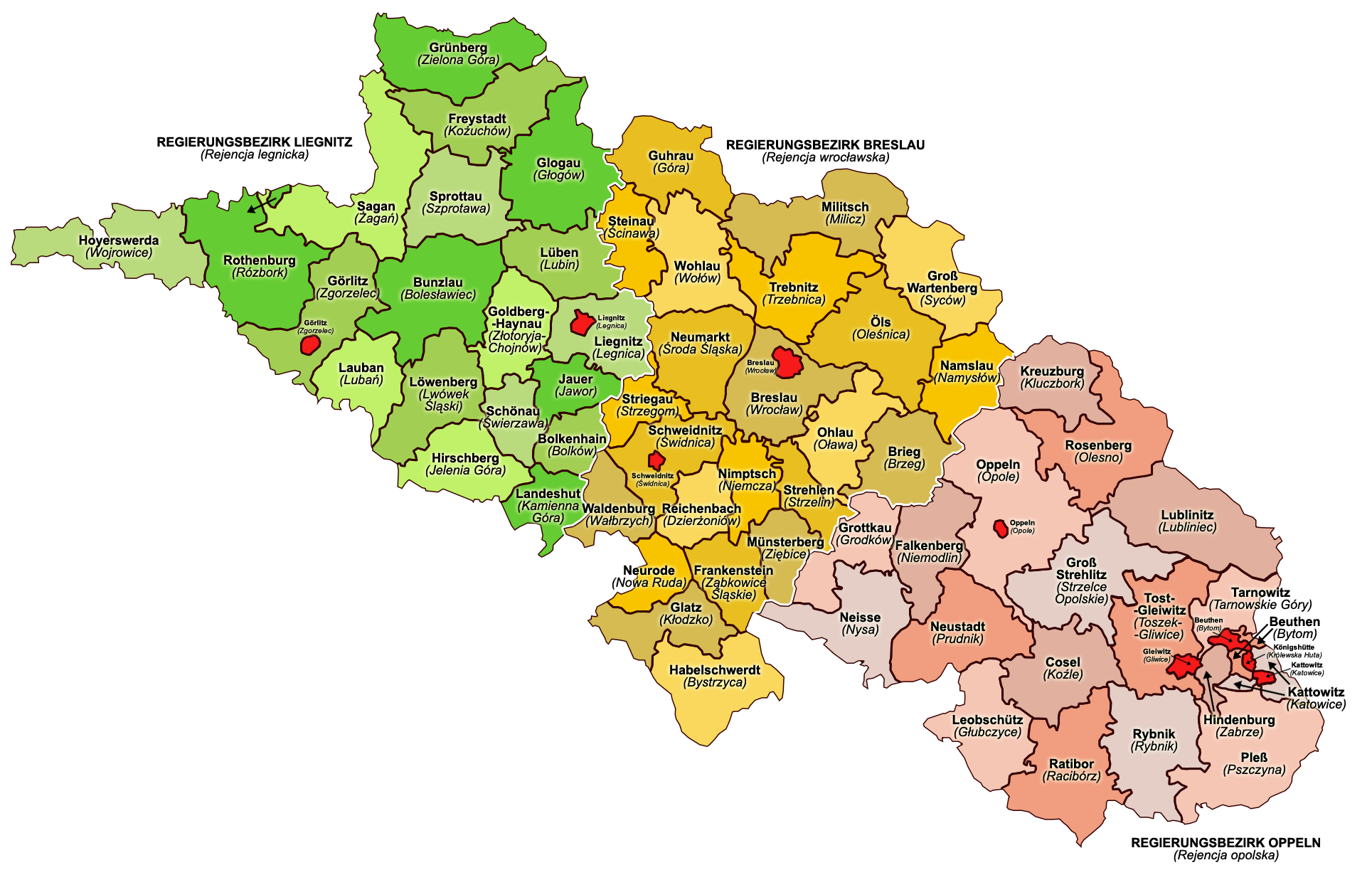
Administrative map of the province of Silesia, 1905

In 1815, after the Napoleonic wars, Prussian Silesia was formally reorganized into the province of Silesia. The character of the province's eastern third, Upper Silesia, had been much lesser shaped by the medieval German Ostsiedlung. According to the census of 1905, about three-quarters of the Silesian inhabitants were German–speaking, while a majority of the population to the east of the Oder river spoke Polish, including Silesian and Lach dialects. The indigenous Polish and Sorbian population was subjected to Germanisation policies. Sorbian-language Lutheran preparations for Confirmation were prohibited with the ban lifted only after World War I.

Because of the extended iron ore and black coal deposits of the Upper Silesian Coal Basin, there was considerable industrialization and urbanization in Upper Silesia and many people from neighbouring Posen and Congress Poland immigrated at that time. In 1871, Silesia became part of the German Empire as a province of Prussia following the unification of Germany. The Upper Silesian Industrial Region was the second largest industrial agglomeration of the German Empire after the Ruhr area.

Over decades the mainly Catholic Upper Silesian citizens in majority voted for the German Centre Party, while the Lower Silesian constituencies were dominated by the Free-minded Party and the Social Democrats. Ethnic tensions rose on the eve of World War I, with politicians like Wojciech Korfanty separating from the Centre Party and giving utterance to distinct Polish interests.

==== Weimar Republic ====
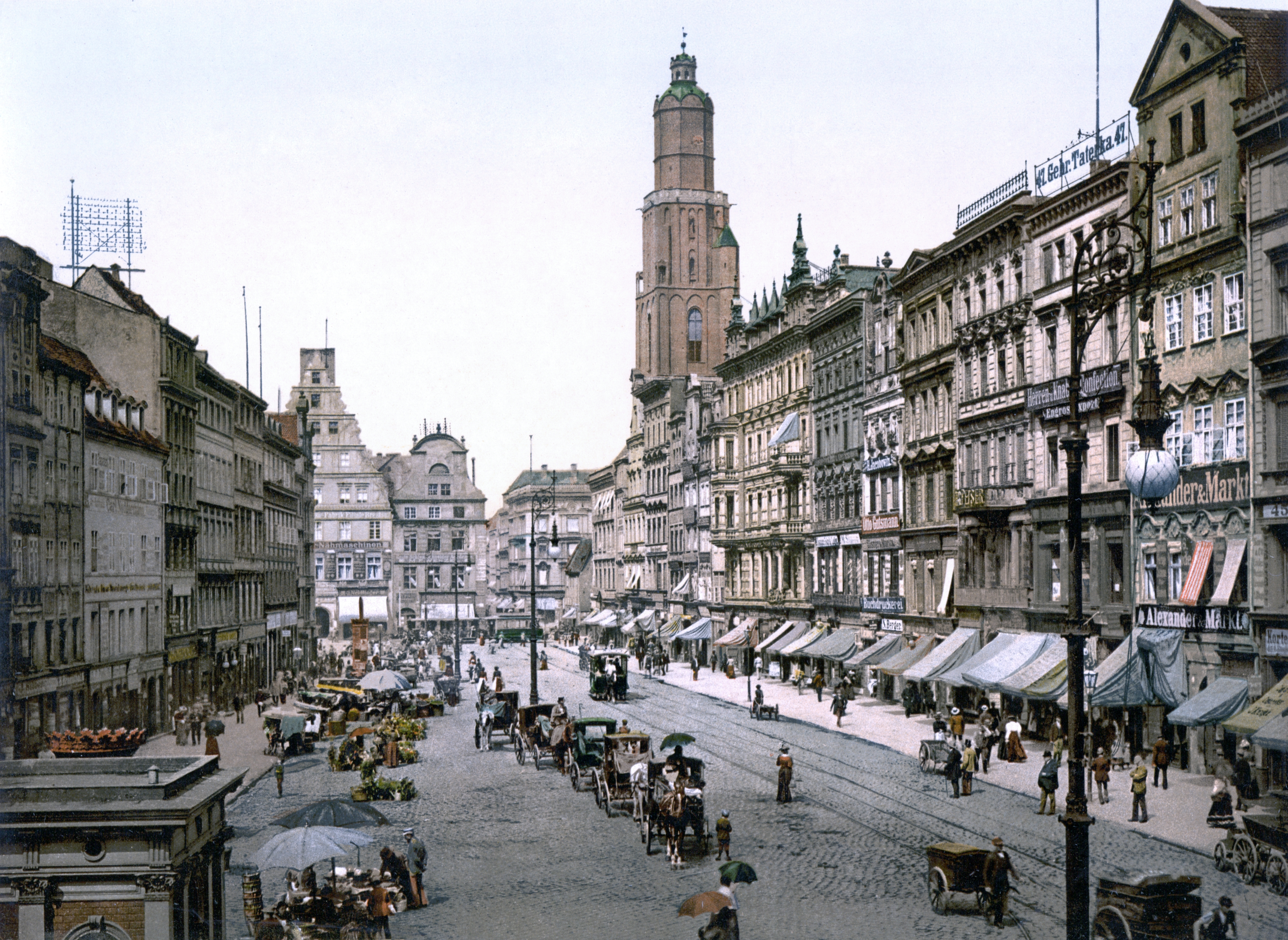
Market Square in Breslau (Wrocław), 1890–1900

In 1919, a year after the war ended, the parts of Silesia remaining in Weimar Germany were re-organized into the two provinces of Lower Silesia (Niederschlesien) and Upper Silesia (Oberschlesien, the former Regierungsbezirk Oppeln). After three Silesian Uprisings and the 1921 Upper Silesia plebiscite, the East Upper Silesian part of the province around the industrial city of Katowice was transferred to the Second Polish Republic and incorporated into the Silesian Voivodeship in 1922. In 1920 the Hlučín Region was ceded to Czechoslovakia according to the Treaty of Versailles.

===== Division after WWI =====
Division of Prussian Silesia between Weimar Germany, Poland and Czechoslovakia after World War I
Division of:	Area in 1910 in km^{2}	Share of territory	Population in 1910	After WW1 part of:	Notes
Lower Silesia	27,105 km^{2}	100%	3.017.981	Divided between:	
to Poland	527 km^{2}	2%	1%	Poznań Voivodeship (Niederschlesiens Ostmark)	(Note: After World War I Poland received a small part of historical Lower Silesia, with majority ethnic Polish population as of year 1918. That area included parts of counties Syców (German: Polnisch Wartenberg), Namysłów, Góra and Milicz. In total around 526 square kilometers with around 30 thousand inhabitants, including the city of Rychtal. Too small to form its own voivodeship, the area was incorporated to Poznań Voivodeship (former Province of Posen).)
to Germany	26,578 km^{2}	98%	99%	Province of Lower Silesia	
Upper Silesia	13,230 km^{2}	100%	2.207.981	Divided between:	
to Poland	3,225 km^{2}	25%	41%	Silesian Voivodeship	(Note: Interwar Silesian Voivodeship was formed from Prussian East Upper Silesia (area 3,225 km^{2}) and Polish part of Austrian Cieszyn Silesia (1,010 km^{2}), in total 4,235 km^{2}. After the annexation of Trans-Olza from Czechoslovakia in 1938, it increased to 5,122 km^{2}. Silesian Voivodeship's capital was Katowice.)
to Czechoslovakia	325 km^{2}	2%	2%	Hlučín Region	
to Germany	9,680 km^{2}	73%	57%	Province of Upper Silesia	

==== Nazi Germany ====
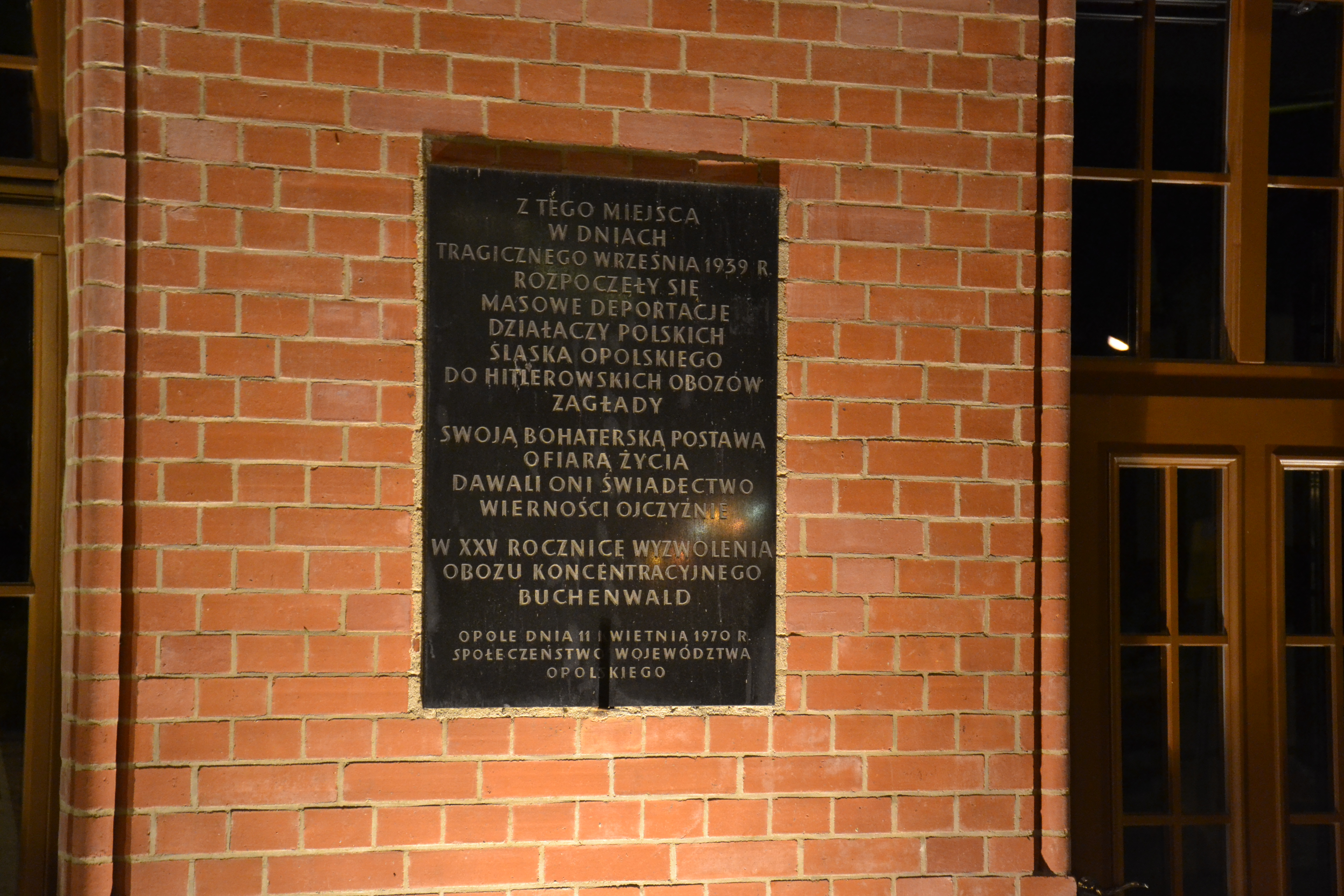
Plaque in Opole commemorating deportations of Poles to concentration camps in 1939

On 1 April 1938 the province of Silesia was re-established by Nazi Germany by uniting the existing Upper Silesia and Lower Silesia provinces. Nazi German persecution of Poles in the province intensified in 1938–1939 with expulsions of Polish activists, distributors of Polish press, priests, craftsmen, farmers, students etc., attacks on Polish cultural centers, banks, enterprises, schools, churches and houses, seizure of Polish libraries, confiscations of Polish press, arrests and deportations of Polish activists to concentration camps and even assassinations.

In 1938, Nazi authorities forced the Lutheran Church not to staff bilingual German-Sorbian parishes with new Sorbian preachers, and the Bund Deutscher Osten demanded a ban on Sorbian church masses, but only a limit of two such masses per month was imposed. There were instances of expulsions of Sorbian pastors.

During the German invasion of Poland, which started World War II in September 1939, Gestapo carried out mass arrests of Polish activists, teachers, journalists, entrepreneurs, library directors and chairmen of local branches of the "Sokół" Polish Gymnastic Society, shut down Polish newspapers and seized the funds of Polish banks from the pre-war German Province of Silesia. The arrested Poles were deported to concentration camps. Polish church services were abolished, with the last Polish service held in the Saint Martin church in Wrocław on 17 September 1939. Soon the border was extended eastwards when parts of Polish Silesia were annexed into the province. In the annexed pre-war Polish part the occupiers conducted the genocidal Intelligenzaktion campaign and expulsions of Poles.

The Germans also established the Gross-Rosen concentration camp and multiple prisoner-of-war camps with numerous forced labour subcamps in the region, including Stalag VIII-A, Stalag VIII-B, Stalag VIII-C, Stalag VIII-E, Oflag VIII-A, Oflag VIII-B, Oflag VIII-C, Oflag VIII-F, for Polish POWs and civilians, and French, Belgian, Dutch and later also other Allied POWs.

On 27 January 1941, during World War II, the province of Silesia was divided again by reverting into Upper Silesia and Lower Silesia.

== Demographics ==
Mother Tongues of Silesia, according to the 1905 Census

Religious Confessions of Silesia, according to the 1905 Census

Language situation in the province of Silesia by county, 1905

In the Prussian census of 1890, the province of Silesia had a population of 4,224,458, of which 3,105,843 (73.52%) spoke German, 973,596 (23.05%) spoke Polish, 68,781 (1.63%) spoke Czech, 26,257 (0.62%) spoke Sorbian and 48,045 (1.14%) identified as bilingual.

Regierungsbezirk Liegnitz – 1,047,405 (96.41% German, 2.51% Sorbian, 0.53% Polish, 0.11% Czech, 0.38% bilingual).

Regierungsbezirk Breslau – 1,599,322 (95.63% German, 3.08% Polish, 0.59% Czech, 0.64% bilingual).

Regierungsbezirk Oppeln – 1,577,731 (58.23% Polish, 35.91% German, 3.69% Czech, 2.14% bilingual).

In 1905, the linguistic makeup of Lower Silesia was overwhelmingly German-speaking, with Sorbian-speaking majorities in parts of Lusatia, and Czech-speaking majorities found in pockets near Bad Kudowa, in Hussinetz, and in Friedrichs-Tabor. In Upper Silesia, Polish-speakers tended to be dominant in the countryside, while German-speaking majorities were found in most cities. Czech-speakers constituted the majority in the Hultschin region, and communities of Moravian exiles could also be found in the towns of Petersgrätz and Friedrichsgrätz.

The following tables contain data collected by the Prussian statistical office from the census of 1905:

Region	German	Polish	Moravian	Wendish	Another Language	German & another language	Total
Regierungsbezirk Breslau	1,701,734 (95.9%)	50,391 (2.8%)	765 (0.0%)	36 (0.0%)	12,151 (0.7%)	8,802 (0.5%)	1,773,879
Regierungsbezirk Liegnitz	1,089,266 (96.1%)	12,174 (1.1%)	467 (0.0%)	24,488 (2.2%)	3,254 (0.3%)	3,496 (0.3%)	1,133,145
Regierungsbezirk Oppeln	757,200 (37.2%)	1,158,826 (56.9%)	59,205 (2.9%)	42 (0.0%)	5,148 (0.3%)	55,230 (2.7%)	2,035,651
Prov. Schlesien	3,548,200 (71.8%)	1,221,391 (24.7%)	60,437 (1.2%)	24,566 (0.5%)	20,553 (0.4%)	67,528 (1.4%)	4,942,675

Regierungsbezirk Breslau
Kreis	German	Polish	Moravian	Wendish	Another Language	German & another language	Total
Breslau (Stadtkreis)	460,366 (97.8%)	6,286 (1.3%)	149 (0.0%)	2 (0.0%)	1,235 (0.3%)	2,866 (0.6%)	470,904
Brieg (Stadtkreis)	25,504 (92.8%)	1,733 (6.3%)	33 (0.1%)	9 (0.0%)	41 (0.1%)	166 (0.6%)	27,486
Schweidnitz (Stadtkreis)	29,424 (96.3%)	941 (3.1%)	32 (0.1%)	2 (0.0%)	74 (0.2%)	67 (0.2%)	30,540
Breslau (Landkreis)	88,282 (97.0%)	2,252 (2.5%)	17 (0.0%)	7 (0.0%)	153 (0.2%)	256 (0.3%)	90,967
Brieg (Landkreis)	35,908 (95.1%)	1,129 (3.0%)	4 (0.0%)	(0.0%)	9 (0.0%)	711 (1.9%)	37,761
Frankenstein	45,304 (99.3%)	169 (0.4%)	32 (0.1%)	(0.0%)	119 (0.3%)	1 (0.0%)	45,625
Glatz	59,267 (93.5%)	651 (1.0%)	7 (0.0%)	(0.0%)	3,258 (5.1%)	223 (0.4%)	63,406
Groß Wartenberg	25,449 (54.2%)	18,025 (38.4%)	9 (0.0%)	(0.0%)	1,348 (2.9%)	2,133 (4.5%)	46,964
Guhrau	31,476 (96.0%)	1,253 (3.8%)	4 (0.0%)	(0.0%)	23 (0.1%)	45 (0.1%)	32,801
Habelschwerdt	56,560 (98.3%)	132 (0.2%)	109 (0.2%)	2 (0.0%)	666 (1.2%)	50 (0.1%)	57,519
Militsch	46,647 (97.4%)	1,128 (2.4%)	2 (0.0%)	1 (0.0%)	24 (0.1%)	85 (0.2%)	47,887
Münsterberg	31,814 (98.4%)	444 (1.4%)	11 (0.0%)	(0.0%)	48 (0.1%)	29 (0.1%)	32,346
Namslau	24,554 (72.5%)	8,068 (23.8%)	14 (0.0%)	(0.0%)	31 (0.1%)	1,203 (3.6%)	33,870
Neumarkt	54,841 (97.9%)	1,046 (1.9%)	9 (0.0%)	(0.0%)	33 (0.1%)	62 (0.1%)	55,991
Neurode	48,850 (98.4%)	118 (0.2%)	45 (0.1%)	1 (0.0%)	615 (1.2%)	26 (0.1%)	49,655
Nimptsch	28,307 (97.1%)	743 (2.5%)	1 (0.0%)	(0.0%)	71 (0.2%)	30 (0.1%)	29,152
Oels	62,760 (97.9%)	1,020 (1.6%)	8 (0.0%)	1 (0.0%)	63 (0.1%)	255 (0.4%)	64,107
Ohlau	54,311 (99.0%)	445 (0.8%)	7 (0.0%)	(0.0%)	27 (0.0%)	87 (0.2%)	54,877
Reichenbach	70,773 (98.9%)	366 (0.5%)	30 (0.0%)	(0.0%)	299 (0.4%)	68 (0.1%)	71,536
Schweidnitz (Landkreis)	71,102 (98.6%)	808 (1.1%)	12 (0.0%)	(0.0%)	83 (0.1%)	139 (0.2%)	72,144
Steinau	22,685 (97.9%)	449 (1.9%)	1 (0.0%)	(0.0%)	22 (0.1%)	12 (0.1%)	23,169
Strehlen	32,232 (91.1%)	285 (0.8%)	4 (0.0%)	(0.0%)	2,861 (8.1%)	2 (0.0%)	35,384
Striegau	43,187 (98.7%)	459 (1.0%)	19 (0.0%)	3 (0.0%)	72 (0.2%)	28 (0.1%)	43,768
Trebnitz	50,423 (97.7%)	1,051 (2.0%)	7 (0.0%)	(0.0%)	57 (0.1%)	48 (0.1%)	51,586
Waldenburg	160,001 (99.0%)	338 (0.2%)	193 (0.1%)	8 (0.0%)	885 (0.5%)	178 (0.1%)	161,603
Wohlau	41,707 (97.4%)	1,052 (2.5%)	6 (0.0%)	(0.0%)	34 (0.1%)	32 (0.1%)	42,831
Total (Reg. Breslau)	1,701,734 (95.9%)	50,391 (2.8%)	765 (0.0%)	36 (0.0%)	12,151 (0.7%)	8,802 (0.5%)	1,773,879

Regierungsbezirk Liegnitz
Kreis	German	Polish	Moravian	Wendish	Another Language	German & another language	Total
Görlitz (Stadtkreis)	82,674 (98.7%)	558 (0.7%)	20 (0.0%)	35 (0.0%)	313 (0.4%)	166 (0.2%)	83,766
Liegnitz (Stadtkreis)	59,237 (99.1%)	321 (0.5%)	8 (0.0%)	(0.0%)	115 (0.2%)	68 (0.1%)	59,749
Bolkenhain	28,992 (99.1%)	137 (0.5%)	63 (0.2%)	(0.0%)	52 (0.2%)	11 (0.0%)	29,255
Bunzlau	62,685 (98.6%)	680 (1.1%)	33 (0.1%)	7 (0.0%)	111 (0.2%)	88 (0.1%)	63,604
Freystadt	53,305 (98.3%)	699 (1.3%)	5 (0.0%)	(0.0%)	106 (0.2%)	137 (0.3%)	54,252
Glogau	71,243 (96.7%)	1,995 (2.7%)	5 (0.0%)	4 (0.0%)	87 (0.1%)	341 (0.5%)	73,675
Goldberg-Haynau	49,803 (98.0%)	875 (1.7%)	17 (0.0%)	3 (0.0%)	53 (0.1%)	74 (0.1%)	50,825
Görlitz (Landkreis)	57,554 (99.0%)	271 (0.5%)	18 (0.0%)	81 (0.1%)	140 (0.2%)	78 (0.1%)	58,142
Grünberg	55,740 (98.9%)	463 (0.8%)	13 (0.0%)	2 (0.0%)	59 (0.1%)	74 (0.1%)	56,351
Hirschberg	81,648 (98.8%)	327 (0.4%)	38 (0.0%)	6 (0.0%)	531 (0.6%)	124 (0.1%)	82,674
Hoyerswerda	23,982 (61.2%)	178 (0.5%)	32 (0.1%)	14,425 (36.8%)	86 (0.2%)	457 (1.2%)	39,160
Jauer	34,711 (96.9%)	1,069 (3.0%)	5 (0.0%)	(0.0%)	44 (0.1%)	(0.0%)	35,829
Landeshut	51,303 (98.6%)	101 (0.2%)	36 (0.1%)	26 (0.0%)	516 (1.0%)	28 (0.1%)	52,010
Lauban	71,147 (99.2%)	345 (0.5%)	18 (0.0%)	5 (0.0%)	132 (0.2%)	68 (0.1%)	71,715
Liegnitz (Landkreis)	40,586 (97.5%)	899 (2.2%)	37 (0.1%)	2 (0.0%)	58 (0.1%)	46 (0.1%)	41,628
Löwenberg	60,532 (98.9%)	306 (0.5%)	12 (0.0%)	8 (0.0%)	323 (0.5%)	42 (0.1%)	61,223
Lüben	31,231 (98.0%)	569 (1.8%)	10 (0.0%)	(0.0%)	27 (0.1%)	21 (0.1%)	31,858
Rothenburg	52,995 (81.3%)	390 (0.6%)	64 (0.1%)	9,875 (15.1%)	256 (0.4%)	1,624 (2.5%)	65,204
Sagan	56,595 (98.5%)	720 (1.3%)	31 (0.1%)	9 (0.0%)	71 (0.1%)	3 (0.0%)	57,429
Schönau	24,672 (97.8%)	474 (1.9%)	(0.0%)	(0.0%)	81 (0.3%)	4 (0.0%)	25,231
Sprottau	38,631 (97.6%)	797 (2.0%)	2 (0.0%)	(0.0%)	93 (0.2%)	42 (0.1%)	39,565
Total (Reg. Liegnitz)	1,089,266 (96.1%)	12,174 (1.1%)	467 (0.0%)	24,488 (2.2%)	3,254 (0.3%)	3,496 (0.3%)	1,133,145

Regierungsbezirk Oppeln
Kreis	German	Polish	Moravian	Wendish	Another Language	German & another language	Total
Beuthen (Stadtkreis)	35,513 (58.9%)	22,644 (37.6%)	66 (0.1%)	(0.0%)	234 (0.4%)	1,816 (3.0%)	60,273
Gleiwitz (Stadtkreis)	42,966 (70.1%)	13,274 (21.6%)	12 (0.0%)	(0.0%)	42 (0.1%)	5,032 (8.2%)	61,326
Kattowitz (Stadtkreis)	26,817 (75.0%)	6,690 (18.7%)	53 (0.1%)	20 (0.1%)	85 (0.2%)	2,107 (5.9%)	35,772
Königshütte (Stadtkreis)	33,352 (50.5%)	27,374 (41.4%)	74 (0.1%)	(0.0%)	200 (0.3%)	5,042 (7.6%)	66,042
Oppeln (Stadtkreis)	24,051 (78.2%)	6,200 (20.2%)	8 (0.0%)	1 (0.0%)	31 (0.1%)	474 (1.5%)	30,765
Ratibor (Stadtkreis)	21,204 (64.9%)	9,893 (30.3%)	438 (1.3%)	(0.0%)	67 (0.2%)	1,088 (3.3%)	32,690
Beuthen (Landkreis)	39,662 (23.6%)	122,965 (73.1%)	253 (0.2%)	(0.0%)	359 (0.2%)	4,867 (2.9%)	168,106
Kosel	14,804 (20.1%)	56,698 (76.8%)	55 (0.1%)	1 (0.0%)	19 (0.0%)	2,208 (3.0%)	73,785
Falkenberg	33,771 (88.7%)	4,065 (10.7%)	8 (0.0%)	(0.0%)	32 (0.1%)	192 (0.5%)	38,068
Groß Strehlitz	11,762 (16.1%)	59,812 (82.1%)	4 (0.0%)	(0.0%)	870 (1.2%)	432 (0.6%)	72,880
Grottkau	40,107 (98.6%)	516 (1.3%)	9 (0.0%)	(0.0%)	27 (0.1%)	4 (0.0%)	40,663
Zabrze	38,118 (27.3%)	97,703 (70.0%)	108 (0.1%)	(0.0%)	147 (0.1%)	3,421 (2.5%)	139,497
Kattowitz (Landkreis)	45,994 (25.0%)	130,926 (71.2%)	190 (0.1%)	14 (0.0%)	546 (0.3%)	6,277 (3.4%)	183,947
Kreuzburg	20,641 (41.4%)	28,318 (56.7%)	7 (0.0%)	(0.0%)	16 (0.0%)	928 (1.9%)	49,910
Leobschütz	70,548 (84.3%)	4,476 (5.3%)	7,341 (8.8%)	2 (0.0%)	119 (0.1%)	1,236 (1.5%)	83,722
Lublinitz	7,235 (15.0%)	30,373 (62.8%)	4 (0.0%)	(0.0%)	5 (0.0%)	10,715 (22.2%)	48,332
Neiße	98,886 (97.9%)	1,749 (1.7%)	62 (0.1%)	1 (0.0%)	77 (0.1%)	248 (0.2%)	101,023
Neustadt	51,797 (52.3%)	45,957 (46.4%)	31 (0.0%)	(0.0%)	37 (0.0%)	1,134 (1.1%)	98,956
Oppeln (Landkreis)	18,996 (17.2%)	88,102 (79.8%)	14 (0.0%)	3 (0.0%)	1,839 (1.7%)	1,410 (1.3%)	110,364
Pleß	13,902 (12.2%)	98,178 (86.2%)	37 (0.0%)	(0.0%)	53 (0.0%)	1,678 (1.5%)	113,848
Ratibor (Landkreis)	11,676 (9.7%)	56,944 (47.5%)	50,203 (41.9%)	(0.0%)	35 (0.0%)	966 (0.8%)	119,824
Rosenberg	7,180 (14.2%)	42,509 (84.3%)	17 (0.0%)	(0.0%)	4 (0.0%)	707 (1.4%)	50,417
Rybnik	17,938 (16.4%)	90,253 (82.5%)	159 (0.1%)	(0.0%)	227 (0.2%)	872 (0.8%)	109,449
Tarnowitz	16,468 (23.8%)	51,753 (74.7%)	29 (0.0%)	(0.0%)	52 (0.1%)	994 (1.4%)	69,296
Tost-Glewitz	13,812 (18.0%)	61,454 (80.1%)	23 (0.0%)	(0.0%)	25 (0.0%)	1,382 (1.8%)	76,696
Total (Reg. Oppeln)	757,200 (37.2%)	1,158,826 (56.9%)	59,205 (2.9%)	42 (0.0%)	5,148 (0.3%)	55,230 (2.7%)	2,035,651

== Administration ==
Regierungsbezirk Breslau

- Urban districts (Stadtkreise)
1. Breslau
2. Brieg (from 1907)
3. Schweidnitz
- Rural districts (Landkreise)
1. Breslau
2. Brieg
3. Frankenstein
4. Glatz (former County of Kladsko)
5. Groß Wartenberg
6. Guhrau
7. Habelschwerdt (former County of Kladsko)
8. Militsch
9. Münsterberg
10. Namslau
11. Neumarkt
12. Neurode (former County of Kladsko)
13. Nimptsch
14. Oels
15. Ohlau
16. Reichenbach
17. Schweidnitz
18. Steinau
19. Strehlen
20. Striegau
21. Trebnitz
22. Waldenburg
23. Wohlau

Regierungsbezirk Liegnitz

- Urban districts (Stadtkreise)
1. Görlitz
2. Liegnitz
- Rural districts (Landkreise)
1. Bolkenhain
2. Bunzlau
3. Freystadt
4. Glogau
5. Goldberg
6. Görlitz (former Saxon Upper Lusatia)
7. Grünberg
8. Hirschberg
9. Hoyerswerda (former Saxon Upper Lusatia)
10. Jauer
11. Landeshut
12. Lauban (former Saxon Upper Lusatia)
13. Liegnitz
14. Löwenberg
15. Lüben
16. Rothenburg (former Saxon Upper Lusatia)
17. Sagan
18. Schönau
19. Sprottau

Regierungsbezirk Oppeln

- Urban districts (Stadtkreise)
1. Beuthen
2. Gleiwitz
3. Kattowitz
4. Königshütte
5. Oppeln
6. Ratibor (from 1904)
- Rural districts (Landkreise)
1. Beuthen
2. Cosel
3. Falkenberg
4. Groß Strehlitz
5. Grottkau
6. Zabrze (from 1915: Hindenburg)
7. Kattowitz
8. Kreuzburg
9. Leobschütz
10. Lublinitz
11. Neiße
12. Neustadt
13. Oppeln
14. Pleß
15. Ratibor
16. Rosenberg
17. Rybnik
18. Tarnowitz
19. Tost–Gleiwitz
