= District of Lower Silesia =

Former district of Poland

Lower Silesian District
- District of the Republic of Poland
- 1945–1946
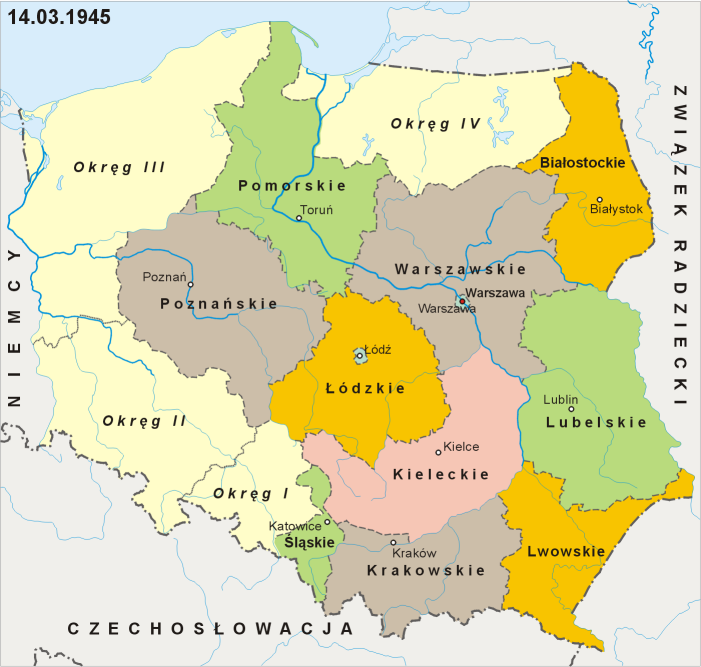
- The administrative subdivisions of Poland in 1945, including the District of Lower Silesia
- Government
- Attorney-in-fact
  - 1945–1946: Stanisław Piaskowski
- History
  - Established: 14 March 1945
  - Disestablished: 24 June 1946
- Contained within
  - Country: Provisional Government of the Republic of Poland (1945); Provisional Government of National Unity (1945–1946)
Preceded by	Succeeded by
Province of Lower Silesia; Province of Brandenburg	Wrocław Voivodeship; Poznań Voivodeship

The Lower Silesian District, (Note: Polish: Okręg Dolny Śląsk) also designated as the 2nd District, (Note: Polish: Okręg II) was a district that acted as a provisional administrative division of Poland, during the administration of the Provisional Government of the Republic of Poland in 1945, and the Provisional Government of National Unity from 1945 to 1946. It was centered around the area of the Lower Silesia. It was established as one of four provisional districts on 14 March 1945. On 25 September 1945, the territories near its northern border were incorporated into the Poznań Voivodeship. It existed until 28 June 1946, when it was abolished and replaced with the Wrocław Voivodeship. The head of the district was the attorney-in-fact Stanisław Piaskowski.

== Gallery ==
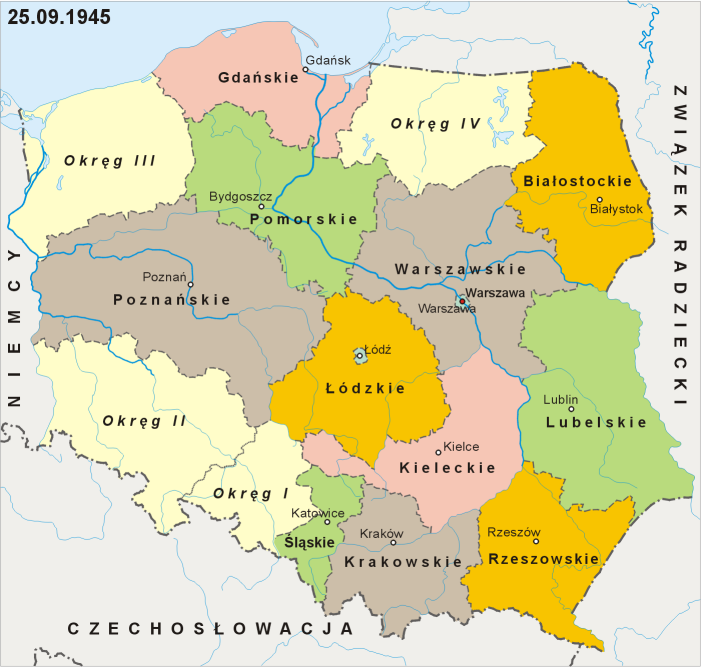
The administrative subdivisions of Poland from 25 September to 24 June 1945, including the District of Lower Silesia.
