= Rothenburg, Oberlausitz =

Rothenburg
- Town
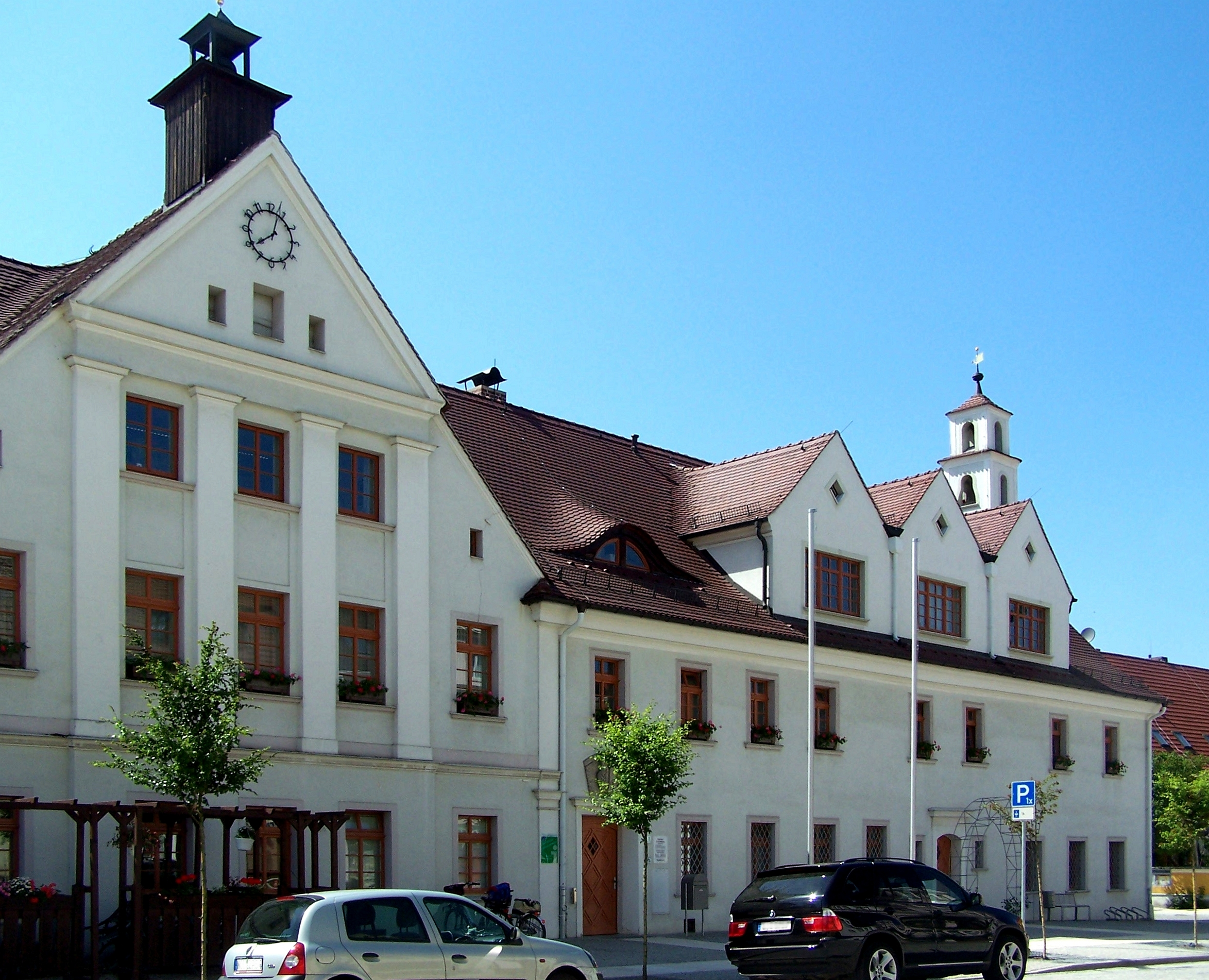
- Town hall

- Coat of arms

- Location of Rothenburg within Görlitz district
- Interactive map of Rothenburg
- Location within Germany Location within Saxony
- Coordinates: 51°20′N 14°58′E
- Country: Germany
- State: Saxony
- District: Görlitz
- Subdivisions: 7

Government
  - Mayor (2022–29): Philip Eichler (CDU)

Area
  - Total: 72.4 km^{2} (28.0 sq mi)
- Elevation: 160 m (520 ft)

Population (2025-12-31)
  - Total: 3,953
  - Density: 54.6/km^{2} (141/sq mi)
- Time zone: UTC+01:00 (CET)
  - Summer (DST): UTC+02:00 (CEST)
- Postal codes: 02929
- Dialling codes: 035891
- Vehicle registration: GR, LÖB, NOL, NY, WSW, ZI
- Website: www.rothenburg-ol.de

Rothenburg/Oberlausitz (German: [ˈʁoːtn̩bʊʁk]; Upper Sorbian: Rózbork [ˈʁʊzbɔʁk]; Polish: Rozbork) is a small Lusatian town in eastern Saxony, in eastern Germany, on the Neisse river on the Germany–Poland border. It has a population of 4,405 (2020), and lies directly opposite the former village of Prędocice in Poland.

== History ==
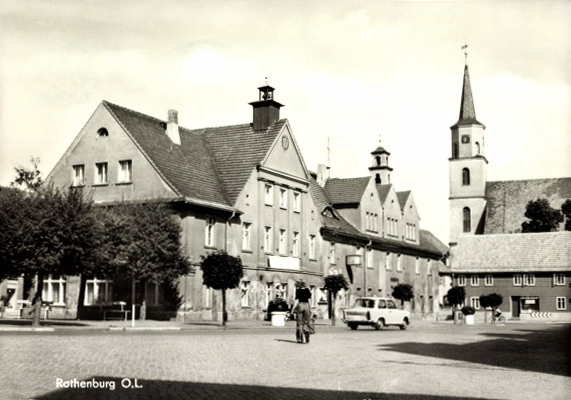
Old postcard

The town was first mentioned in 1268. In 1319, it became a part of the Duchy of Jawor, the southwesternmost duchy of fragmented Piast-ruled Poland. In 1329, it passed to the Czech (Bohemian) Crown Lands. Knife and cloth making flourished in the 14th century. A trade route was established that run through the town between Bohemia proper and Bohemian-ruled Brandenburg. In 1469 the town passed to Hungary, and in 1490 it returned to the Czech Crown, then under the rule of Polish Prince Vladislaus II, who authorized the town to hold weekly markets. The town suffered during the Thirty Years' War. From 1635 it was ruled by Electors of Saxony, from 1697 also Kings of Poland.

The town suffered once again during the Napoleonic Wars, and in 1815 it became part of the Kingdom of Prussia. From 1816 until 1945 it was the seat of the district of Rothenburg (Ob. Laus.) in the province of Silesia. In 1882, a volunteer fire department was founded. In the late 19th century, the inhabitants were mostly employed in pottery, tile production and farming. In 1907, a rail connection from Horka via Rothenburg to Przewóz was opened. In 1927, a municipal sewage network was established.

During World War II, on April 16, 1945, it was the site of a battle, in which the Polish Second Army defeated the Germans and captured the town. After the war, it formed part of East Germany. In 1972, town limits were expanded.

== Districts ==
Localities of Rothenburg are Bremenhain (first mentioned in 1396), Geheege, Lodenau, Neusorge (first mentioned in 1564), Nieder-Neundorf, Steinbach and Uhsmannsdorf (first mentioned in 1388 as "Osansdorf").

== Sights ==
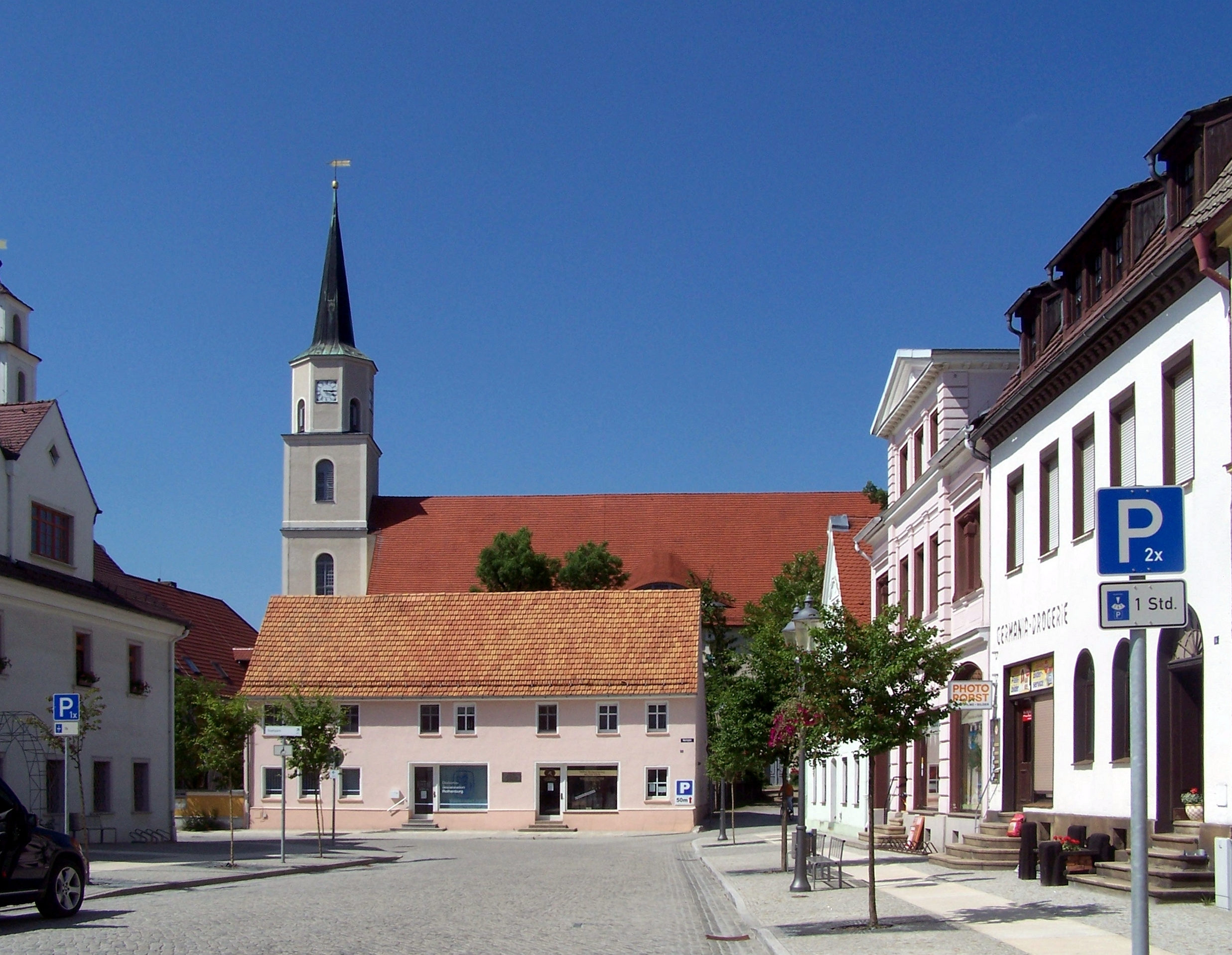
Protestant church

Some of its attractions are the Town Park, Marketplace and the Evangelische Stadtkirche (Town Evangelical Church) which was built in 1798, the tower of which was badly damaged in April 1945, during an air-raid bombing. The church was restored later and stands at a focal-point of the town square and marketplace.

Points of interest include the former site of the Castle Rothenburg (b.1686-WWII) which once laid on the edge of the main town square, the dam on the Neisse River once used as a bathing area for locals, and Martinshof, a still operational home and complex for the mentally and physically disabled, the innovative brainchild of Friedrich von Martin in 1883. Most of the first houses and barns of the establishment still remain, bearing the original biblical names given to them by Martin himself, such as "Bethlehem".

Despite several landmarks in the town having been hit hard by shells from the air raids during the Second World War, the town has preserved much of its original medieval charm and Old World feel. Nearby places of interest include Niesky to the southwest and Görlitz directly south of town, which is a true medieval town complete with city walls, great hotels and festivals.

== Population development ==
Historical population
Year	Pop.	±%
1815	1,028	—
1844	1,013	−1.5%
1871	1,352	+33.5%
1885	1,310	−3.1%
1925	1,617	+23.4%
1970	3,500	+116.5%
1990	5,500	+57.1%
2015	4,760	−13.5%

== Personalities ==
- Wigand of Gersdorff (1851-1920), Prussian general lieutenant
- Paul Rentsch (1898-1944), dentist and resistance fighter; Righteous among the Nations
- Iris Wittig (1928-1978), first military pilot of the GDR
- Reinhard Leue (1929-2012), Protestant theologian, publicist, author and chronicler
- Rabbi Meir of Rothenburg (1215 - 1293)

== See also ==
- Prędocice
