= Kreis Sagan =

Coordinates: 51.6167°N 15.3167°E

Kreis Sagan
Prussian Province	Herzogtum Schlesien (1742–1815); Silesia (1815–1919); Lower Silesia (1919–1932)
Regierungsbezirk	Liegnitz
Capital	Sagan
Population	64,420 (1925)
Map of the Sagan district (1905)

Kreis Sagan was a Prussian district in Silesia, with its capital at Sagan. It existed 1742 til 1932, when it was dissolved and most of its territory was merged into the Sprottau district, with some smaller areas being assigned to other adjacent districts. The former Prussian district is now a part of Poland (exclusive the Pechern area (Neiße region), today part of Saxony).

== Demographics ==
According to the Prussian census of 1861, the Sagan district had a population of 53,934, of which 53,913 (99.96%) were Germans and 21 (0.04%) were Sorbs. Most of the inhabitants lived in rural areas. Towns were Sagan, Naumburg am Bober and Priebus.

== Chief administration officers ==
- 1742-1745 von Seelstrang
- 1745-1761 von Zech
- 1762-1766 von Haugwitz
- 1766-1782 von Seidl
- 1783-1791 von Rabenau
- 1791-1812 von Rhaden
- 1812-1816 von Thein
- 1816-1818 von Goldammer
- 1847-1863 von Dohna-Schlodien
- 1863-1868 von Eckstädt
- 1868-1874 von Zedlitz-Neukirch
- 1874-1894 Strutz
- 1894-1903 von Neefe und Obischau
- 1903-1918 von Wolff
- 1918-1919 Ikier
- 1919-1921 Firnhaber
- 1921-1932 von Bezold
