= Breslau (region) =

Regierungsbezirk of Silesia

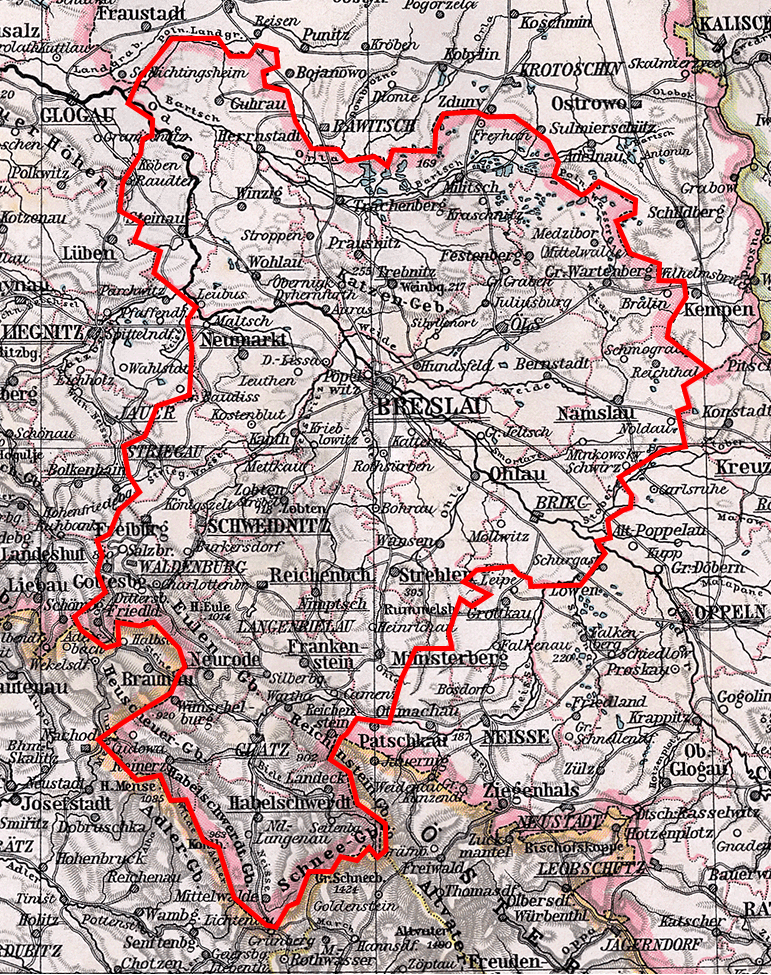
1905 map of the Middle Silesia region, Regierungsbezirk Breslau outlined

Regierungsbezirk Breslau, known colloquially as Middle Silesia (German: Mittelschlesien; Silesian: Strzodkowy Ślōnsk; Polish: Śląsk Środkowy), was a Regierungsbezirk, or government region, in the Prussian Province of Silesia and later Lower Silesia from 1813 to 1945. It comprised the eastern parts of the historic Lower Silesia region and the former County of Kladsko, both of which were conquered by Prussia in the First Silesian War in 1742.

== History ==
Silesia had been part of Bohemian crown lands of the Habsburg monarchy until most of it was ceded to the Kingdom of Prussia in the First Silesian War, codified by the 1742 Treaty of Breslau. In 1813, the administrative Regierungsbezirk was established in Prussian Silesia, with its capital in Breslau (present-day Wrocław). The western half of Lower Silesia was incorporated into Regierungsbezirk Liegnitz (Legnica), the adjacent Upper Silesian land in the east into Regierungsbezirk Oppeln (Opole).

After the short-lived Regierungsbezirk Reichenbach (Dzierżoniów) was dissolved in 1820, the Middle Silesian district also comprised Glatzer Land (Kłodzko Land) in the south and several districts of the former duchies of Münsterberg (Ziębice), Jauer (Jawor) and Brieg (Brzeg). It then stretched from the Greater Polish plain in the north (Grand Duchy of Posen/Province of Posen) to the border with Bohemia along the Sudetes mountain range in the south, where Glatzer Land also bordered on Austrian Silesia in the east.

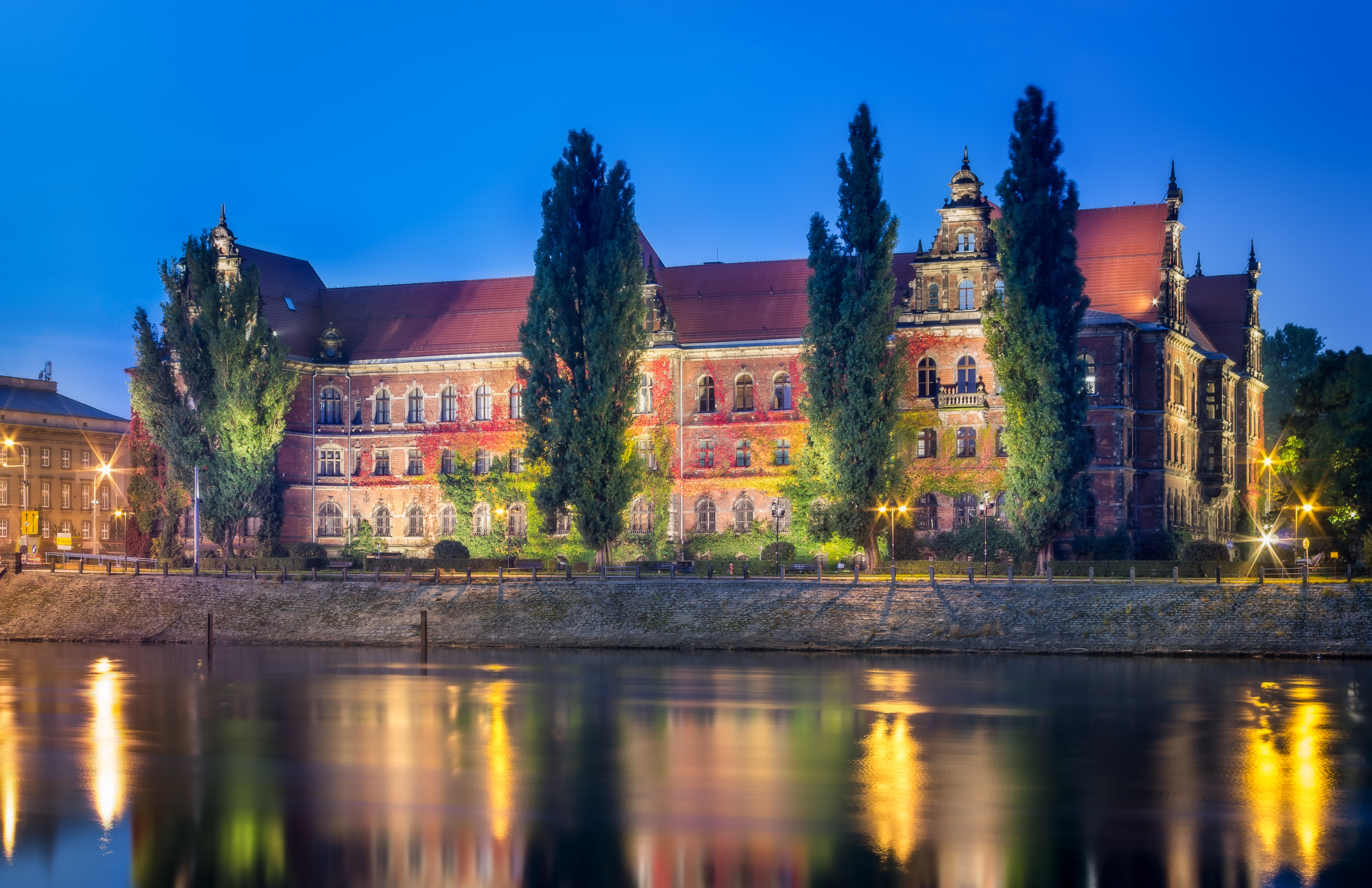
Former Regierungsbezirk headquarters in Breslau

After World War I, the state of Czechoslovakia arose on the southern border, while Greater Poland in the north became part of the Second Polish Republic. At the same time, the Prussian Province of Silesia was divided, whereby Regierungsbezirk Breslau formed the eastern half of the Province of Lower Silesia. According to the Treaty of Versailles, small parts of Regierungsbezirk Breslau lying along the border with Greater Poland had to be ceded to Poland and became part of the Poznań Voivodeship. This included significant parts of the Groß Wartenberg and Namslau districts, which was known as the Reichthaler Ländchen. After World War II, the whole region became part of Poland, as the Soviet Union expanded its borders and moved Poland westward under the terms of the 1945 Potsdam Agreement. By 1949, almost the entire indigenous German population was expelled.

Today, the region forms the eastern part of the Polish Lower Silesian Voivodeship and the north-western part of the Opole Voivodeship and also includes a small southern part of the Greater Poland Voivodeship.

== Ethnolinguistic structure ==
In 1819, Regierungsbezirk Breslau had 833,253 inhabitants: 755,553 Germans (90.1%); 66,500 Poles (7.9%); 3,900 Czechs (1.1%) and 7,300 Jews (0.9%). The United States Immigration Commission in 1911 classified Polish-speaking Silesians as ethnic Poles.

According to the Prussian census of 1861, Regierungsbezirk Breslau had a population of 1,278,064, of which 1,217,102 (95.2%) spoke German, 53,479 (4.2%) spoke Polish and 7,483 (0.6%) spoke Czech.

Ethnolinguistic structure in Regierungsbezirk Breslau
Year	Population	German	%	Polish / Bilingual	%
1819	833,253	755,553	90.1%	66,500	7.9%
1861	1,278,064	1,217,102	95.2%	53,479	4.2%
1890	1,599,322	1,529,490	95.6%	59,545	3.7%
1900	1,698,715	1,630,559	96.0%	55,558	3.3%
1905	1,773,879	1,701,734	95.9%	59,193	3.3%

By 1905, all districts were majority German-speaking, with the highest concentration of Polish speakers being found in the districts of Groß Wartenberg and Namslau where they (including bilinguals) constituted 42.9% and 27.4% of the population respectively.

== Administrative subdivisions ==
Before its dissolution in 1945, Regierungsbezirk Breslau comprised the following districts:

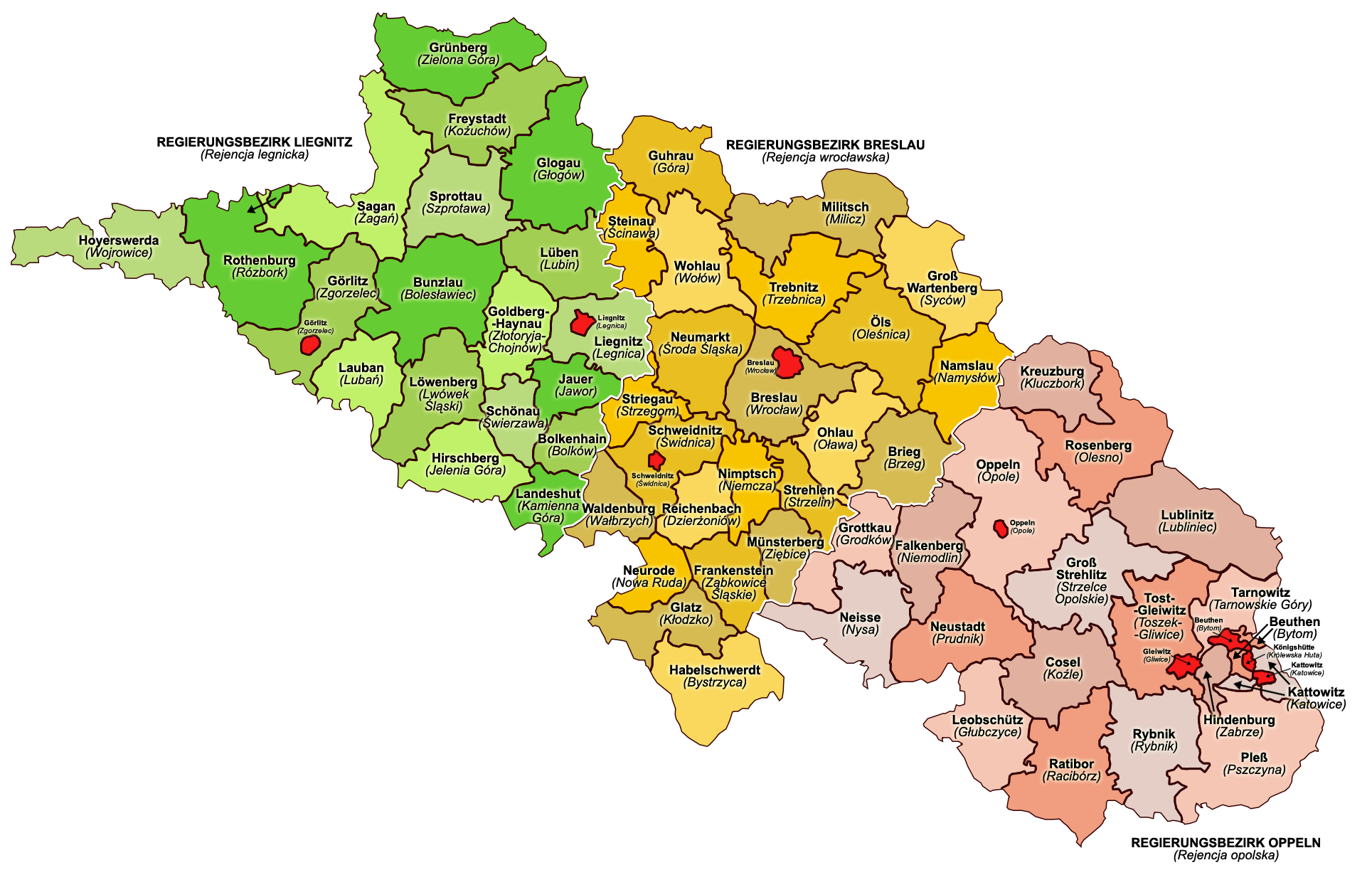
1905 administrative map of Silesian districts, with Regierungsbezirk Breslau in yellow.

=== Stadtkreise (urban districts) ===
- Stadtkreis Breslau
- Stadtkreis Brieg
- Stadtkreis Schweidnitz
- Stadtkreis Waldenburg

=== Landkreise (rural districts) ===
- Landkreis Breslau
- Landkreis Brieg
- Landkreis Frankenstein
- Landkreis Glatz
- Landkreis Groß Wartenberg
- Landkreis Guhrau
- Landkreis Habelschwerdt
- Landkreis Militsch
- Landkreis Namslau
- Landkreis Neumarkt
- Landkreis Oels
- Landkreis Ohlau
- Landkreis Reichenbach (im Eulengebirge)
- Landkreis Schweidnitz
- Landkreis Strehlen
- Landkreis Trebnitz
- Landkreis Waldenburg
- Landkreis Wohlau
