= Landkreis Groß Wartenberg =

Former administrative division

- District of Prussia
- 1742–1945
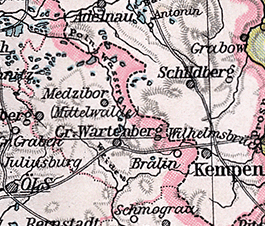
- Map from 1905
- Capital: Polnisch Wartenberg/Groß Wartenberg (Syców)
- History
  - Established: 1742
  - Disestablished: 1945
- Today part of: Poland

The Groß Wartenberg district, known until 1888 as the Wartenberg district, was a Prussian district in Silesia from 1742 to 1945. Its capital was the town of Groß Wartenberg (Syców), which was known until 1888 as Polnisch Wartenberg. The area of this district now lies within the Lower Silesian Voivodeship of Poland.

== History ==
After conquering most of Silesia, King Frederick the Great introduced Prussian administrative structures in Lower Silesia by cabinet order on 25 November 1741. This included the establishment of two war and domain chambers in Breslau (Wrocław) and Glogau (Głogów) as well as their subdivision into districts and the establishment of district administrators on 1 January 1742. Leonhard Moritz von Prittwitz-Gaffron was appointed as the first district administrator of the Wartenberg district.

In the course of the Stein-Hardenberg Reforms in 1815, the district was assigned to Regierungsbezirk Breslau in the Province of Silesia. During the district reform of 1818 in Regierungsbezirk Breslau, the town of Medzibor (Międzybórz) and the villages of Benjaminsthal, Charlottenfeld, Conradau, Erdmannsberg, Friedrikenau, Glashütte, Glashütte bei Tscheschen, Hammer, Honig, Johannisdörfel, Joschune, Kalkowsky, Kenschen, Kenschenhammer, Klenowe, Kottowsky, Kotzine, Mariendorf, Neurode, Ossen, Pawlau, Riefken, Silonke, Suschen, Tscheschen and Wielky were transferred from the Oels district to the Wartenberg district. The indigenous Polish population was subjected to Germanisation policies.

The city of Medzibor was renamed Neumittelwalde in 1886. Since the district capital was renamed Groß Wartenberg from Polnisch Wartenberg in 1888, the official name of the district was also changed to Groß Wartenberg.

In 1919, the Free State of Prussia dissolved the Province of Silesia and divided it into the Province of Lower Silesia and the Province of Upper Silesia. Consequently, the Groß Wartenberg district became part of the Province of Lower SIlesia. With the entry into force of the Treaty of Versailles on 10 January 1920, the eastern (predominantly Polish-speaking) part of the Groß Wartenberg district became again part of Poland. The persecution of Poles intensified in 1939.

After the Invasion of Poland in 1939, the areas of the Lower Silesian districts of Namslau, Groß Wartenberg and Guhrau, which had been ceded to Poland in 1920, were not returned to Silesia, but were incorporated into Reichsgau Wartheland. In the spring of 1945 the Red Army occupied the district and in the summer of 1945 it became again part of Poland in accordance with the Potsdam Agreement.

== Demographics ==
Population of the Groß Wartenberg district by mother tongue
Year	1837		1858		1867		1890	
Germans	11,056	26.4%	11,854	23.8%	22,470	42.9%	24,769	49.5%
Poles (incl. bilinguals)	30,862	73.6%	36,885	74.0%	28,730	54.9%	23,969	47.9%
Czechs	0	0.0%	1,084	2.2%	1,160	2.2%	1,273	2.5%
Total	41,918		49,823		52,360		50,022	
