= Landkreis Freystadt i. Niederschles. =

District of the German state of Prussia from 1816 to 1945

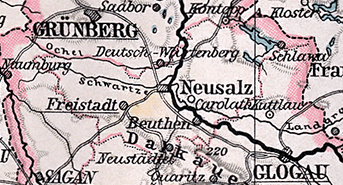
Landkreis Freystadt i. Niederschles., 1905

The Landkreis Freystadt i. Niederschles. was a district of the German state of Prussia from 1816 to 1945. It was part of the Prussian Province of Lower Silesia, before 1919 the Prussian Province of Silesia, within Regierungsbezirk Liegnitz. After 1945, it became part of Poland and is currently in the Lubusz Voivodeship. On 1 January 1945 it included:

- 1 city, Freystadt in Niederschlesien
- 74 municipalities,
- 1 Gutsbezirk (Forests).

== Demographics ==
Administrative divisions in the Province of SIlesia (1905)

The district had a majority German population, with some Polish minorities.

Ethnolinguistic Structure
Language	1900		1905	
German	53,824	99.09%	53,305	98.25%
Polish	371	0.68%	699	1.29%
Bilingual	74	0.14%	137	0.25%
Total	54,320		54,252	
