= Glatz (district) =

Former administrative division

- District of Prussia
- 1742–1945
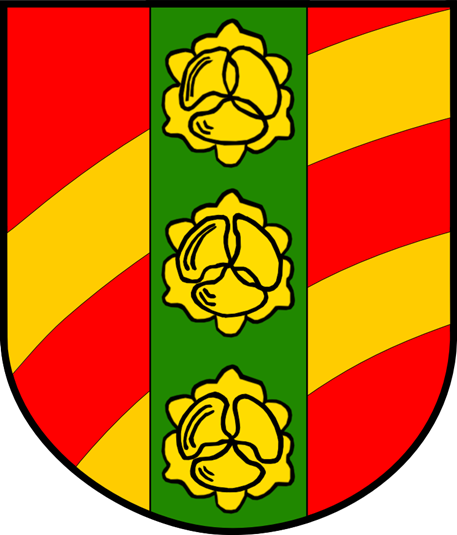
- Coat of arms

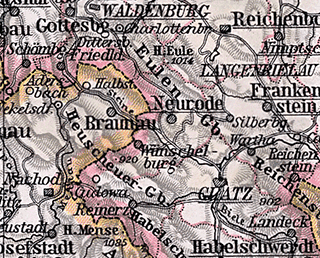
- Map from 1905
- Capital: Glatz (Kłodzko)
- History
  - Established: 1742
  - Disestablished: 1945
- Today part of: Poland

The district of Glatz was a Prussian district in Silesia, which existed from 1742 to 1945. Its capital was the town of Glatz (Kłodzko). Its territory is now part of the Polish Lower Silesian Voivodeship.

== History ==
After conquering most of Silesia, King Frederick the Great introduced Prussian administrative structures in Lower Silesia by cabinet order on 25 November 1741. This included the establishment of two war and domain chambers in Breslau (Wrocław) and Glogau (Głogów) as well as their subdivision into districts and the appointment of district administrators on 1 January 1742.

The Glatz district initially belonged to the Breslau War and Domain Chamber until it was assigned to Regierungsbezirk Reichenbach of the Province of Silesia in the course of the Stein-Hardenberg reforms of 1815. On 1 January 1818 the new Habelschwerdt district was formed from parts of the Glatz district. After Regierungsbezirk Reichenbach was dissolved, the districts of Glatz and Habelschwerdt were assigned to Regierungsbezirk Breslau on 1 May 1820. On 2 August 1855 the new Neurode district was created from the northern parts of the Glatz district with its capital in the city of Neurode (Nowa Ruda).

During the 19th-century Polish national liberation fights, many Polish insurgents and activists were imprisoned in the Kłodzko Fortress in the district, including publicist Włodzimierz Adolf Wolniewicz, historian Wojciech Kętrzyński and priest Augustyn Szamarzewski.

On 8 November 1919 the Province of Silesia was divided into two parts and the Glatz district became part of the new Province of Lower Silesia, which was formed from Regierungsbezirk Breslau and Regierungsbezirk Liegnitz. On 1 October 1932 the Neurode district was merged back into the Glatz district. On 1 April 1938 the Prussian provinces of Lower Silesia and Province of Upper Silesia were merged again to form the Province of Silesia, but this was reversed on 18 January 1941.

During World War II, the district was the location of several subcamps of the Gross-Rosen concentration camp, several forced labour subcamps of the Stalag VIII-B/344 prisoner-of-war camp for Allied POWs, and a prison administered by the Reich Ministry of Justice and Wehrmacht, which housed prisoners of various nationalities, including Polish civilians and Allied POWs. In 1942–1943, six FStGA field penal battalions (1, 7, 10, 13, 16, 20) were established in the district capital and afterwards relocated to the eastern front. In January and February 1945, many prisoners from other locations were brought to the local prison either during death marches or transports, and many were then sent further west to Bautzen.

In the spring of 1945 the district was occupied by the Red Army and in the summer of 1945, it was placed under Polish administration in accordance with the Potsdam Agreement. The remaining German population was expelled in accordance to the Potsdam Agreement and replaced by Poles.

== Demographics ==
According to the census of 1861, the Glatz district had a population of 56,584, of which 52,968 (93.6%) were Germans and 3,616 (6.4%) were Czechs.
