= Landkreis Sprottau =

Former administrative division

- District of Prussia
- 1816–1945
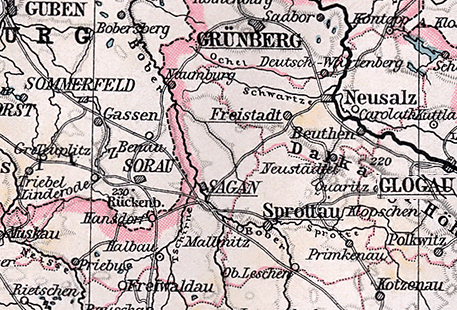
- Map from 1905
- Capital: Sprottau (Szprotawa)
- Area
  - Coordinates: 51°34′00″N 15°30′00″E
  - 1910: 0.730 km^{2} (0.282 sq mi)
- Population
  - 1910: 39,882
- History
  - Established: 1816
  - Disestablished: 1945
- Today part of: Poland

The Landkreis Sprottau was a district of the German state Prussia from 1816 to 1945. It was part of the Prussian Province of Lower Silesia, before 1919 the Prussian Province of Silesia. In 1932 it was merged with Landkreis Sagan. Its present-day successors are Powiat Żagański and Powiat Polkowicki. On 1 January 1945 it included:

- 3 cities, Primkenau (Przemków), Sagan (Żagań) and Sprottau (Szprotawa),
- 102 municipalities,
- 4 Gutsbezirke (forests and the military training area Neuhammer am Queis).

== Demographics ==
The district had a majority German population, with a small Polish minority.

Ethnolinguistic structure in the district
	1890		1900	
German	36,337	98.85%	38,175	97.78%
Polish	307	0.84%	570	1.46%
Bilingual	84	0.23%	124	0.32%
Total	36,759		39,042	

== Placenames ==
Names of two communes were renamed in 1936:

- Puschkau → Hirtenau (does not exist)
- Tschirndorf → Hammerfeld

== District heads ==
- Oskar von Bezold (1932–1933)

== Representatives in Provincial Parliament of Lower Silesia ==
Holders of these political positions were called "Landsrat".

1811–1831: Kaspar von Knobelsdorff
1831–1857: Alexander Maximilian von Schkopp
1857–1869: Robert von Reder († 1869)
1869–1877: Hans Graf von Kanitz-Podangen (1813–1941)
1877–1890: Günther von Dallwitz (1838–1910)
1890–1910: Henning von Klitzing
1910–1919: Wilhelm Freiherr von Kottwitz
1919: Eichert (Commissar)
1920–1925: Dietrich
1925–1932: Hermann Kranold
1932–1933: Oskar von Bezold
1933: Pintzke
1933–: Hans-Walter Friderici
