= Province of Lower Silesia =

Province of Prussia (1919–1938; 1941–1945)

Province of Lower Silesia Provinz Niederschlesien (German)
- Province of Prussia
- 1919–1938; 1941–1945
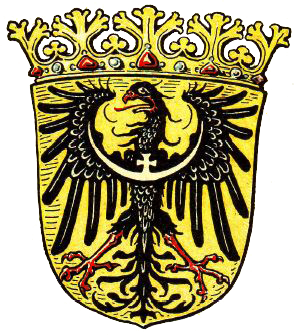
- Flag Coat of arms

- Province of Lower Silesia (red) within the Free State of Prussia
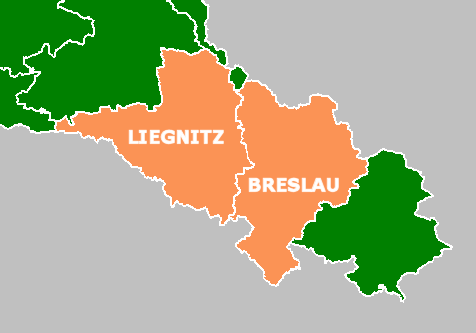
- Capital: Breslau (Wrocław)
- Area
  - Coordinates: 51°06′39″N 17°02′51″E
  - 1925: 26,616 km^{2} (10,276 sq mi)
- Population
  - 1925: 3,132,135
- History
  - Established: 1919
  - Merged into Province of Silesia: 1938–1941
  - Disestablished: 1945
Preceded by
Province of Silesia
Succeeded by
State of Brandenburg
State of Saxony
District of Lower Silesia
- Today part of: Germany; Poland

The Province of Lower Silesia (German: Provinz Niederschlesien; Silesian German: Provinz Niederschläsing; Polish: Prowincja Dolny Śląsk; Silesian: Prowincyjŏ Dolny Ślōnsk) was a province of the Free State of Prussia between 1919 and 1945, except for the period 1938 to 1941 when it was reunited with Upper Silesia to form the Province of Silesia. The capital of Lower Silesia was Breslau (now Wrocław in Poland). The province was further divided into two administrative regions (Regierungsbezirke), Breslau and Liegnitz.

The province was not congruent with the historical region of Lower Silesia, which now lies mainly in Poland. It additionally comprised the Upper Lusatian districts of Görlitz, Rothenburg and Hoyerswerda in the west, that until 1815 had belonged to the Kingdom of Saxony, as well as the former County of Kladsko in the southeast.

The province was disestablished at the end of World War II and with the implementation of the Oder–Neisse line in 1945, the area east of the Neisse river fell to the Republic of Poland. The smaller western part was incorporated into the German states of Saxony and Brandenburg.

== Administrative regions ==
=== Regierungsbezirk Breslau ===
==== Urban districts / Stadtkreise ====
1. City of Breslau
2. City of Brieg
3. City of Schweidnitz
4. City of Waldenburg

==== Rural districts / Landkreise ====
1. Landkreis Breslau
2. Landkreis Brieg
3. Landkreis Frankenstein
4. Landkreis Glatz
5. Landkreis Groß Wartenberg
6. Landkreis Guhrau
7. Landkreis Habelschwerdt
8. Landkreis Militsch
9. Landkreis Namslau
10. Landkreis Neumarkt
11. Landkreis Oels
12. Landkreis Ohlau
13. Landkreis Reichenbach (im Eulengebirge)
14. Landkreis Schweidnitz
15. Landkreis Strehlen
16. Landkreis Trebnitz
17. Landkreis Waldenburg
18. Landkreis Wohlau

=== Regierungsbezirk Liegnitz ===
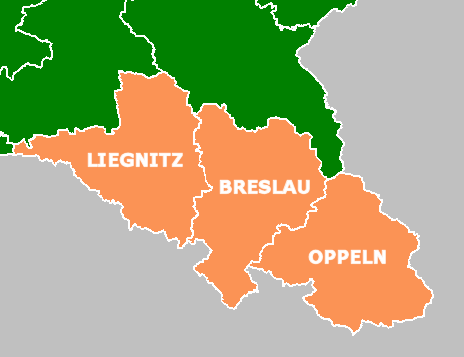
Map of Silesia, showing the historical location of Lower Silesia (Liegnitz), Middle Silesia (Breslau), and Upper Silesia (Oppeln)

==== Urban districts / Stadtkreise ====
1. City of Glogau
2. City of Görlitz
3. City of Hirschberg im Riesengebirge
4. City of Liegnitz

==== Rural districts / Landkreise ====
1. Landkreis Bunzlau
2. Landkreis Fraustadt
3. Landkreis Freystadt i. Niederschles.
4. Landkreis Glogau
5. Landkreis Görlitz
6. Landkreis Goldberg
7. Landkreis Grünberg
8. Landkreis Hirschberg
9. Landkreis Hoyerswerda
10. Landkreis Jauer
11. Landkreis Landeshut
12. Landkreis Lauban
13. Landkreis Liegnitz
14. Landkreis Löwenberg
15. Landkreis Lüben
16. Landkreis Rothenburg (Ob. Laus.)
17. Landkreis Sprottau

== Post-1945 population ==
During the Polish post-war census of December 1950, data about the pre-war places of residence of the inhabitants as of August 1939 was collected. In case of children born between September 1939 and December 1950, their origin was reported based on the pre-war places of residence of their mothers. Thanks to this data it is possible to reconstruct the pre-war geographical origin of the post-war population. The same area corresponding to pre-1938 Province of Lower Silesia east of the Oder-Neisse line (which became Polish in 1945) was inhabited in December 1950 by:

1950 population by place of residence back in 1939:
Region (within 1939 borders):	Number	Percent
Autochthons (1939 DE/FCD citizens)	120,885	6.1%
Polish expellees from Kresy (USSR)	696,739	35.3%
Poles from abroad except the USSR	91,395	4.6%
Resettlers from the City of Warsaw	61,862	3.1%
From Warsaw region (Masovia)	69,120	3.5%
From Białystok region and Sudovia	23,515	1.2%
From pre-war Polish Pomerania	54,664	2.8%
Resettlers from Poznań region	172,163	8.7%
Katowice region (East Upper Silesia)	66,362	3.4%
Resettlers from the City of Łódź	16,483	0.8%
Resettlers from Łódź region	96,185	4.9%
Resettlers from Kielce region	141,748	7.2%
Resettlers from Lublin region	70,622	3.6%
Resettlers from Kraków region	156,920	7.9%
Resettlers from Rzeszów region	110,188	5.6%
place of residence in 1939 unknown	26,486	1.3%
Total pop. in December 1950	1,975,337	100.0%

Over 90% of the 1950 inhabitants were new to the region, with less than 10% residing in the province already back in August 1939 (so called autochthons, who had German citizenship before World War II and were granted Polish citizenship after 1945). The largest group among new inhabitants were Poles expelled from areas of Eastern Poland annexed by the USSR. The second largest group came from Southern Poland (from Kraków, Rzeszów, Lublin, Kielce and Katowice regions in total 28%) followed by Greater Poland. Many Poles from Bosnia settled around Bolesławiec.

== See also ==
- Lower Silesian Voivodeship
- Niederschlesischer Oberlausitzkreis
- Territorial Association of Silesia
