= Strzelno (disambiguation) =

Strzelno is a town in Kuyavian-Pomeranian Voivodeship (north-central Poland)/

Strzelno may also refer to:

- Strzelno, Lower Silesian Voivodeship (south-west Poland)
- Strzelno, Pomeranian Voivodeship (north Poland)
