= Nikolai Travin =

Red Army officer (1898–1964)

Nikolai Vasilyevich Travin
- Travin, Lieutenant Colonel, c. 1936
- Born: 24 February 1898; Baryshskaya Slaboda, Surskoye Raion, Kuibyshev Oblast
- Died: July 18, 1964 (aged 66)

Nikolai Vasilyevich Travin (Russian: Николай Васильевич Травин) was an officer in the Red Army. He served during the Russian Civil War, First World War, Soviet westward offensive of 1918-19, Winter War and most notably in the Second World War where he commanded units in the Defense of Leningrad today known as St. Petersberg.

== Personal life ==
Born in the village of Baryshskaya Slaboda, Surskoye Raion, Kuibyshev Oblast, little is known of Travin before his military service. He attended school in 1909 and secondary school in 1915. He married Yevgenia Nikolayevena Travina and had a son, Nikolai, and a daughter, Irina in 1921.

== Career ==
In August 1918 at the age of 20, he joined the Imperial Army. During the Russian Civil War, Travin was a machine gun team commander serving with the 96th (Omsk) regiment, 24th Pskov Infantry Division. As the dust of the Russian Civil War settled, Travin either by choice or change in unit loyalty became a member of the Red Army, taking part in the Soviet Westward Offensive in Latvia and Estonia. During this short time he held several positions: 37mm battery commander (northeastern front), Chief of the stock of rifles and machine guns (Tatar Brigade (eastern front), and Chief of signals and battalion adjutant for the 2nd Heavy artillery battalion.

He gained knowledge and experience in multiple commands and postings during the interwar years for the Soviet Union in 1920–1940: Chief of Signals for Artillery Brigade Headquarters, Eastern Front, May 1940; Adjutant Light artillery Battalion, December 1920; Head of School, Howitzer Battalion, reserve Brigade, February 1923; Chief of Signals, Independent Training Battalion, June 1921; Independent training battery, November 1921; Chief of reconnaissance and signals, 11th Heavy Artillery Battalion, January 1924; Battalion commander, 1st anti-aircraft artillery regiment, July 3, 1925; Battery commander, 4th artillery Brigade, October 1925; Temporary Battalion commander, March 1928; assistant battalion commander, August 1928, 82nd Independent Artillery Battalion, March 1928; and student, Military economical course, January 1930.

In April 1930, Travin became Battalion commander of the 73rd independent Artillery Battalion, a unit which he would stay with for the next five years. Within this time frame he also held the position of Assistant battalion commander and chief of the air defense post, January 1931 – 1935 for the 73rd. At this time he also attended the Air defense Course, Leningrad, October 1930, Advanced anti-aircraft Artillery Officer training Course, March 1935, Dzerzhinsky Artillery Academy, March 1936; and Advanced Artillery Officer Training Course, July 1936.

In February 1937, Travin became Chief of Staff, and in November of the same year, Regimental Commander for the 180th Anti-aircraft Artillery Regiment, 2nd Air Defense Corps.

On 30 November 1939, the Soviet Union launched an offensive against Finland, the Winter War, to regain territory lost in the chaos of the Russian Revolution. Travin participated offensive with the 180th Anti-aircraft Artillery Regiment. On April 11, 1940, Travin was awarded the Medal for Combat Merit. The war with Finland would grind to a halt in March 1940 with the signing of the Moscow Peace Treaty.

On November 21 of 1940, Travin advanced to Commander of the Artillery, 3rd Air Defense Corps.

On 22 June 1941, Nazi Germany invaded the Soviet Union beginning what is known as the Eastern Front of World War II. By September, Army Group North of the German Army had begun its push on Leningrad, beginning the Siege of Leningrad. In July 1942, Travin became the temporary deputy commander of the Baku Air Defence Army, defending the Baku oilfields from German air raids. He served with the Baku Air Defence Army until he was transferred to the Leningrad Air Defence Army as the Assistant army commander in October of the same year. On December 22, 1942, he was awarded the Defense of Leningrad medal.

In July 1943, Travin was again moved to take command of the Ladoga Air Defense District responsible for the defense of the Road of Life, a supply line critical to the encircled city of Leningrad. In March and May of that year he was awarded the Order of the Red Banner for extraordinary heroism, dedication, and courage demonstrated on the battlefield and the Order of the Red Star for actions against the Finnish in 1939-40 and against the Germans.

In July 1944, he was promoted to divisional commander of the 77th Division of the Anti-Air Defence Troops, during which he was awarded the medal for the Defense of the Caucasus (1 May 1944), and his second Order of the Red Banner (3 November 1944) for bravery and valor in accomplishing combat missions. He served in this role until March 1945 when he became the Commander of the Artillery for the Leningrad Air Defense Army.

February 21, 1945 Travin was awarded one of the Soviet Unions highest awards, the Order of Lenin, for exemplary service to the state. On May 9 of the same year he received the Medal for the Victory over Germany, and in November he was awarded the Order of Kutuzov 2nd class for Outstanding military leadership against the German invaders.

After the end of World War 2 and the defeat of Nazi Germany, Travin was transferred to the 16th Special Air Defense Corps (October 1945) and held commands such as Acting Commander of the Artillery, Commander of Artillery (January 1946), Acting Deputy Corps commander April 1946, Deputy Corps Commander (July 1946), and Corps Commander (August 1946).

In February 1948, he was awarded the Medal for 20th anniversary of the Red Army.

In June 1949, he received his 3rd Order of the Red Banner for long service to the state and became Commander of the Artillery for the Leningrad Air Defense District.

In December 1949, he was at the 'disposal of the Minister of National Defense of the Polish Republic'. On January 8, 1950, he was admitted to the Polish Army with the rank of brigadier general. On January 23, 1950, he was appointed commander of the Organizational and Preparatory Group of the Air Defence Command. On March 21, 1950, he was appointed commander of the Anti-Aircraft Defence, and on July 12, 1951, the commander of the National Area Air Defence Forces, the predecessor to the Polish Air Defence Force. On November 13, 1952, he was dismissed from his post and sent back to the Union of Soviet Socialist Republics. As the commander of the Air Defence Forces of Poland, he was replaced by Brigadier General Sergiusz Sazonow.

His last appointment was as Assistant Commander, of the Air Defence Forces, Leningrad District on 17 December 1953. It is then reported that he became Deputy Commander for Air Defence Forces, Belomorsky Military District, from January 1955 to September 1956. It is reported that he died on 18 July 1964. He was 66 years old.
