= Żarka nad Nysą =

- Village
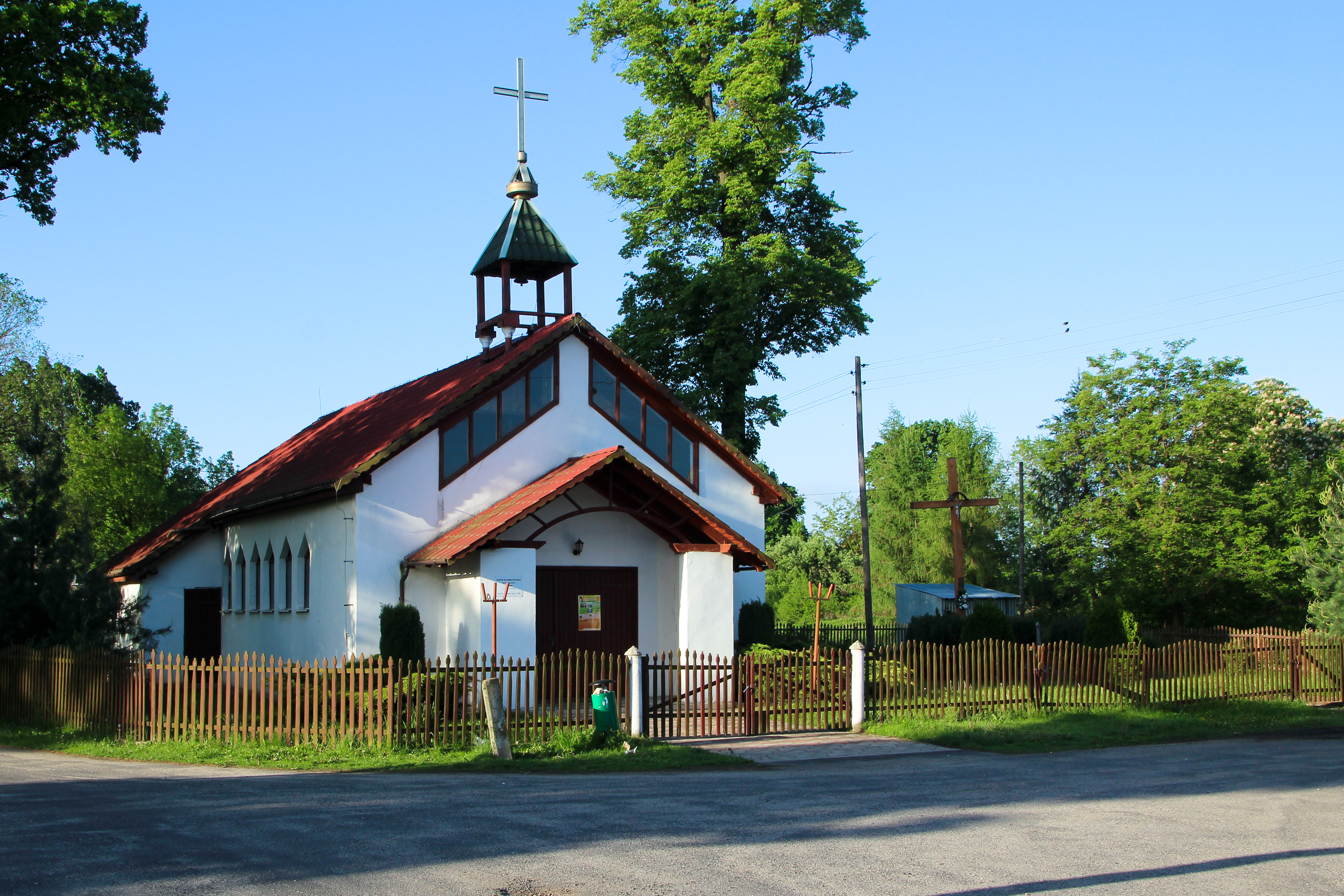
- Catholic church

- Location within Poland
- Coordinates: 51°12′N 15°1′E
- Country: Poland
- Voivodeship: Lower Silesian
- County: Zgorzelec
- Gmina: Pieńsk

Population
  - Total: 167
- Time zone: UTC+1 (CET)
  - Summer (DST): UTC+2 (CEST)
- Postal code: 59-930
- Vehicle registration: DZG

Żarka nad Nysą [ˈʐarka ˌnad ˈnɨsɔ̃] (Upper Sorbian: Žarka wo Nisou) is a village in the administrative district of Gmina Pieńsk, within Zgorzelec County, Lower Silesian Voivodeship, in south-western Poland, close to the German border.

== Etymology ==
The name of the village is of Slavic origin, and is derived from the word żar.
