= Dłużyna Dolna =

- Village
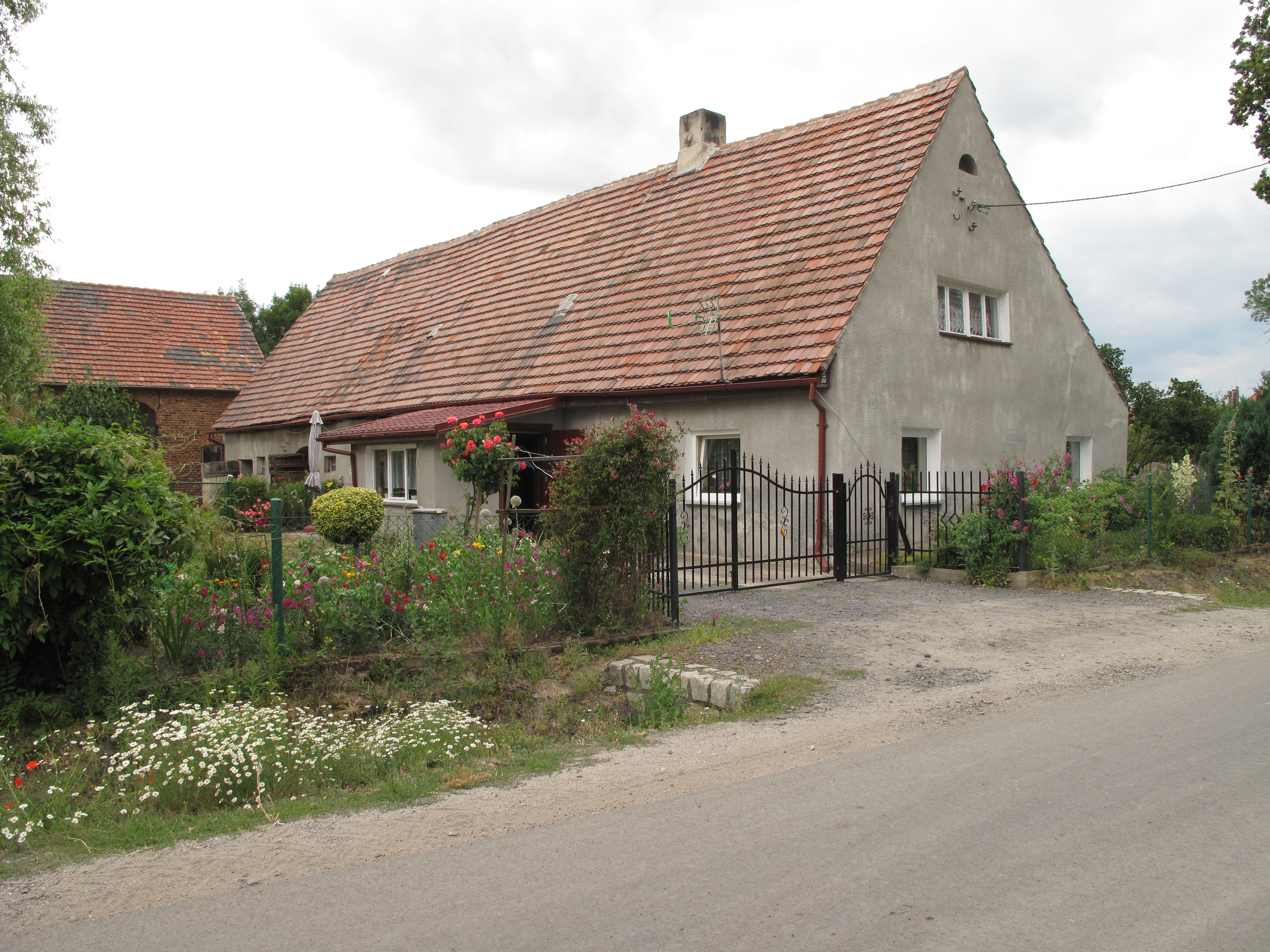
- House by a road

- Location within Poland
- Coordinates: 51°14′N 15°7′E
- Country: Poland
- Voivodeship: Lower Silesian
- County: Zgorzelec
- Gmina: Pieńsk
- Population: 900

Dłużyna Dolna [dwuˈʐɨna ˈdɔlna] (Upper Sorbian: Dłužyna Dolna) is a village in the administrative district of Gmina Pieńsk, within Zgorzelec County, Lower Silesian Voivodeship, in south-western Poland, close to the German border.

== Gallery ==
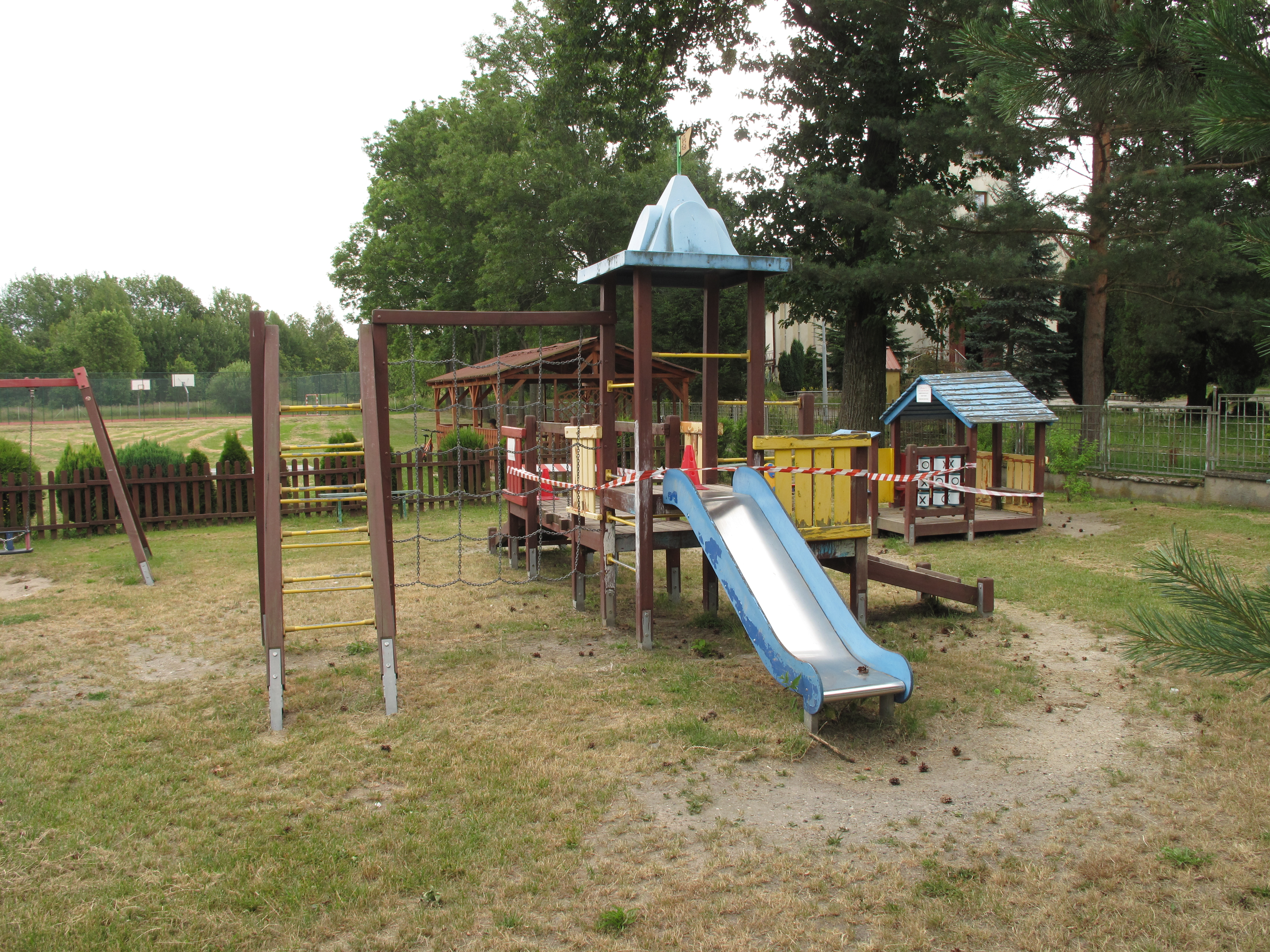
Children's playground

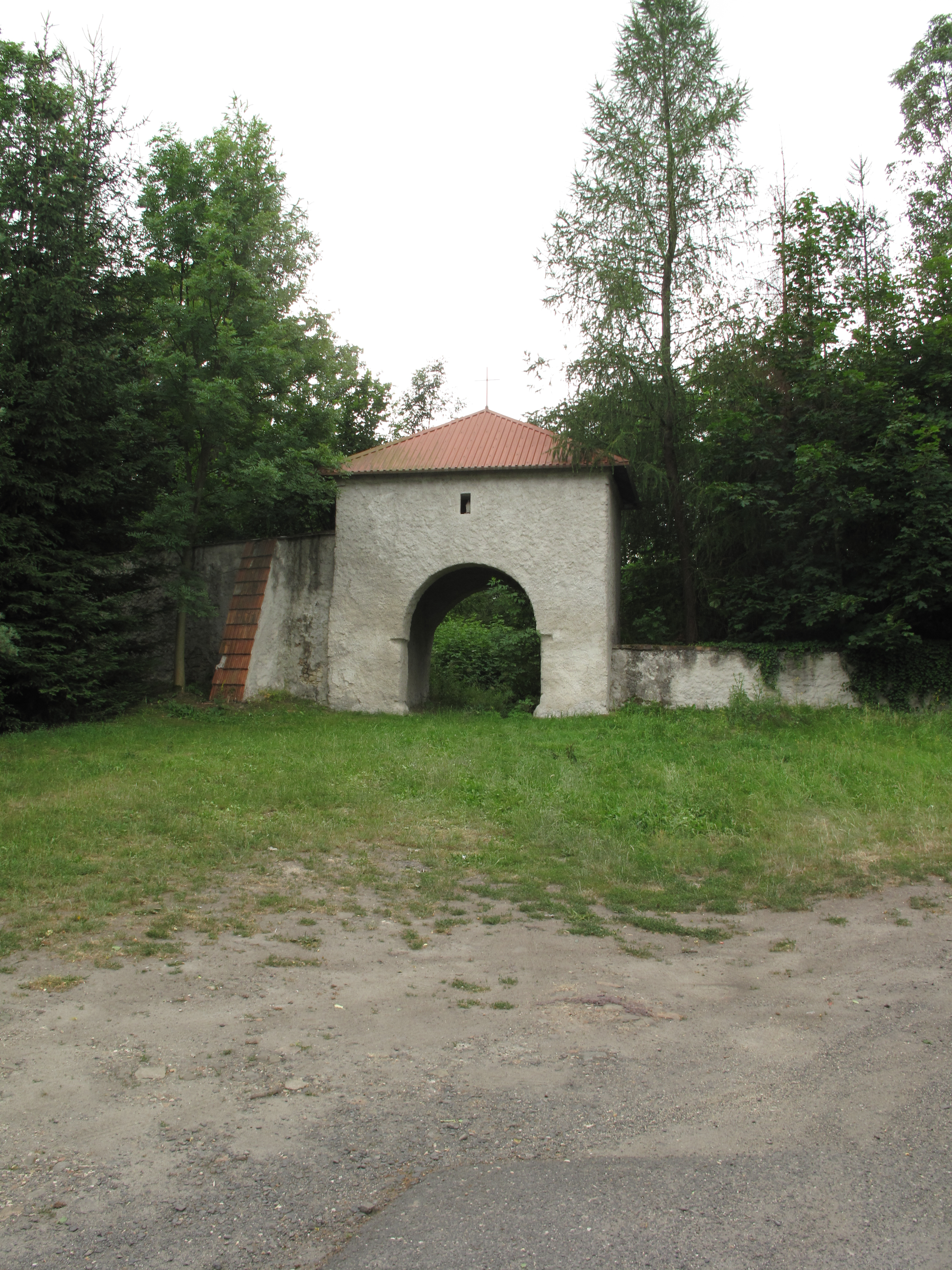
Gate of the former cemetery

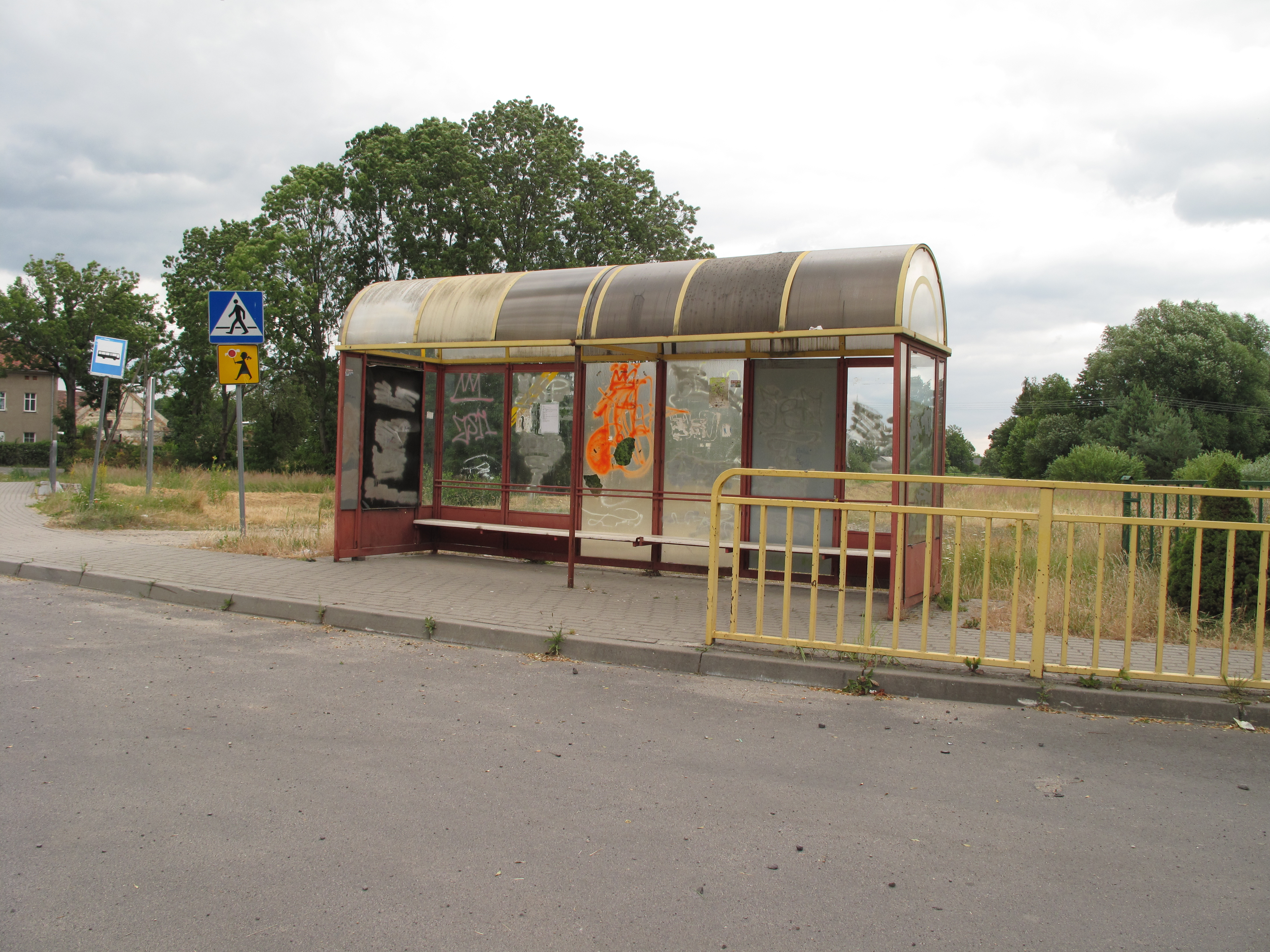
Bus stop shelter

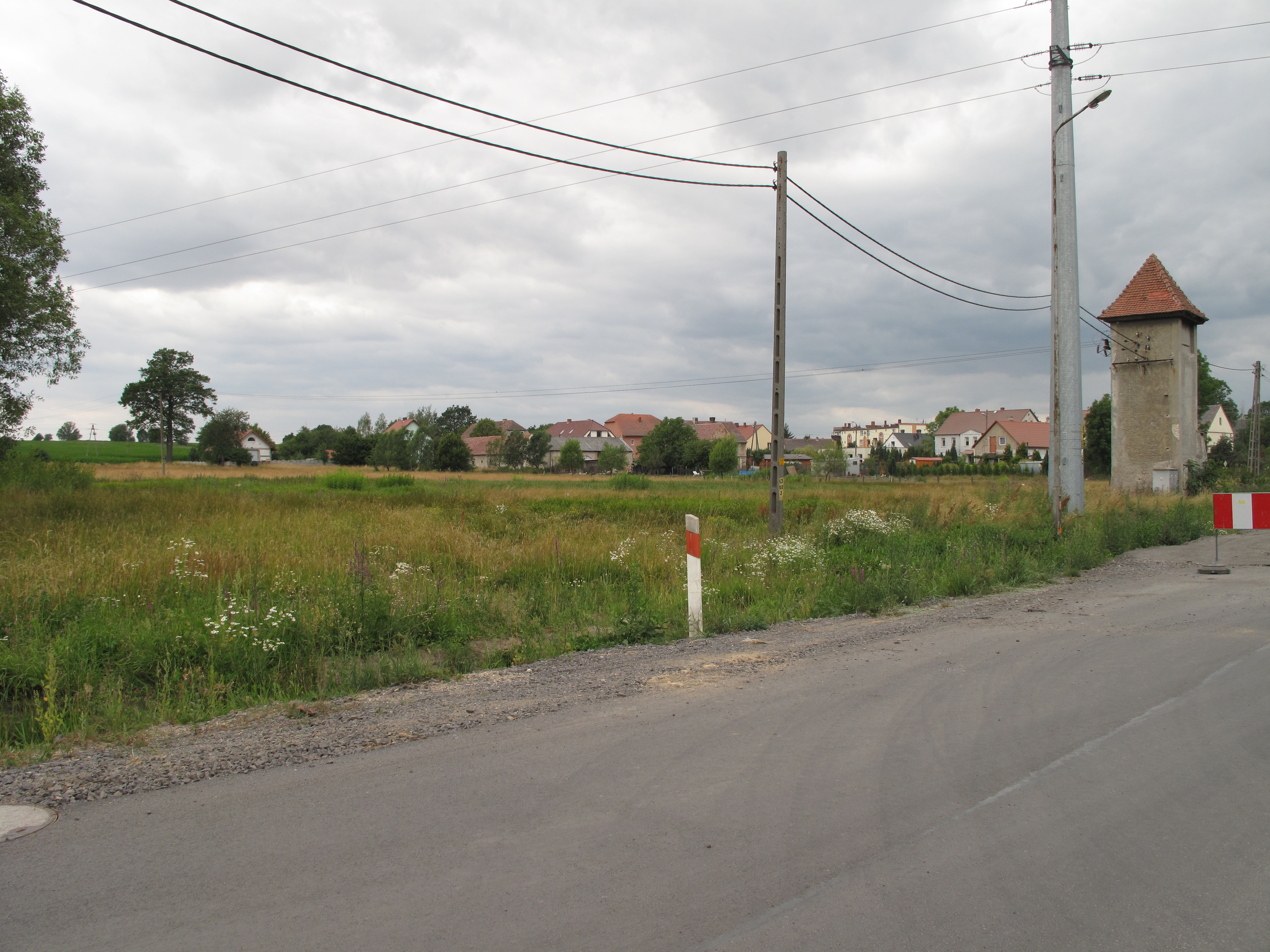
Houses from the road

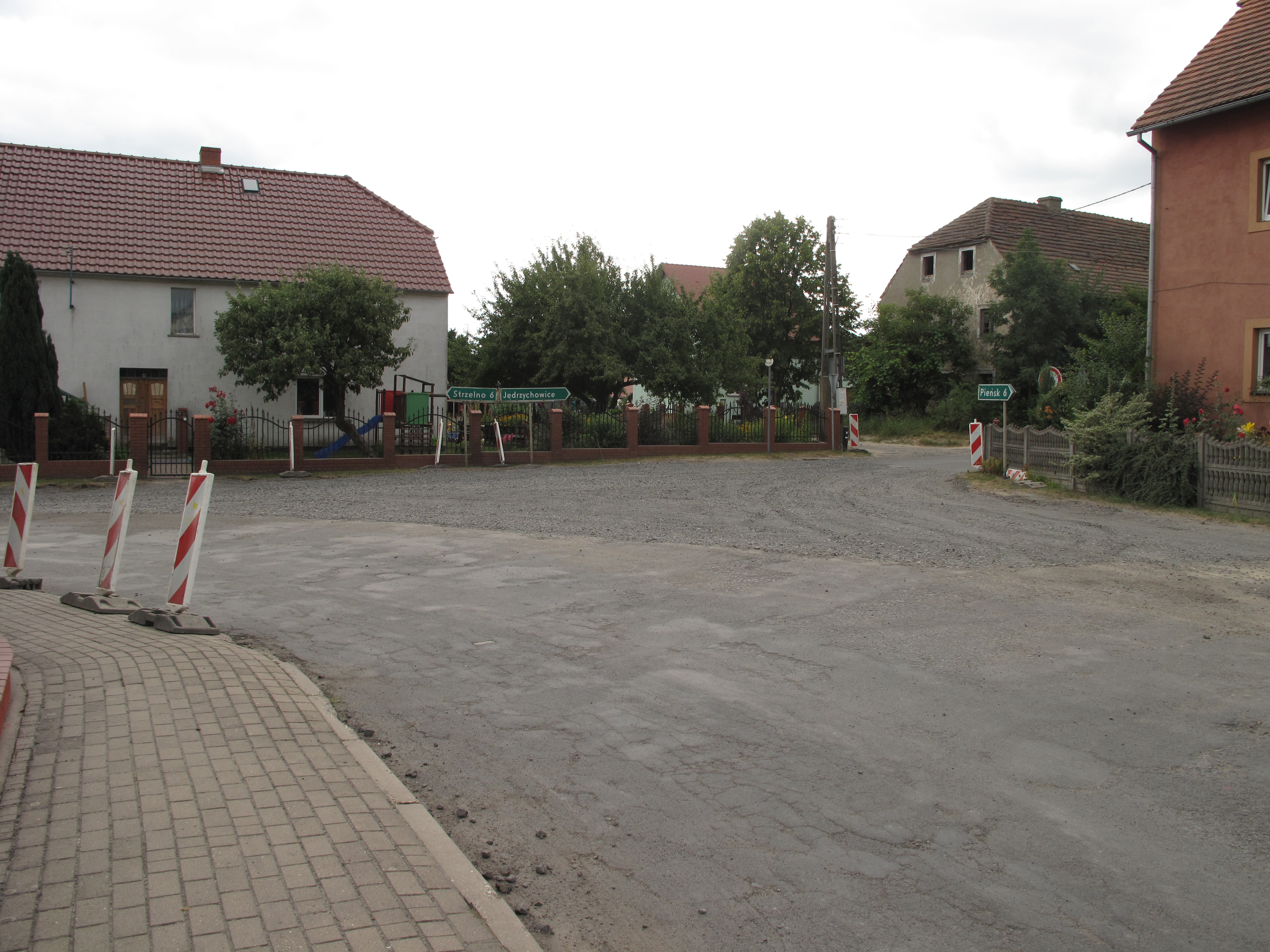
Crossroads
