= Żarki Średnie =

- Village
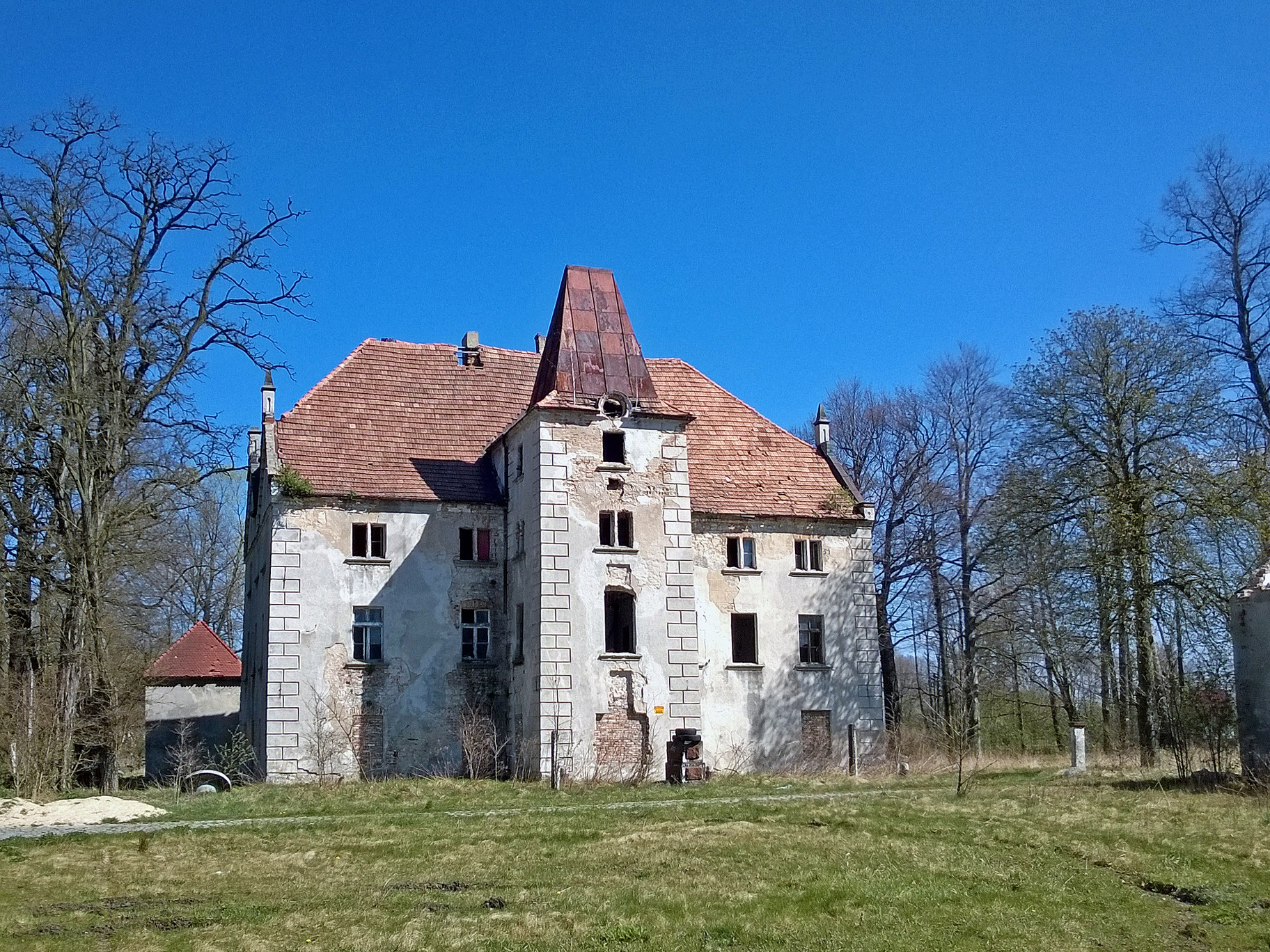
- Manor house

- Location within Poland
- Coordinates: 51°12′31″N 15°03′22″E
- Country: Poland
- Voivodeship: Lower Silesian
- County: Zgorzelec
- Gmina: Pieńsk
- Elevation: 195 m (640 ft)
- Population (approx.): 630

Żarki Średnie [ˈʐarki ˈɕrɛdɲɛ] (Upper Sorbian: Žarki Šědne) is a village in the administrative district of Gmina Pieńsk, within Zgorzelec County, Lower Silesian Voivodeship, in south-western Poland, close to the German border.
