= Heřmanice (Liberec District) =

- Municipality
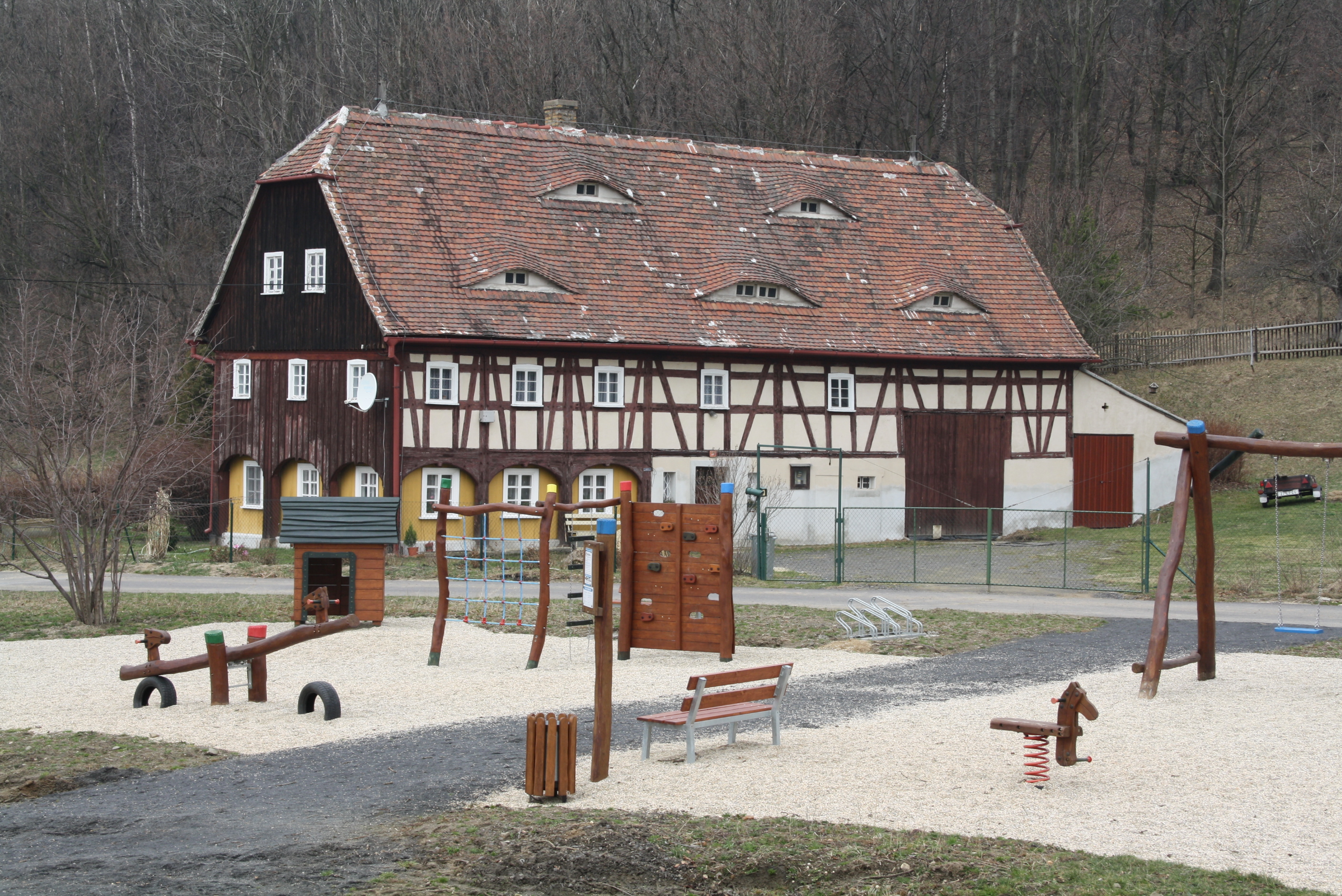
- House No. 77

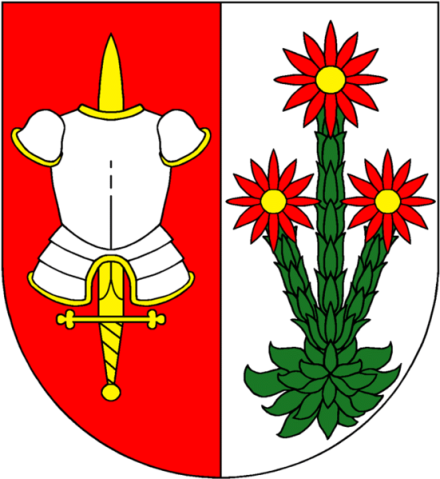
- Flag Coat of arms

- Location in the Czech Republic
- Coordinates: 50°53′49″N 15°0′23″E
- Country: Czech Republic
- Region: Liberec
- District: Liberec
- First mentioned: 1381

Area
  - Total: 7.47 km^{2} (2.88 sq mi)
- Elevation: 310 m (1,020 ft)

Population (2026-01-01)
  - Total: 286
  - Density: 38.3/km^{2} (99.2/sq mi)
- Time zone: UTC+1 (CET)
  - Summer (DST): UTC+2 (CEST)
- Postal code: 464 01
- Website: www.hermanice.com

Heřmanice (German: Hermsdorf) is a municipality and village in Liberec District in the Liberec Region of the Czech Republic. It has about 300 inhabitants.

== Etymology ==
The original German name of the village was Hermannsdorff, meaning "Herman's village". It was gradually distorted into Hermsdorf. The Czech name was created by translation.

== Geography ==
Heřmanice is located about 14 kilometres (9 mi) north of Liberec, in a salient region of Frýdlant Hook on the border with Poland. The northern part of the municipal territory with the built-up area lies in the Jizera Foothills. The southern part lies in the Jizera Mountains and includes the highest point of Heřmanice, the hill Lysý vrch at 643 m (2,110 ft) above sea level. The Oleška Stream flows through the municipality.

== History ==
The first written mention of Heřmanice is from 1381. There is an even older mention in the Zittau annals, but the date of 1375 is only an estimate. Heřmanice was then part of the Frýdlant estate, owned by the Biberstein family until 1544. The Schwanitz family held the village from 1544 to 1668. In 1678, Heřmanice was again joined to the Frýdlant estate and was owned by the Clam-Gallas family.

In 1900, a railway from Frýdlant to Zittau via Heřmanice was built. The railway was in service until 1976.

In 1938, the municipality was annexed by Nazi Germany and administered as part of Reichsgau Sudetenland. After the World War II, the German population was expelled and the number of inhabitants dropped.

In 1960, Heřmanice merged with the neighbouring municipality of Dětřichov. From 1986 to 1990, it was an administrative part of Frýdlant. Since 1 September 1990, it has been a separate municipality.

The village was hit by floods in summer 2010. The whole infrastructure of the village was destroyed. Many houses were damaged, several houses were demolished. One woman died.

== Demographics ==
Historical population

Year	Pop.	±%
1869	1,313	—
1880	1,323	+0.8%
1890	1,237	−6.5%
1900	1,308	+5.7%
1910	1,359	+3.9%

Year	Pop.	±%
1921	1,166	−14.2%
1930	1,129	−3.2%
1950	434	−61.6%
1961	371	−14.5%
1970	348	−6.2%

Year	Pop.	±%
1980	260	−25.3%
1991	182	−30.0%
2001	232	+27.5%
2011	213	−8.2%
2021	269	+26.3%

Source: Censuses

== Transport ==
On the Czech–Polish border is the Heřmanice / Bogatynia road border crossing.

== Sights ==
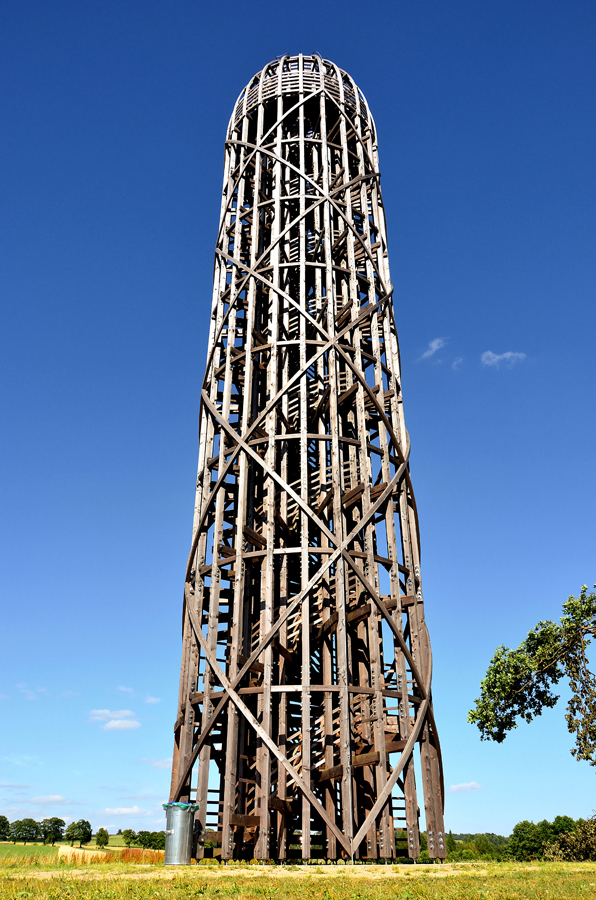
Observation tower

There are several half-timbered houses in Heřmanice, built in the so-called Upper Lusatian style.

A wooden observation tower was built in Heřmanice in 2012. It is 24 m (79 ft) high, has the shape of a tube topped by a dome, and 99 steps lead to the top.

== Twin towns – sister cities ==
Heřmanice is twinned with:

- Pieńsk, Poland
