= Stojanów, Lower Silesian Voivodeship =

Stojanów
- Village
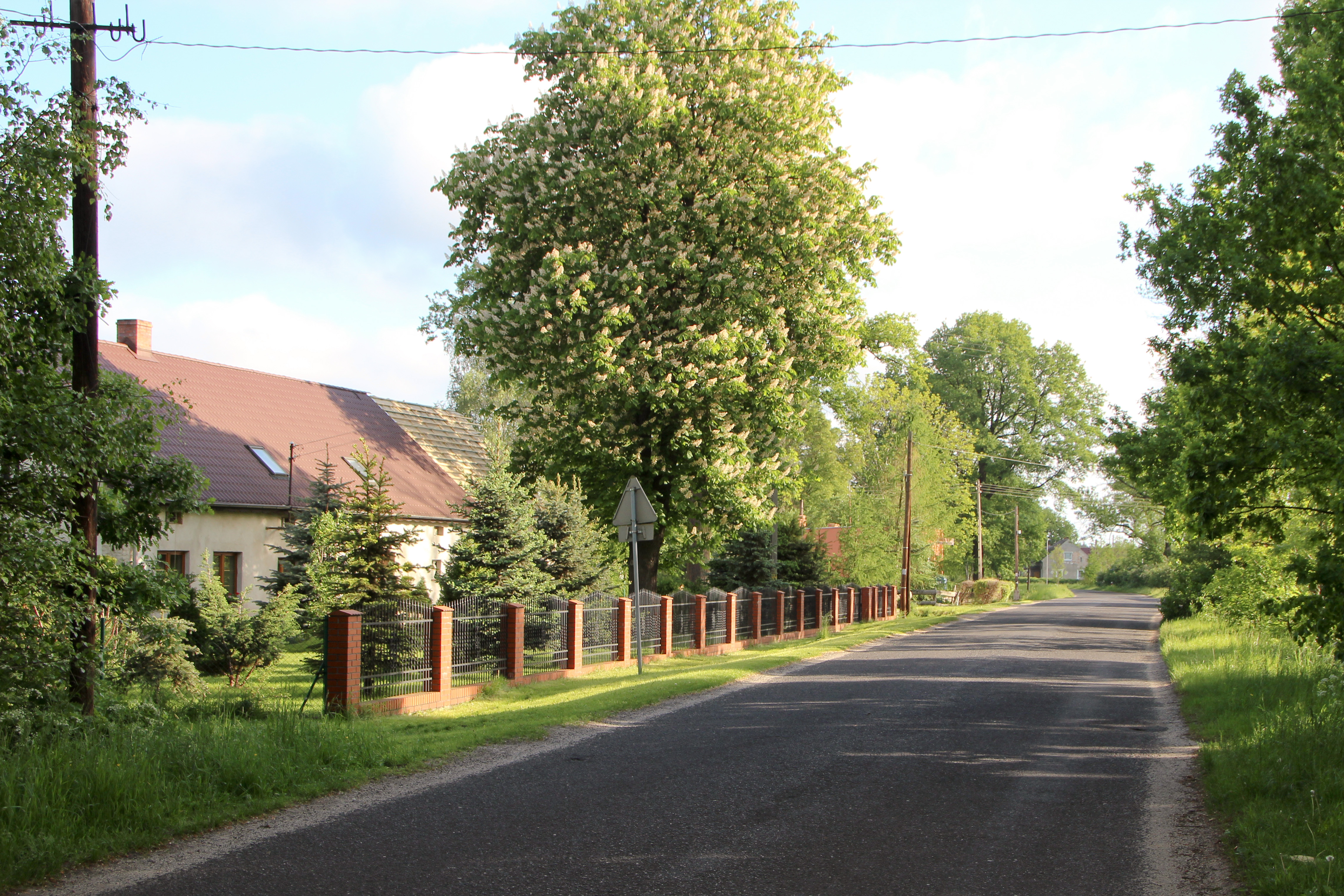
- Street in Stojanów

- Location within Poland
- Coordinates: 51°16′39.47″N 15°03′24.35″E
- Country: Poland
- Voivodeship: Lower Silesian
- County: Zgorzelec
- Gmina: Pieńsk
- Population: 242 (2,011)

Stojanów [stɔˈjanuf] (Upper Sorbian: Stoyaner) is a village in the administrative district of Gmina Pieńsk, within Zgorzelec County, Lower Silesian Voivodeship, in south-western Poland, close to the German border.
