= Gmina Pieńsk =

Gmina Pieńsk Pieńsk Commune
- Gmina
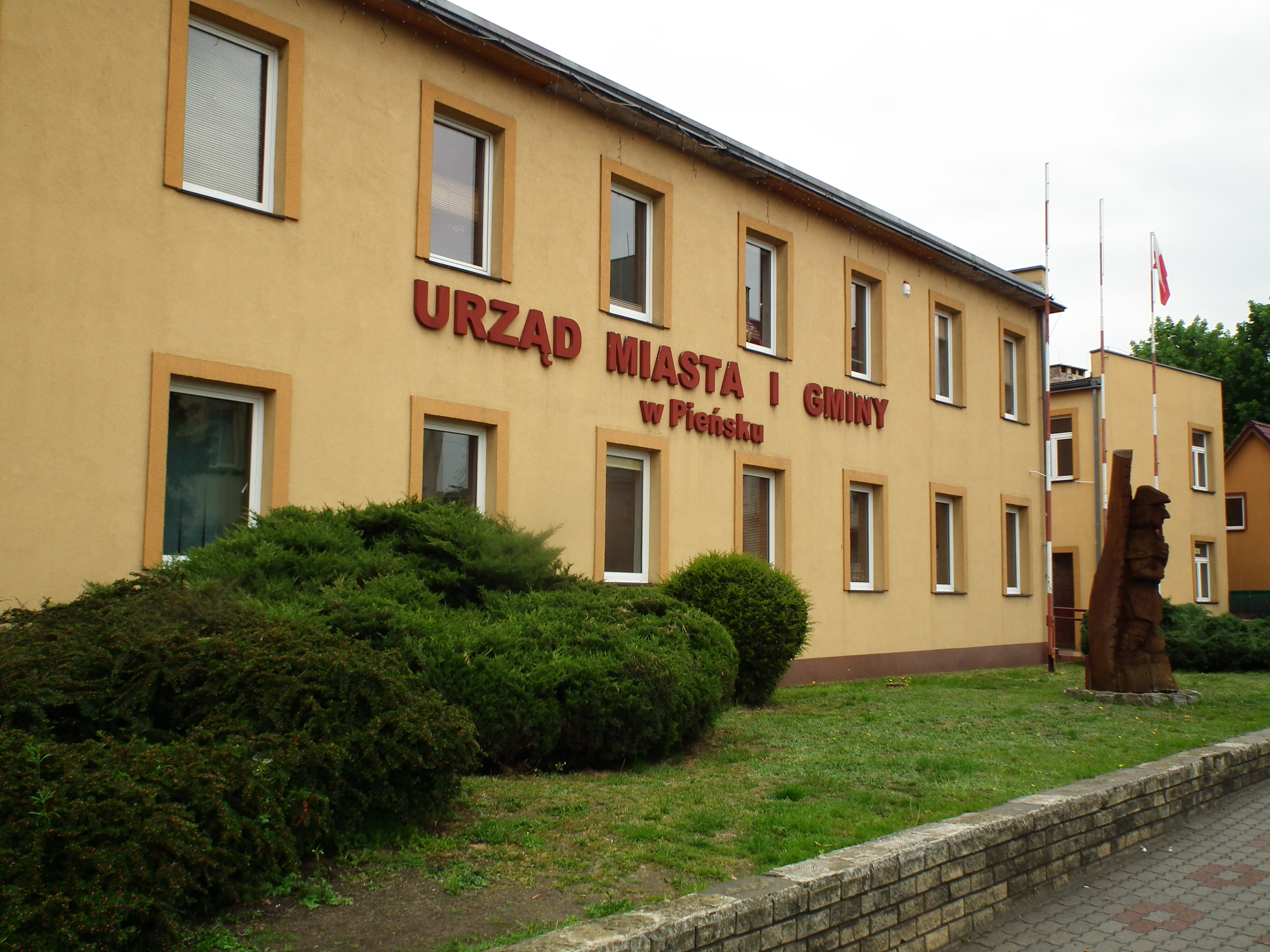
- Town hall

- Flag Coat of arms
- Interactive map of Gmina Pieńsk
- Coordinates (Pieńsk): 51°14′47″N 15°02′46″E
- Country: Poland
- Voivodeship: Lower Silesian
- County: Zgorzelec
- Seat: Pieńsk
- Sołectwos: Bielawa Dolna, Bielawa Górna, Dłużyna Dolna, Dłużyna Górna, Lasów, Stojanów, Żarka nad Nysą, Żarki Średnie

Area
  - Total: 110.33 km^{2} (42.60 sq mi)

Population (2019-06-30)
  - Total: 9,068
  - Density: 82.19/km^{2} (212.9/sq mi)
  - Urban: 5,828
  - Rural: 3,240
- Website: http://www.piensk.com.pl

Gmina Pieńsk is an urban-rural gmina (administrative district) in Zgorzelec County, Lower Silesian Voivodeship, in south-western Poland, on the German border. Its seat is the town of Pieńsk, which lies approximately 11 kilometres (7 mi) north of Zgorzelec, and 140 kilometres (87 mi) west of the regional capital Wrocław.

The gmina covers an area of 110.33 square kilometres (42.6 sq mi), and as of 2019 its total population is 9,068.

== Neighbouring gminas ==
Gmina Pieńsk is bordered by the gminas of Lubań, Nowogrodziec, Węgliniec and Zgorzelec. It also borders Germany.

== Villages ==
Apart from the town of Pieńsk, the gmina contains the villages of Bielawa Dolna, Bielawa Górna, Dłużyna Dolna, Dłużyna Górna, Lasów, Stojanów, Strzelno, Żarka nad Nysą, Żarki Średnie, and the abandoned village of Prędocice.

== Twin towns – sister cities ==
Gmina Pieńsk is twinned with:

- Heřmanice, Czech Republic
- Kunratice, Czech Republic
- Neißeaue, Germany
- Rietschen, Germany
- Rothenburg, Germany
- Schleife, Germany
