= Bielawa Górna =

- Village
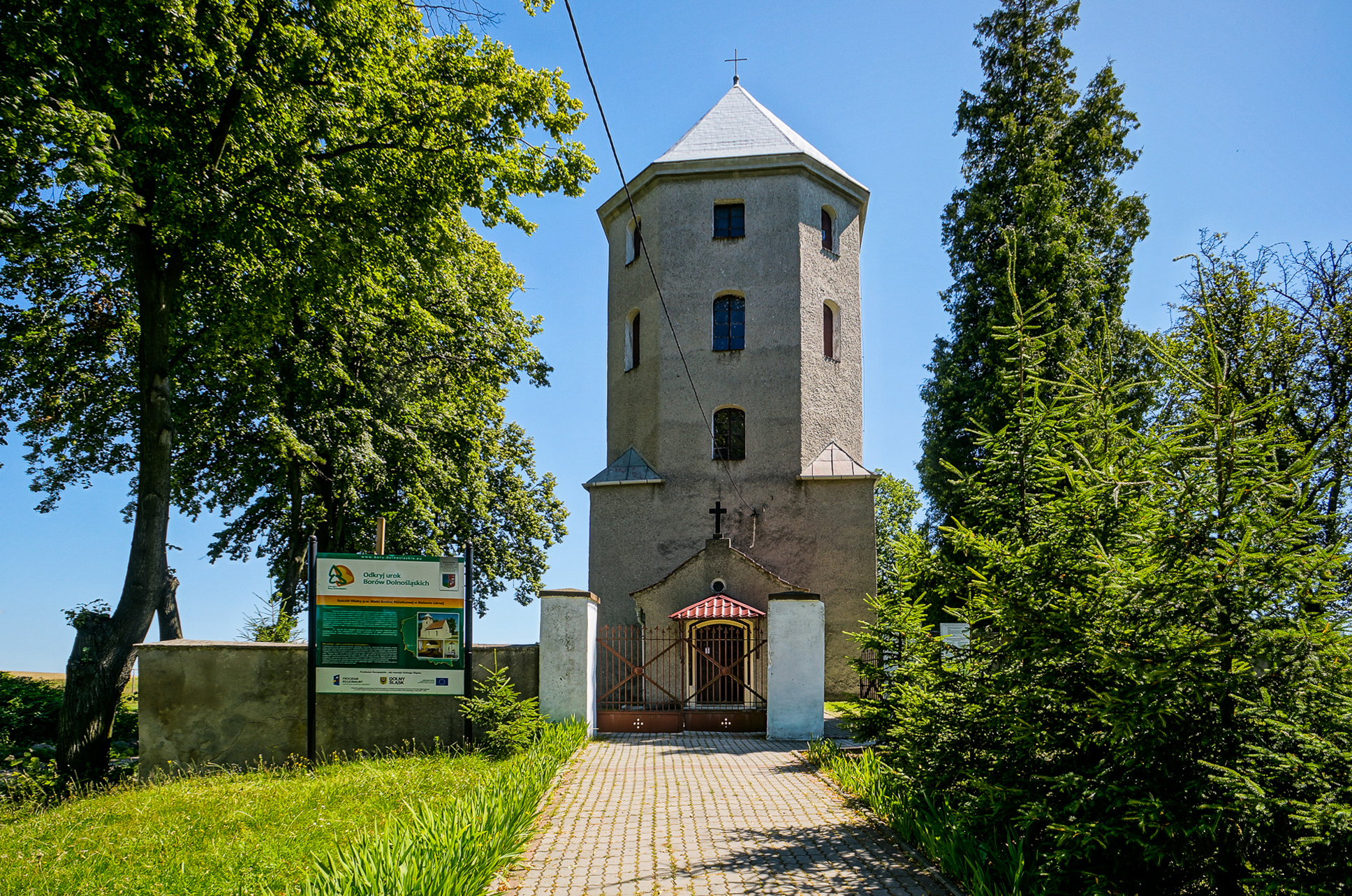

- Location within Poland
- Coordinates: 51°12′N 15°12′E
- Country: Poland
- Voivodeship: Lower Silesian
- County: Zgorzelec
- Gmina: Pieńsk

Bielawa Górna [bjɛˈlava ˈɡurna] (Upper Sorbian: Bjelawa Górna) is a village in the administrative district of Gmina Pieńsk, within Zgorzelec County, Lower Silesian Voivodeship, in south-western Poland, close to the German border.
