= Polish Air Defence Force =

The Polish Air Defence Force (Polish: Wojska Obrony Powietrznej Kraju (WOPK) for Troops for Air Defence of the Territory) - was one of the four branches of the Polish People's Army in the years 1962–1990, along with the Polish Land Forces, Polish Air Force and the Navy.

== History ==
The Air Defence Force was intended for the defence of the population, troops and economically and strategically important military and administrative-state facilities located on the territory of the country, against enemy air attack. Their organization was modeled on the Soviet Armed Forces, and they were included in the air defence system of the Warsaw Pact countries. OPK troops constituted an important element of the country's territorial defence forces, which also included units of land forces and the Navy.

The three Air Defence Corps were all established in 1957.

On July 1, 1990, the Air Defence Force and the Air Force merged into the Air Force and Air Defense Troops (Wojska Lotnicze i Obrony Powietrznej (WLiOP)). The unified armed service took over the 1st, 2nd and 3rd Air Defence Corps as well as the 4th Air Corps (4. Korpus Lotniczy, HQ in Poznań) established in the beginning of 1990 as a command of the Air Force's combat units of equal status to the 3 air defence corps. The 1st Air Defence Corps was disestablished in 1998, and the 2nd and 3rd Corps in 2007. Currently, after another reorganization and name change, the tasks of these troops are performed by Air Force units.

== Force structure in 1989 ==
Territorial Air Defence Troops Command (Dowództwo Wojsk Obrony Powietrznej Kraju), in Warsaw

- directly subordinated
  - Central Command Post of the WOPK (Centralne Stanowisko Dowodzenia WOPK), in Warsaw
  - WOPK Communications Node (Węzeł Łączności WOPK), in Warsaw
  - WOPK Supply Unit (Jednostka Zabezpieczenia WOPK), in Warsaw
  - 4th Air Base (4 Baza Lotnicza), at Warsaw - Babice (alternatively known as Warsaw - Bemowo)
  - 1st Regiment for Radioelectronic Intelligence "Capt. Władysław Pietrusiak" (1 Pułk Rozpoznania Radioelektronicznego im. kpt. Wł. Pietrusiaka (1 prrel)), in Ogrodzieniec near Grójec
    - 1st Battalion for Radioelectronic Intelligence (1 Batalion Rozpoznania Radioelektronicznego), in Dłużyna Górna near Zgorzelec
  - 3rd Regiment for Radioelectronic Jamming (3 Pułk Zakłóceń Radioelektronicznych (3 pzrel)), in Lidzbark Warmiński
  - 14th Battalion for Radioelectronic Intelligence (14 Batalion Rozpoznania Radioelektronicznego), in Słupsk
  - Higher Radiotechnical Officer School "Capt. Sylwester Bartosik" (Wyższa Oficerska Szkoła Radiotechniczna im. kpt. Sylwestra Bartosika), in Jelenia Góra
  - WOPK School for Training of Radiotechnical Specialists (Szkoła Specjalistów Wojsk Radiotechnicznych), in Chorzów
  - WOPK [missile air defence] Specialists Training Center "Wojciech Kętrzyński" (Centrum Szkolenia Specjalistów Wojsk OPK im. Wojciecha Kętrzyńskiego), in Bemowo Piskie
- 1st Air Defence Corps, in Warsaw
  - Command Post of the 1st ADC (SD 1 KOPK), in Warsaw
  - 42nd Liaison Air Squadron (42 el), in Warsaw Babice (Bemowo)
  - 1st WOPK "Warsaw" Fighter Air Regiment "Brig. Gen. Stefan Pawlikowski" (1. Pułk Lotnictwa Myśliwskiego "Warszawa" im. gen. bryg. pil. Stefana Pawlikowskiego (1 plm OPK)) - MiG-29/UB, MiG-21M/PFM/U, in Mińsk Mazowiecki Air Base
  - 10th WOPK Fighter Air Regiment "People's Partizans of the Krakow Lands" (10. Pułk Lotnictwa Myśliwskiego OPK im. Ludowych Partyzantów Ziemi Krakowskiej (10 plm OPK)) - MiG-21PFM/M/MF/UM, in Łask Air Base
  - 3rd WOPK [missile air defence] Łużycką Artillery Brigade ((3 BA OPK)), in Warsaw
    - 83rd Air Defence Command Battalion (83. Dywizjon Dowodzenia Obrony Powietrznej), in Warsaw Citadel
    - inner Warsaw defensive ring, initially S-75 Dvina, later upgraded to S-75M Volkhov:
      - 2nd Missile Air Defence Battalion (2. Dywizjon Rakietowy Obrony Powietrznej), near Czosnów
      - 3rd Missile Air Defence Battalion (3. Dywizjon Rakietowy Obrony Powietrznej), between Nadarzyn and Otrębusy near Pruszków
      - 4th Missile Air Defence Battalion (4. Dywizjon Rakietowy Obrony Powietrznej), in Baniocha near Góra Kalwaria
      - 5th Missile Air Defence Battalion (5. Dywizjon Rakietowy Obrony Powietrznej), in Słupno near Radzymin
      - 1st Technical Air Defence Battalion (1. Dywizjon Techniczny Obrony Powietrznej), in Książenice near Grodzisk Mazowiecki
    - outer Warsaw defensive ring S-75M Volkhov battalions:
      - 6th Missile Air Defence Battalion (6. Dywizjon Rakietowy Obrony Powietrznej), at Chrcynno airfield, Nasielsk near Nowy Dwór Mazowiecki
      - 7th Missile Air Defence Battalion (7. Dywizjon Rakietowy Obrony Powietrznej), in Pustelnik near Sulejówek
      - 8th Missile Air Defence Battalion (8. Dywizjon Rakietowy Obrony Powietrznej), in Lesznowola near Grójec
      - 9th Missile Air Defence Battalion (9. Dywizjon Rakietowy Obrony Powietrznej), in Teresin near Sochaczew
      - 10th Technical Air Defence Battalion (10. Dywizjon Techniczny Obrony Powietrznej), in Struga near Marki
    - S-125M Neva battalions:
      - 60th Missile Air Defence Battalion (60. Dywizjon Rakietowy Obrony Powietrznej), in Chotomów near Olszewnica Stara
      - 61st Missile Air Defence Battalion (61. Dywizjon Rakietowy Obrony Powietrznej), in Małocice near Czosnów
      - 62nd Missile Air Defence Battalion (62. Dywizjon Rakietowy Obrony Powietrznej), between Borzęcin Duży and Mariew near Stare Babice
      - 63rd Missile Air Defence Battalion (63. Dywizjon Rakietowy Obrony Powietrznej), between Nadarzyn and Rusiec near Pruszków
  - 1st WOPK Radiotechnical Brigade (1. Brygada Radiotechniczna), in Warsaw-Babice
    - 3rd Sandomierski Radiotechnical Battalion (3. Sandomierski Batalion Radiotechniczny), in Sandomierz
    - 4th Radiotechnical Battalion (4. Batalion Radiotechniczny), in Radiowo
    - 7th Łaski Radiotechnical Battalion (7. Łaski Batalion Radiotechniczny), in Wiewiórczyn
    - 8th Szczycieński Radiotechnical Battalion (8. Szczycieński Batalion Radiotechniczny), in Lipowiec
- 2nd Air Defence Corps, in Bydgoszcz
  - Command Post of the 1st ADC (SD 1 KOPK), in Bydgoszcz
  - 43rd Liaison Air Squadron (43 el), in Bydgoszcz
  - 26th WOPK Fighter Air Regiment ((26 plm OPK)), in Zegrze Pomorskie Air Base (disbanded in 1989)
  - 28th WOPK Słupski Fighter Air Regiment (28. Słupski Pułk Lotnictwa Myśliwskiego (28 plm OPK)) - MiG-23MF/UB, in Słupsk
  - 34th WOPK Fighter Air Regiment "Heroes of Kępa Oksywska" (34 Pułk Lotnictwa Myśliwskiego OPK im. Bohaterów Kępy Oksywskiej (34 plm OPK)) - MiG-21bis/UM, Gdynia-Babie Doły Air Base
  - 19th WOPK Target-Towing Air Squadron (19 LEH), in Słupsk - Yak-40
  - 4th WOPK [missile air defence] Artillery Brigade "Defenders of the Coast" (4 Brygada Artylerii Obrony Powietrznej Kraju im. Obrońców Wybrzeża (4 BA OPK)), in Gdynia
    - 84th Air Defence Command Battalion (84. Dywizjon Dowodzenia Obrony Powietrznej), in Gdynia-Grabówek
    - Gdynia and Gdańsk defensive ring missile battalions armed with S-75M Volkhov:
      - 21st Missile Air Defence Battalion (21. Dywizjon Rakietowy Obrony Powietrznej), in Puck
      - 22nd Missile Air Defence Battalion (22. Dywizjon Rakietowy Obrony Powietrznej), in Hel on Hel Peninsula
      - 23rd Missile Air Defence Battalion (23. Dywizjon Rakietowy Obrony Powietrznej), in Wyspa Sobieszewska near Gdańsk
      - 24th Missile Air Defence Battalion (24. Dywizjon Rakietowy Obrony Powietrznej), in Babi Dół near Kartuz
      - 25th Missile Air Defence Battalion (25. Dywizjon Rakietowy Obrony Powietrznej), in Dąbrówka near Luzino
      - 26th Technical Air Defence Battalion (26. Dywizjon Techniczny Obrony Powietrznej), in Bieszkowice near Wejherowo
    - defensive line along the Baltic coast:
      - S-75M Wołchow:
      - 44th Missile Air Defence Battalion (44. Dywizjon Rakietowy Obrony Powietrznej), in Ustka
      - 45th Missile Air Defence Battalion (45. Dywizjon Rakietowy Obrony Powietrznej), in Smołdzinie
      - 46th Missile Air Defence Battalion (46. Dywizjon Rakietowy Obrony Powietrznej), in Choczewo near Wejherowo
      - S-125M Neva:
      - 64th Missile Air Defence Battalion (64. Dywizjon Rakietowy Obrony Powietrznej), in Hel Bór on the Hel Peninsula
      - 65th Missile Air Defence Battalion (65. Dywizjon Rakietowy Obrony Powietrznej), in Rozewie near Władysławowo
      - 68th Missile Air Defence Battalion (68. Dywizjon Rakietowy Obrony Powietrznej), in Łeba near Lębork
      - 69th Missile Air Defence Battalion (69. Dywizjon Rakietowy Obrony Powietrznej), in Rowy near Ustka
  - 26th WOPK [missile air defence] Artillery Brigade (26 BA OPK), in Gryfice
    - 82nd Air Defence Command Battalion (82. Dywizjon Dowodzenia Obrony Powietrznej), in Gryfice
    - Szczecin defensive ring missile battalions armed with S-75M Volkhov:
      - 36th Missile Air Defence Battalion (36. Dywizjon Rakietowy Obrony Powietrznej), in Dobra (Szczecińska) near Police
      - 37th Missile Air Defence Battalion (37. Dywizjon Rakietowy Obrony Powietrznej), in Glicko near Nowogard
      - 38th Missile Air Defence Battalion (38. Dywizjon Rakietowy Obrony Powietrznej), in Bielkowo near Stargard Szczeciński
      - 39th Missile Air Defence Battalion (39. Dywizjon Rakietowy Obrony Powietrznej), in Czarnówko near Gryfino
    - defensive line along the Baltic coast:
      - missile battalions armed with S-75M Volkhov:
      - 40th Missile Air Defence Battalion (40. Dywizjon Rakietowy Obrony Powietrznej), in Kołczewo
      - 42nd Missile Air Defence Battalion (42. Dywizjon Rakietowy Obrony Powietrznej), in Ustronie Morskie
      - 43rd Missile Air Defence Battalion (43. Dywizjon Rakietowy Obrony Powietrznej), in Dąbki near Darłowo Naval Air Base
      - missile battalions armed with S-125M Neva:
      - 41st Missile Air Defence Battalion (41. Dywizjon Rakietowy Obrony Powietrznej), in Mrzeżyno
      - 66th Missile Air Defence Battalion (66. Dywizjon Rakietowy Obrony Powietrznej), in Wicko Morskie near Słupsk Air Base
      - 67th Missile Air Defence Battalion (67. Dywizjon Rakietowy Obrony Powietrznej), in Unieście near Koszalin
      - 70th Missile Air Defence Battalion (70. Dywizjon Rakietowy Obrony Powietrznej), in Łunowo near Świnoujście
      - 71st Missile Air Defence Battalion (71. Dywizjon Rakietowy Obrony Powietrznej), in Pobierowo near Gryfice
    - 78th WOPK 78th Missile Air Defence Regiment (78. Pułk Rakietowy Obrony Powietrznej OPK), in Mrzeżyno - S-200 missile system (subordinated to 26th Brigade)
      - Command Battalion (dywizjon dowodzenia)
      - 1st Firing Battalion (1. dywizjon ogniowy)
      - 2nd Firing Battalion (2. dywizjon ogniowy)
      - Technical Battalion (dywizjon techniczny)
  - 2nd WOPK Radiotechnical Brigade (2. Brygada Radiotechniczna), in Bydgoszcz
    - 21st Radiotechnical Battalion (21. Battalion Radiotechniczny), in Władysławowo
    - 22nd Radiotechnical Battalion (22. Battalion Radiotechniczny), in Chojnice
    - 23rd Radiotechnical Battalion (23. Battalion Radiotechniczny), in Słupsk
    - 27th Radiotechnical Battalion (27. Battalion Radiotechniczny), in Witkowo Pyrzyckie
    - 28th Radiotechnical Battalion (28. Battalion Radiotechniczny), in Gryfice
    - 11th Radiotechnical Company (11. Kompnia Radiotechniczna), in Chruściel
- 3rd Air Defence Corps (3. Korpus Obrony Powietrznej) in Wrocław
  - Command Post of the 1st ADC (SD 1 KOPK), in Wrocław
  - 44th Liaison Air Squadron (44 el), in Wrocław - Strachowice Air Base
  - 11th WOPK Brandenburski Fighter Air Regiment "Lower Silesian Settlers" (11 Brandenburski Pułk Lotnictwa Myśliwskiego OPK im. Osadników Ziemi Dolnośląskiej (11 plm OPK)) - MiG-21MF/UM, in Wrocław - Strachowice Air Base
  - 39th WOPK Fighter Air Regiment (39 plm OPK), in Mierzęcice (disbanded in 1987)
  - 62nd WOPK Fighter Air Regiment "Greater Poland Revolutionaries" (62 Pułk Lotnictwa Myśliwskiego OPK im. Powstańców Wielkopolskich (62 plm OPK)) - MiG-21 PFM/MF/US, in Poznań-Krzesiny Air Base
  - 1st WOPK [missile air defence] Artillery Brigade "Silesian Revolutionaries" (1 Brygadę Artylerii Obrony Powietrznej Kraju im. Powstańców Śląskich (1 BA OPK)), in Bytom
    - 81st Air Defence Command Battalion (81. Dywizjon Dowodzenia Obrony Powietrznej), in Bytom
    - group located northwest of Gliwice (armed with S-75M Volkhov):
      - 11th Missile Air Defence Battalion (11. Dywizjon Rakietowy Obrony Powietrznej), in Kuźnia Raciborska (disbanded in 1990)
      - 12th Missile Air Defence Battalion (12. Dywizjon Rakietowy Obrony Powietrznej), in Zimna Wódka near Strzelce Opolskie
      - 13th Missile Air Defence Battalion (13. Dywizjon Rakietowy Obrony Powietrznej), in Lubliniec
      - 14th Missile Air Defence Battalion (14. Dywizjon Rakietowy Obrony Powietrznej), in Woźniki Śląskie
      - 19th Technical Battalion (19. Dywizjon Techniczny Obrony Powietrznej), in Toszek near Gliwice
    - group located southeast of Katowice (armed with S-75M Volkhov):
      - 15th Missile Air Defence Battalion (15. Dywizjon Rakietowy Obrony Powietrznej), in Ciągowice near Zawiercie
      - 16th Missile Air Defence Battalion (16. Dywizjon Rakietowy Obrony Powietrznej), in Bukowno (disbanded in 1989)
      - 17th Missile Air Defence Battalion (17. Dywizjon Rakietowy Obrony Powietrznej), in Libiąż lub Chełmek near Oświęcim
      - 18th Missile Air Defence Battalion (18. Dywizjon Rakietowy Obrony Powietrznej), in Kobiór near Pszczyna (disbanded in 1989)
      - 20th Technical Battalion (20. Dywizjon Techniczny Obrony Powietrznej), in Hutki near Olkusz
    - group of S-125M Neva battalions located southwest of Gliwice and Katowice:
      - 72nd Missile Air Defence Battalion (72. Dywizjon Rakietowy Obrony Powietrznej), in Lędziny near Oświęcim
      - 73rd Missile Air Defence Battalion (73. Dywizjon Rakietowy Obrony Powietrznej), in Bujaków near Oświęcim
      - 74th Missile Air Defence Battalion (74. Dywizjon Rakietowy Obrony Powietrznej), in Ostropa near Gliwice
      - 75th Missile Air Defence Battalion (75. Dywizjon Rakietowy Obrony Powietrznej), in Przezchlebie near Gliwice
  - 79th WOPK Separate Missile Air Defence Regiment (79. samodzielny Pułk Rakietowy Obrony Powietrznej OPK), in Poznań
    - S-75M Volkhov battalions:
      - 28th Missile Air Defence Battalion (28. Dywizjon Rakietowy Obrony Powietrznej), in Trzcielin near Stęszew
      - 29th Missile Air Defence Battalion (29. Dywizjon Rakietowy Obrony Powietrznej), in Nieczajna near Oborniki
      - 30th Missile Air Defence Battalion (30. Dywizjon Rakietowy Obrony Powietrznej), in Trzaskowo near Murowana Goślina
      - 31st Kórnicki Missile Air Defence Battalion (31. Kórnicki Dywizjon Rakietowy Obrony Powietrznej), in Czołowo near Kórnik
      - 32nd Technical Battalion (32. Dywizjon Techniczny), in Biedrusko near Poznań
    - S-125(M) Neva battalions:
      - 76th Missile Air Defence Battalion (76. Dywizjon Rakietowy Obrony Powietrznej), in Chomęcice
      - 77th Missile Air Defence Battalion (77. Dywizjon Rakietowy Obrony Powietrznej), in Złotkowo
  - 3rd WOPK Radiotechnical Brigade (3. Brygada Radiotechniczna), in Wrocław
    - 31st Radiotechnical Battalion (31. Batalion Radiotechniczny), in Poznań-Babki
    - 32nd Radiotechnical Battalion (32. Batalion Radiotechniczny), in Szczawno
    - 33rd Radiotechnical Battalion (33. Batalion Radiotechniczny), in Radzionków
    - 35th Radiotechnical Battalion (35. Batalion Radiotechniczny), in Pietrzykowice
    - 36th Radiotechnical Battalion (36. Batalion Radiotechniczny), in Kraków-Węgrzce

== Air defense systems ==
Model	Image	Origin	Type	Quantity	Details
S-75		Soviet Union	Fixed SAM System	300	NATO reporting name: SA-2 Guideline.
S-125		Soviet Union	Fixed SAM System	300	NATO reporting name: SA-3 Goa.
S-200		Soviet Union	Fixed SAM System	300	NATO reporting name: SA-5 Gammon.
