= Dłużyna Górna =

- Village
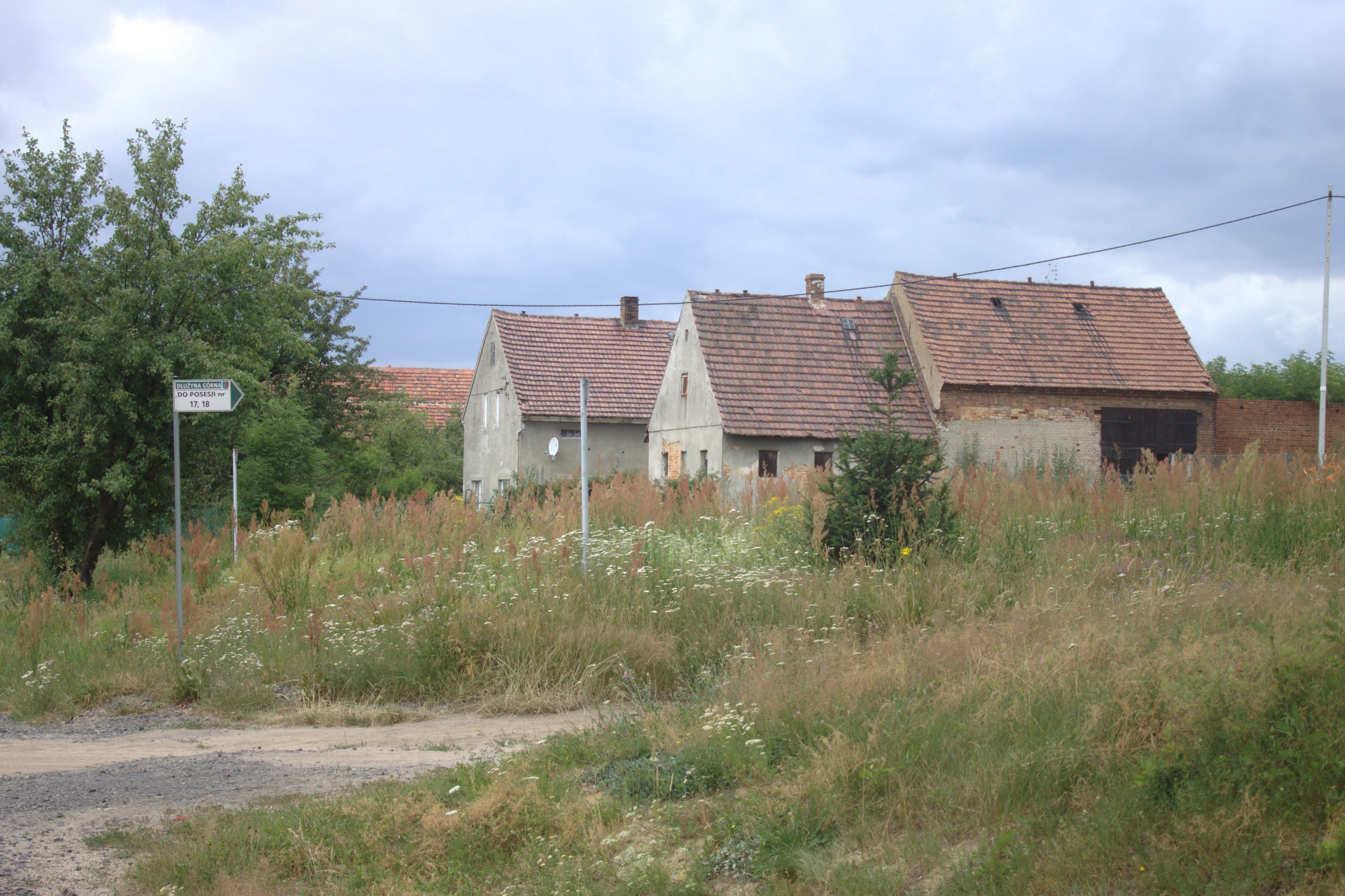
- Houses

- Location within Poland
- Coordinates: 51°14′N 15°9′E
- Country: Poland
- Voivodeship: Lower Silesian
- County: Zgorzelec
- Gmina: Pieńsk
- Population (approx.): 400
- Time zone: UTC+1 (CET)
  - Summer (DST): UTC+2 (CEST)
- Vehicle registration: DZG

Dłużyna Górna [dwuˈʐɨna ˈɡurna] is a village in the administrative district of Gmina Pieńsk, within Zgorzelec County, Lower Silesian Voivodeship, in south-western Poland, close to the German border.

== Gallery ==
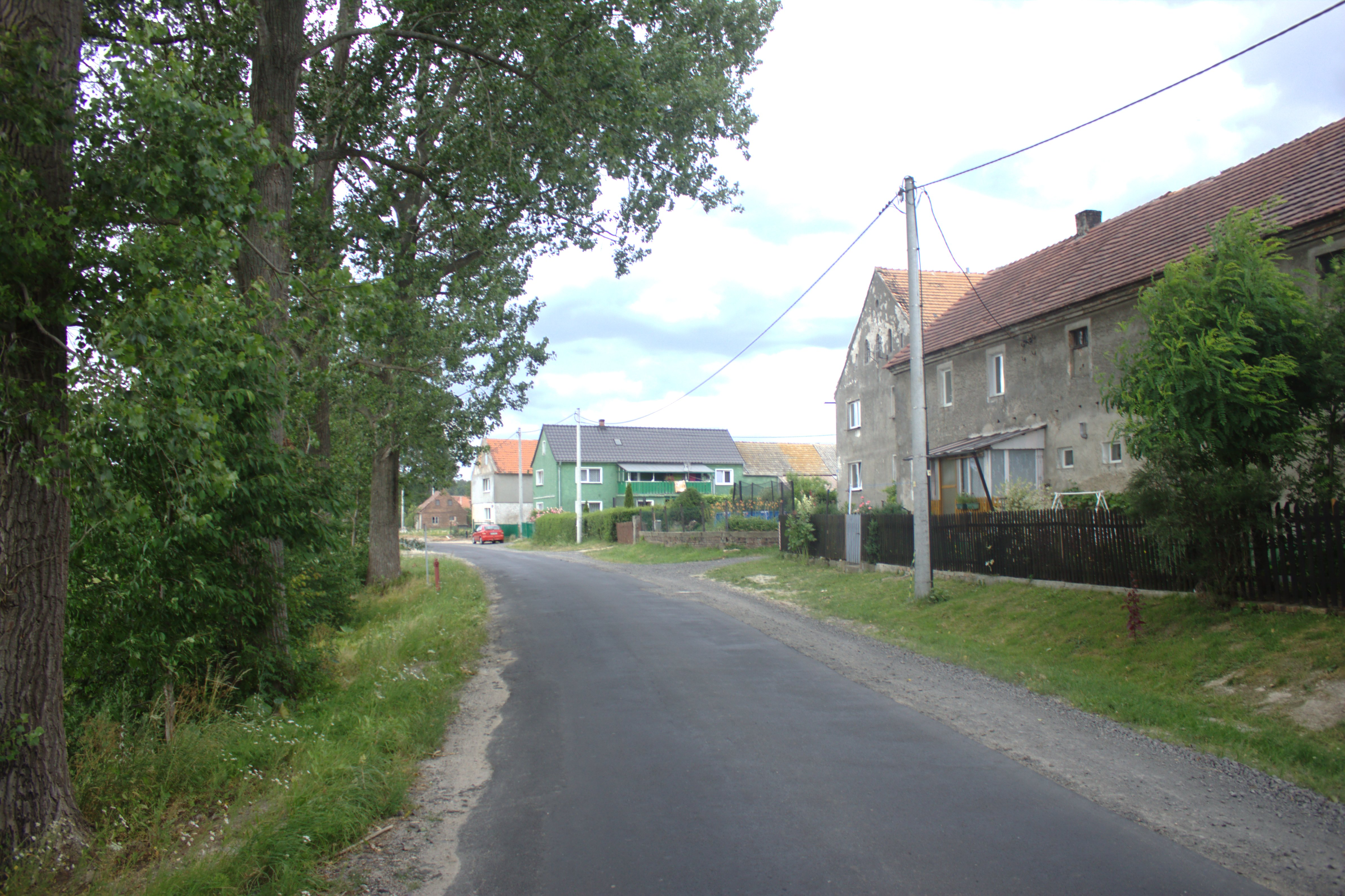
Street with houses

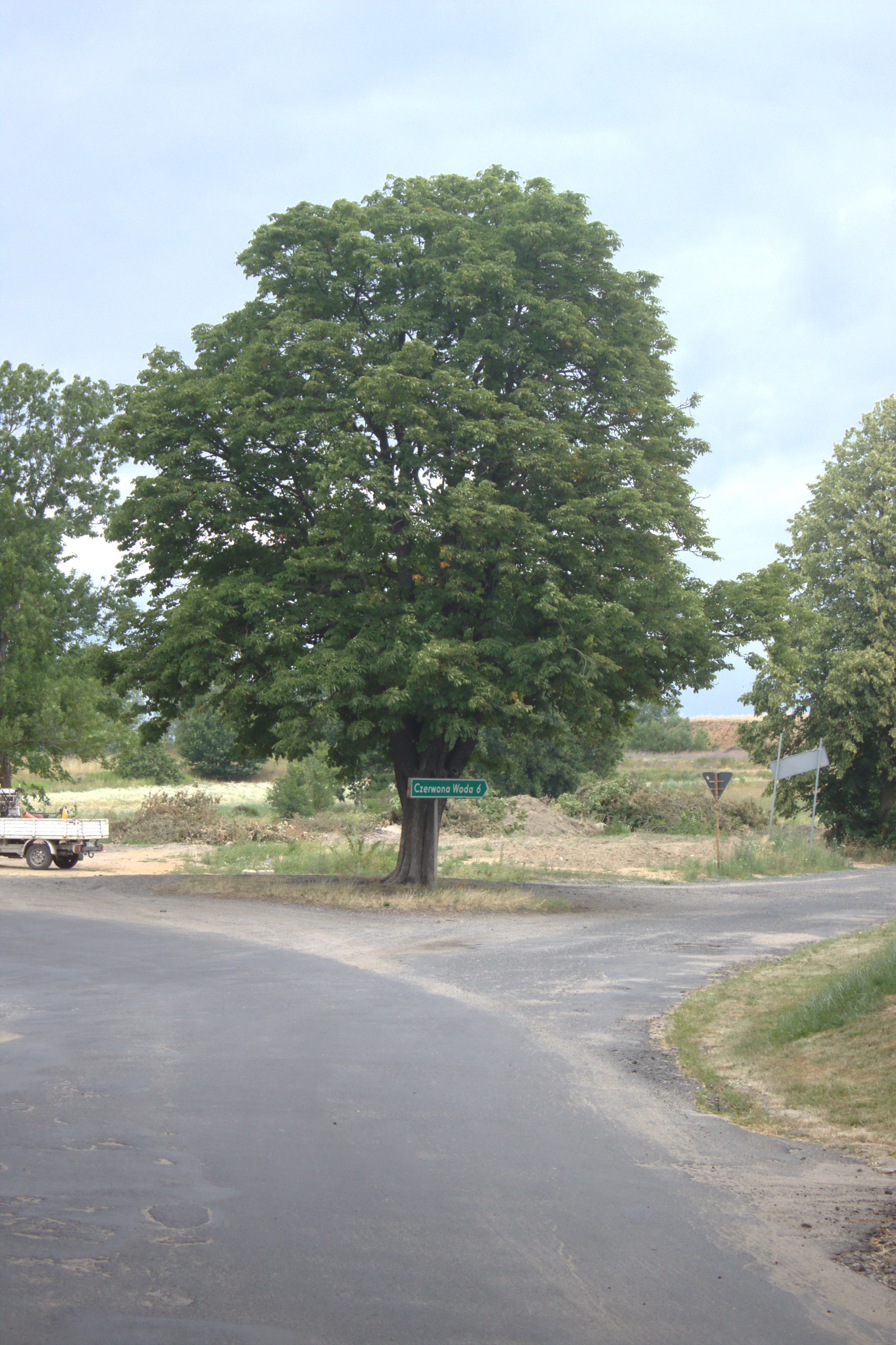
Crossroads

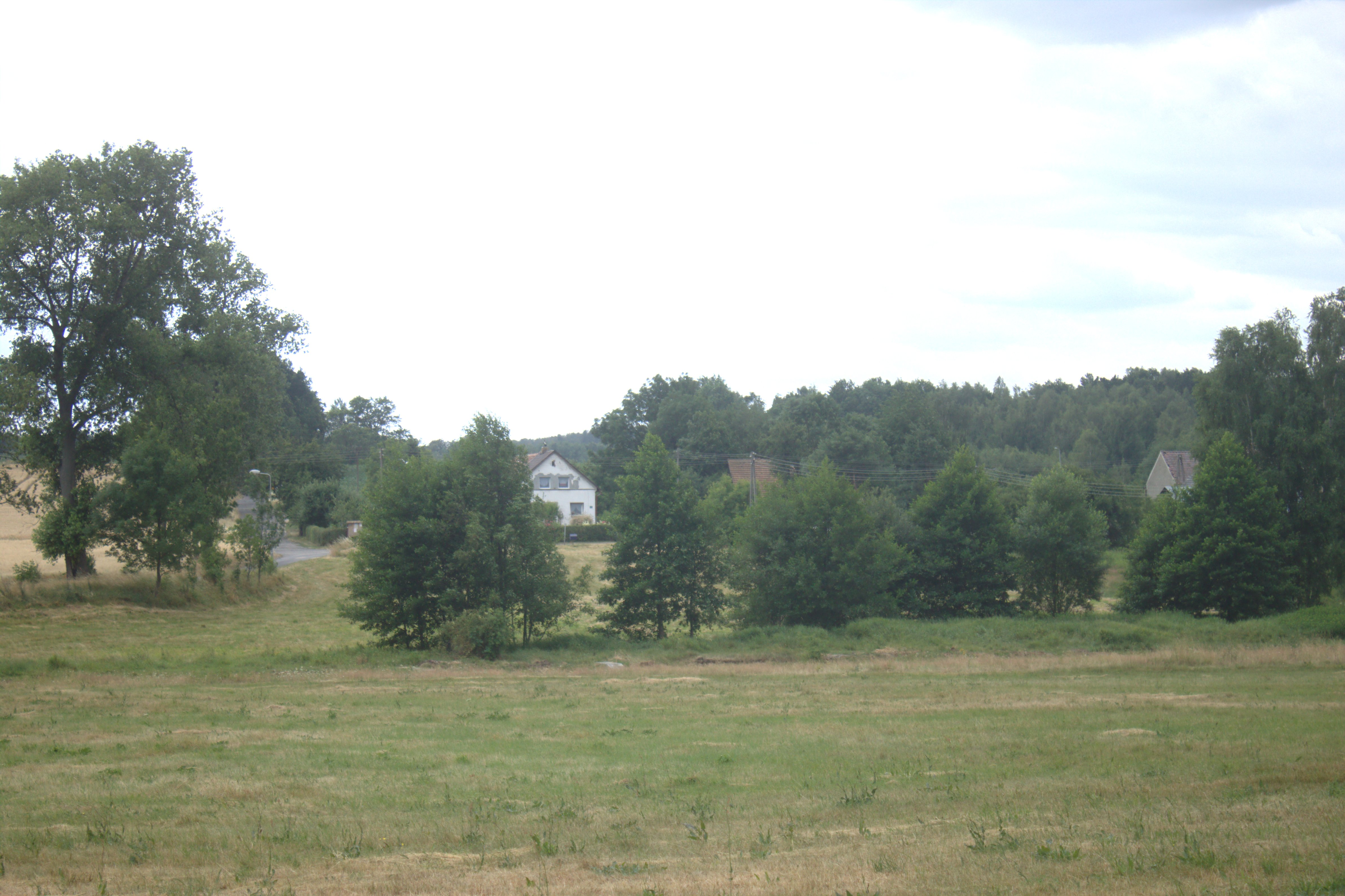
Nature in the village
