= Strzelno, Lower Silesian Voivodeship =

Strzelno
- Village
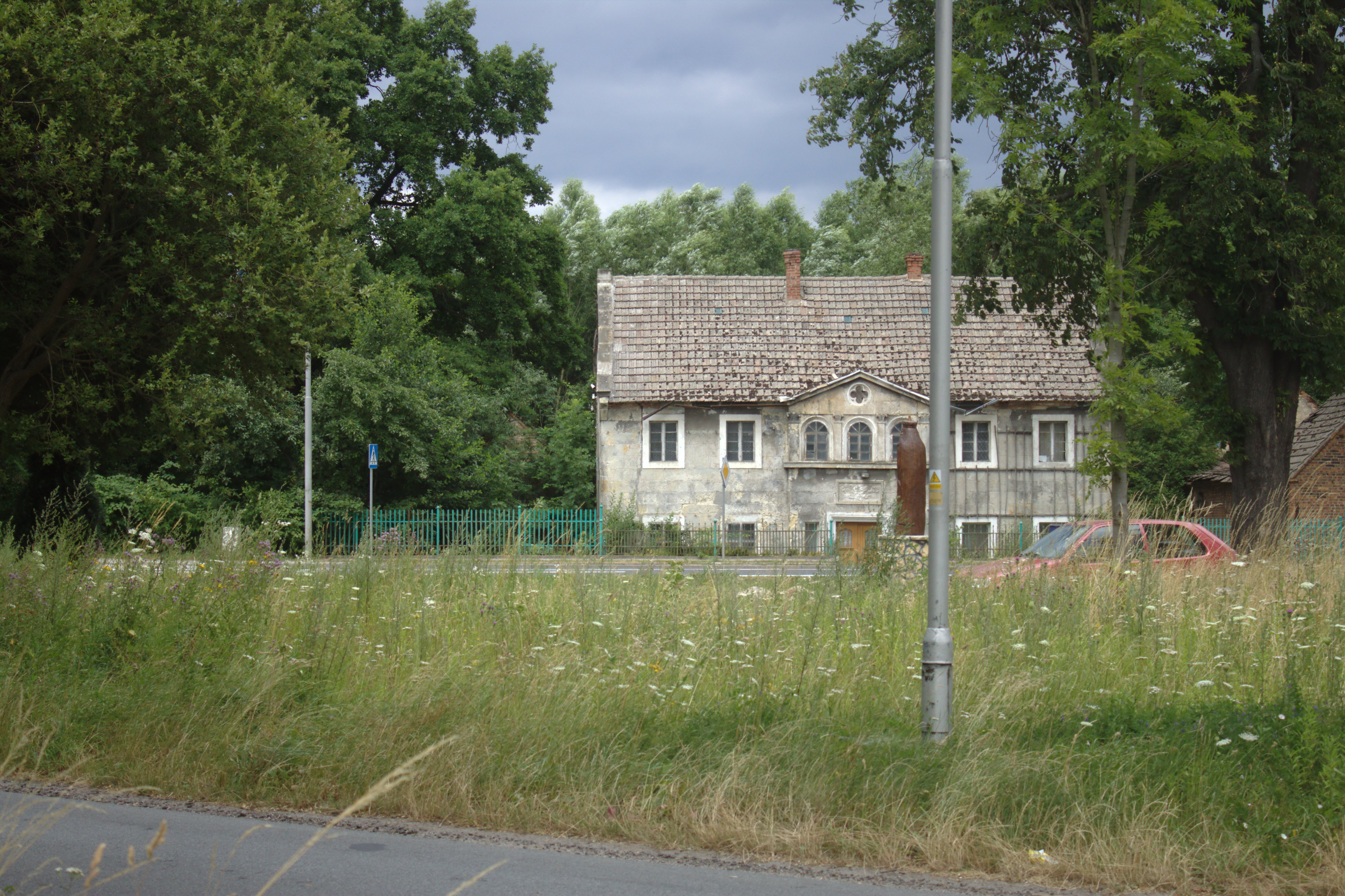
- A house

- Location within Poland
- Coordinates: 51°13′N 15°11′E
- Country: Poland
- Voivodeship: Lower Silesian
- County: Zgorzelec
- Gmina: Pieńsk

Strzelno ([ˈstʂɛlnɔ]; German: Schützenhain) is a village in the administrative district of Gmina Pieńsk, within Zgorzelec County, Lower Silesian Voivodeship, in south-western Poland, close to the German border.

== Gallery ==
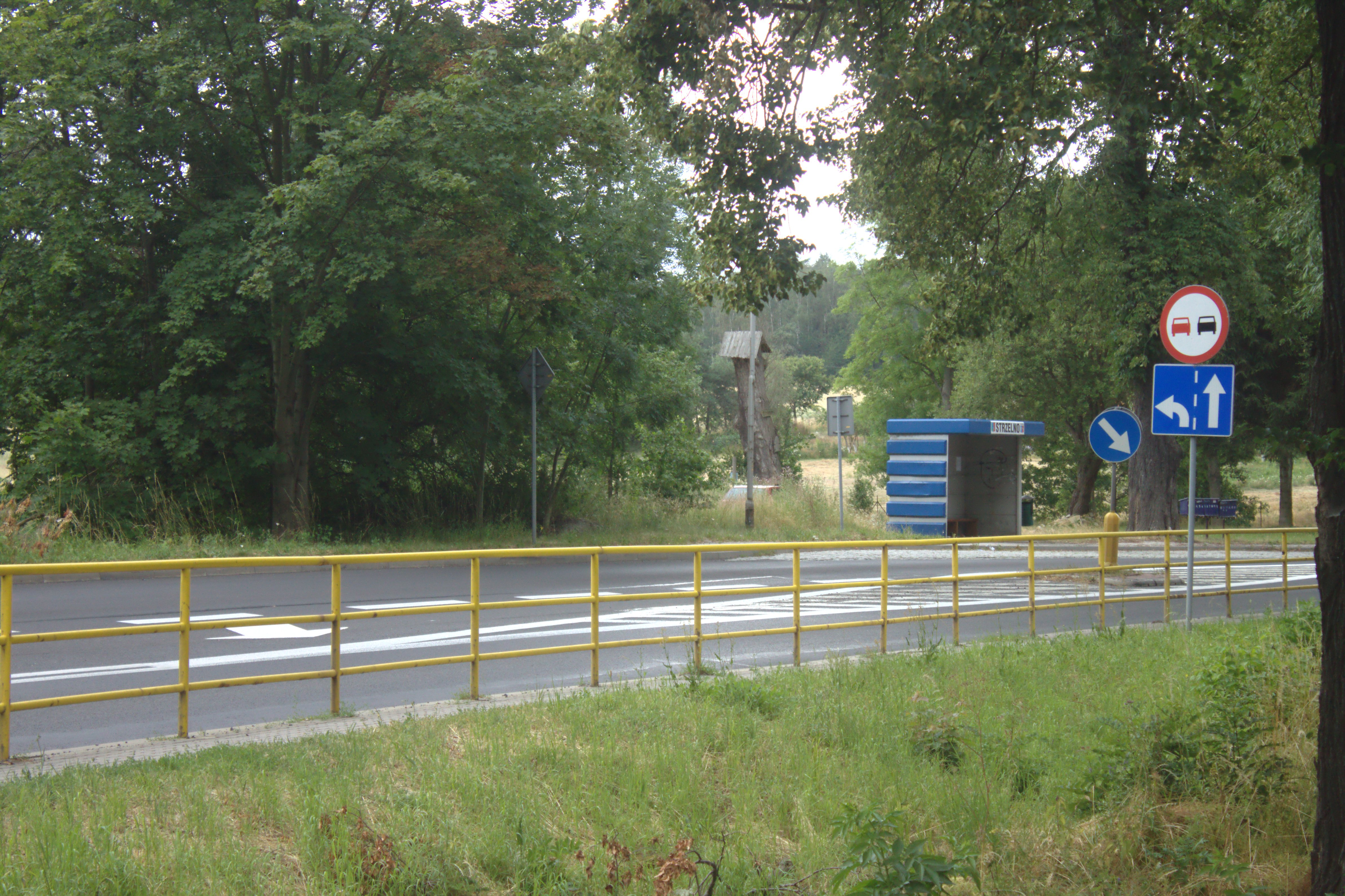
Road with a bus stop shelter

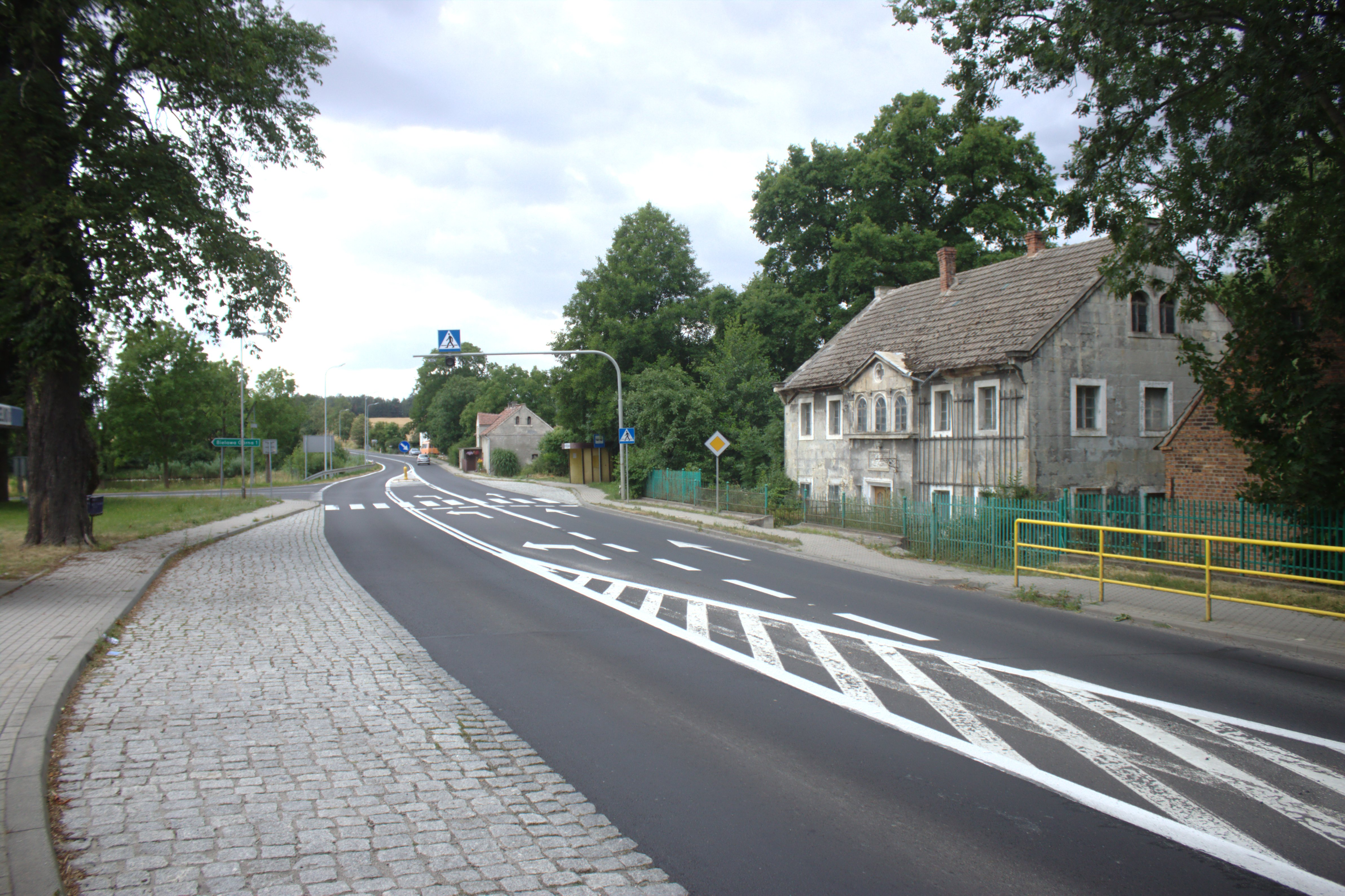
House, by the main road

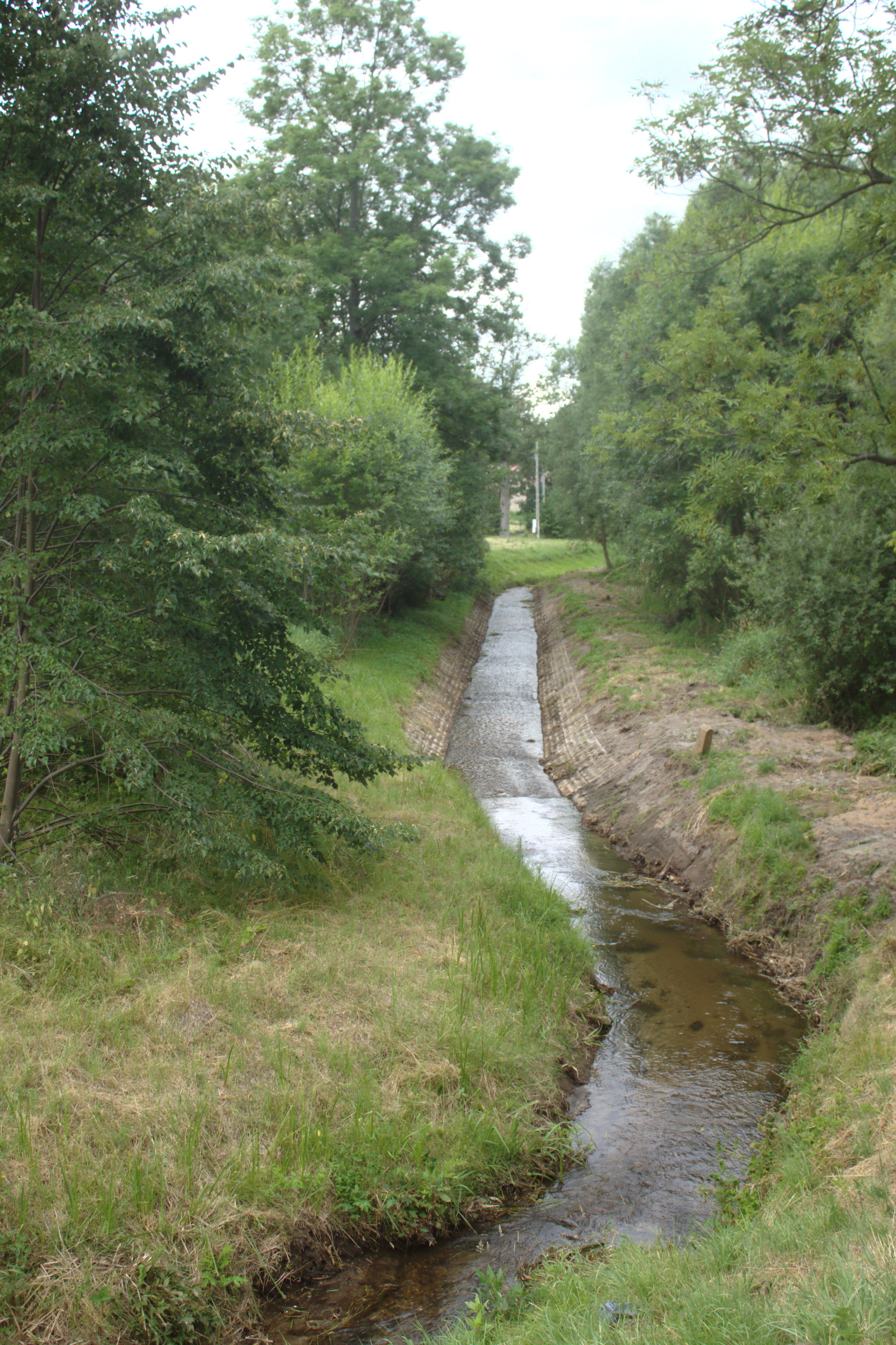
Stream
